= Drumcondra ambush =

1921 action during the Irish War of Independence

- Part of Irish War of Independence
Date	21 January 1921
Location	Drumcondra, Dublin, Ireland 53.368810°N 6.254864°W
Result	British victory

Belligerents
(Irish Republic) Irish Republican Army	(United Kingdom of Great Britain and Ireland) Royal Irish Constabulary (Auxiliary Division)

Commanders and leaders
(Irish Republic) Frank Flood (POW)	(United Kingdom of Great Britain and Ireland) William Lorraine King (F Company ADRIC) (United Kingdom of Great Britain and Ireland) Charles Thomas (I Company ADRIC)

Units involved
Dublin Brigade	F Company ADRIC; I Company ADRIC

Strength
8 volunteers	Unknown; 1 armoured car

Casualties and losses
1 killed 5 captured	None
- Location within Dublin

The Drumcondra ambush (Irish: Luíochán Dhroim Conrach) was an attempted ambush carried out by the Irish Republican Army (IRA) in Drumcondra, a suburb in northern Dublin, during the Irish War of Independence. On 21 January 1921, an IRA active service unit (ASU) initially set up an ambush near the Royal Canal in preparation for a British lorry which was travelling through the area. When the lorry failed to arrive, Frank Flood, the unit's commander, relocated his men up to a new position along the Tolka river. However, the IRA unit was spotted as they were setting up their new positions and a force of Auxiliaries was sent out, which resulted in 1 volunteer being killed and 5 others being arrested as they were attempting to escape.

Flood, Thomas Bryan, Patrick Doyle, Bernard Ryan, were sentenced to death and later hanged. The 4 men along with 6 other volunteers who met the same fate would later become known as the Forgotten Ten.

== Prelude ==
On the morning of 21 January 1921, an 8 man ASU of the IRA's Dublin Brigade commanded by Frank Flood were tasked with preparing an ambush along Drumcondra Road near Binn's Bridge. British forces were known to frequently use the road when traveling in and out of Dublin. The IRA's intention was to ambush a lorry traveling between Gormanstown and Dublin carrying Black and Tans.

The IRA men finished setting up their positions by 8:30, however, after waiting for about an hour, the lorry had failed to arrive. Around this time the roads were beginning to become more crowded, so Flood decided to abandon their current ambush position and find a new one so as to avoid civilian casualties. Flood settled on relocating the unit to a bridge over the River Tolka, 600 yards further up the Drumcondra Road from where they were.

== Discovery and capture ==
The new ambush site was at Clonturk Park, situated close to the bridge on the north side of the river. The IRA men chose to set up their positions in some allotments which had a low wall facing St Patrick's College. However, Sergeant Thomas Singleton, a police officer in the Dublin Metropolitan Police (DMP), during his beat, stumbled upon the volunteers as they were preparing their new ambush positions. Despite being pointed out to him by his unit, Flood chose not to detain Singleton as he was given orders to not "interfere in any way with the uniformed DMP". Singleton is believed to have then notified the British authorities of the IRA's presence. Upon receiving word of this, the Auxiliary Division sent detachments from F and I companies to arrest them.

After waiting at their new ambush site for around 15 minutes, the republicans decided to abort the mission has no other British lorries had come down the road. Purportedly, a unit of British soldiers was said to have been heading towards the republicans but were warned of an impeding ambush by a local resident named Robert Pike. Just as the volunteers were about to leave, they spotted a Crossley tender carrying constables from the Royal Irish Constabulary (RIC) heading towards them, at which point they reoccupied their positions. When the RIC lorry had reached the ambush site, the republicans threw a grenade and opened fire at the lorry, forcing it to immediately accelerate and drive away. After crossing the Tolka bridge, the RIC men encountered a column of auxiliaries from F company under the command of William Lorraine King, which consisted of 2 Crossley tenders and an armoured car. The police officers notified King that the IRA were in the area before they proceeded to continue on their journey.

Upon seeing King's detachment as well as another British column coming down the Drumcondra Road, the republicans immediately split up and withdrew from the scene. Volunteers Michael Magee and Seán Burke, made their escape by running through Clonturk Park, but Magee was struck by gunfire from the Auxiliaries, severely wounding him. Burke, on the other hand, managed to seek refuge in a house of an elderly man. With the help of a servant girl, Burke was able to convince a search party of Auxiliaries, who had arrived at the premises in search of him, that he was the old man's son. Mick Dunne, another volunteer, also managed to escape.

Flood, Bernard Ryan, Thomas Bryan, Dermot O'Sullivan and Patrick Doyle, began making their way to Ballybough along Richmond Road. After spotting the Auxiliary detachment from I Company heading their way, the 5 men attempted to escape by entering one of the houses and exiting through the back door. Flood tried to force the door open by shooting the lock with his revolver but failed. The Auxiliaries then pulled up at the premises and the five men were arrested.

== Aftermath ==
Magee was taken to King George V Hospital for treatment, but due to the severity of his wounds he died the following day. Before his death, he confessed that he was a part of Dublin Brigade's A company and revealed the names and addresses of four other members.

The five captured IRA men were charged with treason, with four of them receiving the death sentence. O'Sullivan's sentence was reduced to life imprisonment on account of being 17-years-old. He would spend the remainder of the war in Portland Prison before being released in August. The IRA did conceive a plan for a rescue attempt, but it never came to fruition.

Flood, Bryan, Doyle and Ryan along with volunteers Thomas Whelan and Patrick Moran were hanged at Mountjoy Prison on 14 March.
