= Bernard Ryan (Irish republican) =

Member of the IRA (c.1901-1921)

- Born: c. 1901; Dublin, Ireland
- Died: 14 March 1921 (aged 20); Mountjoy Prison, Dublin, Ireland
- Cause of death: Execution by hanging
- Occupation: Apprentice tailor
- Known for: Executed IRA volunteer : One of The Forgotten Ten

Bernard Ryan (c. 1901–1921) was one of six men hanged in Mountjoy Prison, Dublin on 14 March 1921. He was a member of the Irish Republican Army (IRA) and part of the Dublin Brigade's Active Service Unit. He was one of The Forgotten Ten.

== Background ==
He was born in the city of Dublin, the son of Joseph Ryan and Anne Ryan, née Plummer. Bernard, who was affectionately known as Bertie, was recorded with his widowed mother and his two sisters, Katie, and Sarah, in Quarry Lane, Glasnevin, Dublin in the 1911 Census of Ireland. He also had a foster brother, Paddy. He had attended St. Gabriels National School in Cowper Street. By trade he was an apprentice tailor and was 20 years old when he was hanged.

== Trial and execution ==
Ryan, together with Patrick Doyle, Thomas Bryan, and Frank Flood, were tried by Court-martial on 24 February 1921 and convicted of high treason and 'levying war against the King', following an attempted ambush at Drumcondra, Dublin on 21 January 1921. The four of them, along with Thomas Whelan and Patrick Moran, were hanged at Mountjoy Prison by executioner John Ellis on 14 March 1921, while a crowd of over 20,000 people protested outside. They were hanged in pairs: Whelan and Moran at 6am; Doyle and Ryan at 7am; and Bryan and Flood at 8am.

== Reinterment ==
He is one of a group of men hanged in Mountjoy Prison in the period 1920-1921 commonly referred to as The Forgotten Ten. In 2001 he and the other nine, including Kevin Barry, were exhumed from their graves in the prison and given a full State Funeral. He is now buried in Glasnevin Cemetery, Dublin.

== Bibliography ==
- Carey, Tim (2001). Hanged for Ireland : the forgotten ten : executed 1920-21 : a documentary history. Dublin: Blackwater Press. p. 216. ISBN 1-84131-547-8.
- Thorne, Kathleen, (2014) Echoes of Their Footsteps, The Irish Civil War 1922-1924, Generation Organization, Newberg, OR, ISBN 978-0-692-245-13-2
