= Thomas Bryan (Irish republican) =

Irish republican (1897–1921)

- Born: Thomas Brien; 9 January 1897; Dublin, Ireland
- Died: 14 March 1921 (aged 24); Mountjoy Prison, Dublin, Ireland
- Cause of death: Execution by hanging
- Occupation: Electrician
- Known for: Executed IRA volunteer : One of The Forgotten Ten

Thomas Bryan (born Thomas Brien; 9 January 1897 – 14 March 1921) was an Irish republican and member of the Irish Republican Army who was one of six men hanged in Mountjoy Prison on 14 March 1921.

== Background ==
Thomas Brien was born at 30 North Brunswick Street, Dublin on 9 January 1897. His birth was registered as Thomas, son of James Brien, a labourer, and Mary (née Caffrey) Brien. In the early 1900s, he and his family lived in North King Street, Dublin. He was an experienced IRA Volunteer and a member of the Dublin Brigade's Active Service Unit. In 1917, he took part in the hunger strike in Mountjoy in which Thomas Ashe died. By 1920, Bryan, as his surname came to be spelled for some reason, was living at 14 Henrietta Street, Dublin and was an electrician by trade.

Bryan married Annie Glynn at St. Michan's Catholic Church, Dublin on 28 November 1920. English singer Boy George is one of Bryan's great-nephews.

== Trial and execution ==
He was tried by court-martial on 24 February 1921 for his part in an attempted ambush at Drumcondra on 21 January 1921. Found guilty of high treason, he was hanged, aged 24, along with Frank Flood at 8am on 14 March 1921. Four other men had been hanged earlier on the same day: Thomas Whelan and Patrick Moran at 6am and Patrick Doyle and Bernard Ryan at 7am. It was reported that a crowd of over 20,000 people assembled outside Mountjoy on the morning of the executions. Work was also suspended throughout the city following a call from the Irish Labour Party.

== Re-interment ==
He is one of a group of men hanged in Mountjoy Prison in the period 1920–21, commonly referred to as The Forgotten Ten. On 14 October 2001, he and the other nine, including Kevin Barry, were exhumed from their graves in the prison and given a full state funeral. He is now buried in Glasnevin Cemetery, Dublin.

In March 2023, a plaque was unveiled by Dublin City Council at his old residence, 14 Henrietta Street.
