= Michael Noyk =

- Born: 12 August 1884; Telšiai, Lithuania
- Died: 22 October 1966 (aged 82); London, England
- Occupations: Politician, lawyer
- Spouse: Mabel Stein
- Children: 4

Michael Noyk (12 August 1884 – 22 October 1966) was a Lithuanian-born Irish republican politician and lawyer.

Born to a Jewish couple in the Lithuanian city of Telšiai, Noyk moved to Dublin with his family when he was one year old. He was educated at Dublin's The High School and then entered its Trinity College as a sizar in Hebrew, before winning a classics scholarship and graduating in 1907. Shortly afterwards, he worked as a solicitor. He befriended Arthur Griffith and, through him, he became highly sympathetic to the cause of Irish republicanism. He was Griffith's personal solicitor until his death. He joined Sinn Féin shortly after the Easter Rising and was responsible for defending a number of IRA prisoners including Sean MacEoin, Thomas Whelan, Patrick Moran, James Boyce, and Frank Teeling. He was a prominent worker for Éamon de Valera in the 1917 Clare East by-election, and was the election agent for Constance Markievicz and Seán T. O'Kelly in the 1918 general election. During the Irish War of Independence, he was a high-level official and adviser with the Department of Finance which was then headed by Michael Collins. Noyk also participated in Dáil Courts held in Dublin. He was responsible for the procurement of offices at 22 Mary Street in Dublin where the First Dáil's Department of Finance was located during the war.

Noyk married Mabel Stein (died 1956), the sister of artist Stella Steyn. They had four children, and lived for many years on Wellington Road in Dublin. He died in London and was given a full military funeral by the IRA's Dublin Brigade. He was buried in Dolphins Barn Jewish Cemetery.
