= List of Irish state funerals =

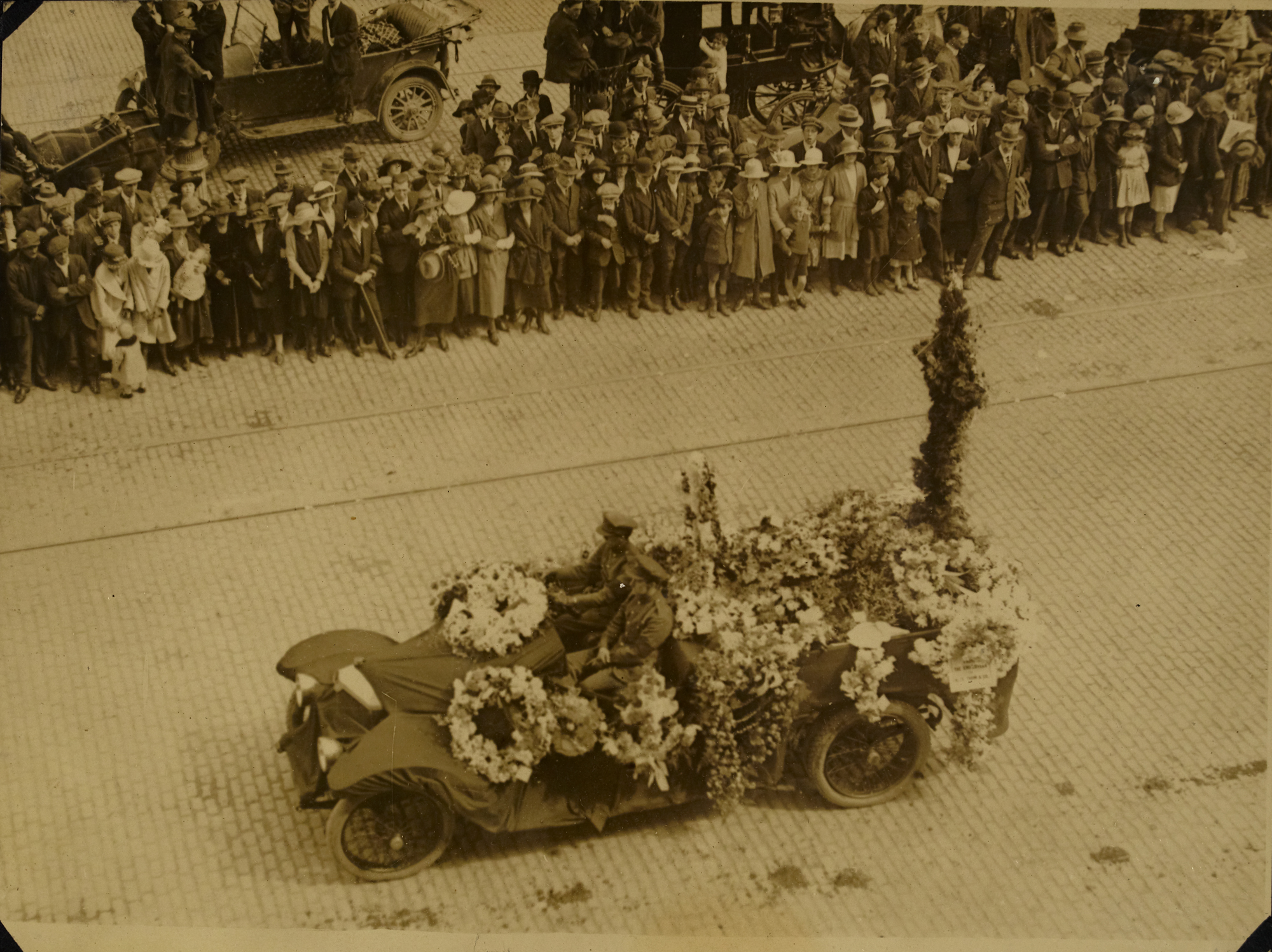
National Army soldiers drive a car laden with wreaths through the streets of Dublin towards Glasnevin Cemetery for the burial of Michael Collins (1922)

State funerals (Irish: Tórraimh stáit) in Ireland have taken place on the following occasions since 1922.

== List ==
Date	Recipient	Roles or achievements honoured (Note: Person had retired from stated role, unless stated to have died in office.)	Notes	Venue	Date of death	Refs
10 Feb 2024	John Bruton	Taoiseach		Church of SS Peter and Paul, Dunboyne, County Meath	6 Feb 2024	
21 Jun 2020	Colm Horkan	Detective Garda killed on duty	Limited funeral due to COVID-19 restrictions	St James's Church, Charlestown, County Mayo	17 Jun 2020	
15 Oct 2015	Tony Golden	Garda killed on duty (shot investigating a domestic violence incident)		Church of Saint Oliver Plunkett, Blackrock, County Louth	11 Oct 2015	
18 Sep 2015	Thomas Kent	Irish revolutionary period: executed after the Easter Rising.	Reinterment of remains located in 2014 at the site of former Cork County Gaol.	St Nicholas' Church, Castlelyons, County Cork	9 May 1916	
25 Aug 2014	Albert Reynolds	Taoiseach		Church of the Sacred Heart, Donnybrook Dublin	21 Aug 2014	
30 Jan 2013	Adrian Donohoe	Garda killed on duty (shot by robbers)		Redemptorist Church, Dundalk, County Louth	25 Jan 2013	
22 May 2011	Garret FitzGerald	Taoiseach		Church of the Sacred Heart, Donnybrook, Dublin	19 May 2011	
13 Apr 2009	Robbie McCallion	Garda killed on duty (rammed by a stolen car)		Church of Our Lady Help of Christians, Swinford, County Mayo	7 Apr 2009	
16 Apr 2008	Patrick Hillery	President of Ireland		St Mary's Pro-Cathedral, Dublin	12 Apr 2008	
16 Jun 2006	Charles Haughey	Taoiseach	Cost estimated at €530,000 including policing.	Church of Our Lady of Consolation, Donnycarney, Dublin	13 Jun 2006	
14 Oct 2001	Kevin Barry	Irish revolutionary period: volunteers executed during the War of Independence, collectively known as the Forgotten Ten.	Reinterments from Mountjoy Prison. Opposition parties complained that the funerals coincided with the ardfheis of Fianna Fáil, the main party in the government.	St Mary's Pro-Cathedral, Dublin	1 Nov 1920	
14 Oct 2001	Thomas Bryan	Irish revolutionary period: volunteers executed during the War of Independence, collectively known as the Forgotten Ten.	Reinterments from Mountjoy Prison. Opposition parties complained that the funerals coincided with the ardfheis of Fianna Fáil, the main party in the government.	St Mary's Pro-Cathedral, Dublin	14 Mar 1921	
14 Oct 2001	Patrick Doyle	Irish revolutionary period: volunteers executed during the War of Independence, collectively known as the Forgotten Ten.	Reinterments from Mountjoy Prison. Opposition parties complained that the funerals coincided with the ardfheis of Fianna Fáil, the main party in the government.	St Mary's Pro-Cathedral, Dublin	14 Mar 1921	
14 Oct 2001	Frank Flood	Irish revolutionary period: volunteers executed during the War of Independence, collectively known as the Forgotten Ten.	Reinterments from Mountjoy Prison. Opposition parties complained that the funerals coincided with the ardfheis of Fianna Fáil, the main party in the government.	St Mary's Pro-Cathedral, Dublin	14 Mar 1921	
14 Oct 2001	Patrick Moran	Irish revolutionary period: volunteers executed during the War of Independence, collectively known as the Forgotten Ten.	Reinterments from Mountjoy Prison. Opposition parties complained that the funerals coincided with the ardfheis of Fianna Fáil, the main party in the government.	St Mary's Pro-Cathedral, Dublin	14 Mar 1921	
14 Oct 2001	Bernard Ryan	Irish revolutionary period: volunteers executed during the War of Independence, collectively known as the Forgotten Ten.	Reinterments from Mountjoy Prison. Opposition parties complained that the funerals coincided with the ardfheis of Fianna Fáil, the main party in the government.	St Mary's Pro-Cathedral, Dublin	14 Mar 1921	
14 Oct 2001	Thomas Whelan	Irish revolutionary period: volunteers executed during the War of Independence, collectively known as the Forgotten Ten.	Reinterments from Mountjoy Prison. Opposition parties complained that the funerals coincided with the ardfheis of Fianna Fáil, the main party in the government.	St Mary's Pro-Cathedral, Dublin	14 Mar 1921	
14 Oct 2001	Thomas Traynor	Irish revolutionary period: volunteers executed during the War of Independence, collectively known as the Forgotten Ten.	Reinterments from Mountjoy Prison. Opposition parties complained that the funerals coincided with the ardfheis of Fianna Fáil, the main party in the government.	St Mary's Pro-Cathedral, Dublin	25 Apr 1921	
14 Oct 2001	Edmond Foley	Irish revolutionary period: volunteers executed during the War of Independence, collectively known as the Forgotten Ten.	Reinterments from Mountjoy Prison. Opposition parties complained that the funerals coincided with the ardfheis of Fianna Fáil, the main party in the government.	St Mary's Pro-Cathedral, Dublin	7 Jun 1921	
14 Oct 2001	Patrick Maher	Irish revolutionary period: volunteers executed during the War of Independence, collectively known as the Forgotten Ten.	Reinterments from Mountjoy Prison. Opposition parties complained that the funerals coincided with the ardfheis of Fianna Fáil, the main party in the government.	St Mary's Pro-Cathedral, Dublin	7 Jun 1921	
23 Oct 1999	Jack Lynch	Taoiseach	The eulogy was by Desmond O'Malley of the Progressive Democrats rather than Lynch's Fianna Fáil party	North Cathedral, Cork	20 Oct 1999	
11 Aug 1997	John Lynch	Irish Army sergeant killed in a helicopter crash on UNIFIL mission in Lebanon		Cill Mhuire Church, Ballymanny, Newbridge, County Kildare	1997	
10 Jun 1996	Jerry McCabe	Garda killed on duty escorting an An Post van ambushed at Adare, County Limerick by Provisional IRA members		Church of the Holy Rosary, Limerick	7 Jun 1996	
25 May 1995	Paul Reid	Garda killed on duty with the United Nations Protection Force in the Bosnian War. His car crashed while under sniper fire in Sarajevo.		St Eunan's Cathedral, Letterkenny, County Donegal	18 May 1995	
13 Apr 1983	Patrick Noel McLoughlin	Garda murdered at home (Note: McLoughlin was technically off duty; he was shot at the window of his home adjoining the Garda station when he heard a knock on its door outside opening hours. He was killed in revenge by men he had previously arrested.)		Church of SS Peter and Paul, Dunboyne, County Meath	11 Apr 1983 (Note: McLoughlin was shot on 9 April 1983 and died two days later.)	
23 Mar 1978	Cearbhall Ó Dálaigh	President of Ireland		St Michael's Church, Sneem, County Kerry	21 Mar 1978	
2 Sep 1975	Éamon de Valera	President of Ireland, Taoiseach and Irish revolutionary period leader	There were complaints that Fianna Fáil TDs encroached at the graveside, obstructing Fine Gael and Labour ministers and foreign dignitaries.	St Mary's Pro-Cathedral, Dublin	29 Aug 1975	
21 Nov 1974	Erskine H. Childers	President of Ireland (died in office)		St Patrick's Cathedral, Dublin	17 Nov 1974	
3 Oct 1972	Kathleen Clarke	Lord Mayor of Dublin; Irish revolutionary period: widow of Easter Rising leader Tom Clarke and member of the republican Dáil	Brendan Corish complained that as a member of the Council of State he ought to have been driven to the funeral.	St Mary's Pro-Cathedral, Dublin	29 Sep 1972	
13 May 1971	Seán Lemass	Taoiseach; Irish revolutionary period: IRA leader		Church of the Good Shepherd, Churchtown, Dublin	11 May 1971	
28 Sep 1970	James Ryan	Minister; Irish revolutionary period: IRA leader and member of the republican Dáil		County Wicklow	25 Sep 1970	
12 Mar 1968	Donogh O'Malley	Minister for Education (died in office)		St John's Cathedral, Limerick	10 Mar 1968	
10 Nov 1968	Margaret Mary Pearse	Senator (died in office); Irish revolutionary period: sister of Easter Rising leader Patrick Pearse and member of the republican Dáil		Church of the Annunciation, Rathfarnham, Dublin	7 Nov 1968	
29 Jan 1968	Alfred Chester Beatty	Culture: Founder of the Chester Beatty Library		St Patrick's Cathedral, Dublin	19 Jan 1968	
26 Nov 1966	Seán T. O'Kelly	President of Ireland		St Mary's Pro-Cathedral, Dublin	23 Nov 1966	
18 Nov 1965	W. T. Cosgrave	President of the Executive Council of the Irish Free State.	His son Liam Cosgrave insisted that the family rather than the state should pay the funeral expenses.	Church of the Annunciation, Rathfarnham, Dublin	16 Nov 1965	
1 Mar 1965	Roger Casement	Irish revolutionary period: Easter Rising leader.	Reinterment from Pentonville Prison.	St Mary's Pro-Cathedral, Dublin	3 Aug 1916	
2 Nov 1963	Domhnall Ua Buachalla	Governor-General of the Irish Free State		Church of the Sacred Heart, Donnybrook, Dublin	30 Oct 1963	
24 Jan 1963	Adolph Reifferscheidt	Diplomatic corps: West German ambassador to Ireland (died in office)		St Mary's Pro-Cathedral, Dublin	18 Jan 1963	
13 Aug 1961	John Moore	President of the Government of the Province of Connacht.	Reinterment from an untended grave in Ballygunner Temple, Waterford, rediscovered in 1960.	Church of Our Lady of the Holy Rosary, Castlebar, County Mayo	6 Dec 1799	
22 Nov 1960	Niemba ambush victims	Irish Army: Ten soldiers killed in the United Nations Operation in the Congo. Eight were killed by Luba militiamen on 8 November: Lieutenant Kevin Gleeson; Sergeant Hugh Gaynor; Corporals Peter Kelly and Liam Dougan; Privates Matthew Farrell, Michael McGuinn, and Gerard Killeen; and Trooper Thomas Fennell. The ninth, Private Patrick Davis, was shot accidentally during the recovery mission. The tenth, Trooper Anthony Browne, was at the time of the state funeral presumed to have been killed in the ambush. In November 1962 his body was located where he had been killed days after and miles from the original ambush. He received a military burial in Glasnevin.	The coffins were kept at Baldonnel Aerodrome during the funeral mass. Mourners travelled from the Pro-Cathedral to the aerodrome and then accompanied the coffins to Glasnevin Cemetery.	St Mary's Pro-Cathedral, Dublin	8 Nov 1960 (Note: Eight died on 8 November, one on 10 November, and one a few days after 8 November.)	
18 Nov 1957	Seán Moylan	Senator (died in office); Minister; Irish revolutionary period: Irish Republican Army officer		Church of St. Anthony, Clontarf, Dublin	16 Nov 1957	
27 Mar 1957	Ernie O'Malley	Irish revolutionary period: Irish Republican Army officer		Church of the Assumption, Howth, Dublin	25 Mar 1957	
14 July 1949	Douglas Hyde	President of Ireland	Irish Catholic bishops said Catholic participation in Protestant ceremonies was a reserved sin, omitting the canon law exception for minimal participation as a matter of civic courtesy. Most Catholics remained outside the Church of Ireland cathedral during the religious service, including all members of the cabinet except Noël Browne. Austin Clarke's poem "Death of an Irish President" satirises this.	St Patrick's Cathedral, Dublin	12 Jul 1949	
30 Aug 1948	Paschal Robinson	Diplomatic corps: Papal Nuncio to Ireland (died in office)	Robinson requested a simple funeral so some elements of a state funeral were omitted	St Mary's Pro-Cathedral, Dublin	27 Aug 1948	
23 Jan 1948	Sean Gantly	Garda Special Branch chief superintendent shot accidentally by a colleague during a manhunt for armed robbers		Church of the Immaculate Conception, Dublin	21 Jan 1948	
2 Dec 1944	Eoin O'Duffy	Garda Commissioner; Irish revolutionary period: Irish Republican Army chief of staff		St Mary's Pro-Cathedral, Dublin	30 Nov 1944	
29 Jan 1938	Lillie Connolly	Irish revolutionary period: Widow of Easter Rising leader James Connolly		Mount Argus Church, Harold's Cross, Dublin	22 Jan 1938	
October 1934	Patrick S. Dinneen	Culture: Gaelic revival author and lexicographer		Saint Francis Xavier Church, Gardiner Street, Dublin	29 Sep 1934	
26 April 1932	Margaret Pearse	Irish revolutionary period: mother of Easter Rising leader Patrick Pearse and member of the republican Dáil		Church of the Annunciation, Rathfarnham, Dublin	22 April 1932	
16 Jun 1929	John Devoy	Fenian Rising of 1867; Irish revolutionary period: leader in the United States	A nonpartisan committee was formed to organise his repatriation and burial in Glasnevin, but the anti-Treaty members withdrew. The coffin was draped with both the Irish and American flags.	— (Note: His funeral mass had been held after his death in the Church of the Ascension, Manhattan)	29 Sep 1928	
13 Jul 1927	Kevin O'Higgins	Vice-President of the Executive Council of the Irish Free State (assassinated in office)		St Andrew's Church, Westland Row, Dublin	10 Jul 1927	
17 Nov 1926	James Fitzsimons	Gardaí killed on duty (Fitzsimons in St Luke's, Cork and Ward in Hollyford, County Tipperary) during simultaneous IRA raids on twelve Garda stations	A joint funeral; the coffins arrived separately at Kingsbridge Station and proceeded in cortege to Glasnevin Cemetery, where the ceremonies took place, W. T. Cosgrave making an oration. Fitzsimons was buried in Glasnevin, Ward in Nobber, County Meath.	Glasnevin Cemetery, Dublin	14 Nov 1926	
17 Nov 1926	Hugh Ward	Gardaí killed on duty (Fitzsimons in St Luke's, Cork and Ward in Hollyford, County Tipperary) during simultaneous IRA raids on twelve Garda stations	A joint funeral; the coffins arrived separately at Kingsbridge Station and proceeded in cortege to Glasnevin Cemetery, where the ceremonies took place, W. T. Cosgrave making an oration. Fitzsimons was buried in Glasnevin, Ward in Nobber, County Meath.	Glasnevin Cemetery, Dublin	14 Nov 1926	
28 Aug 1922	Michael Collins	Irish revolutionary period: Chairman of the Provisional Government (killed in office in the Irish Civil War)		St Mary's Pro-Cathedral, Dublin	22 Aug 1922	
16 Aug 1922	Arthur Griffith	Irish revolutionary period: simultaneously President of the Irish Republic and member of the Provisional Government (died in office)		St Mary's Pro-Cathedral, Dublin	12 Aug 1922	

=== State funerals declined and refused ===
Former Taoisigh John A. Costello and Liam Cosgrave did not receive state funerals, at the request of their respective families. Similarly, a 1948 press release at the repatriation by LÉ Macha of the remains of W. B. Yeats, who had died in France in 1939, stated "The Government was, of course, desirous to accord full State honours in connection with the funeral, but considered it proper to respect the wishes of the poet's relatives." A state funeral was offered after the assassination of UK ambassador Christopher Ewart-Biggs in 1976; his widow agreed instead to a memorial service.

There was minimal official support for the 1970 reburial of men killed in India in the 1920 Connaught Rangers Mutiny. Arguments against a state funeral were that the 1966 Casement funeral not a precedent but rather symbolic of all who died abroad for Ireland; that the mutineers' profile was too low for major recognition; and that it might be seen as endorsing republican paramilitary action in the Troubles in Northern Ireland. While the government facilitated repatriation of the remains, the ensuing funerals were privately arranged by the National Graves Association.

== Protocol ==
Lying in state is only organised for a sitting taoiseach or president.

The church service (if Catholic) may feature a Solemn Mass, usually attended by current and past presidents, taoisigh and senior members of the Irish judiciary.

About 300 members of the Defence Forces provide a guard of honour, a gun-carriage carries the coffin, which is draped with the tricolour, and Army Buglers play the Last Post. There is a gun-salute.
