= Kevin Barry =

Irish republican (1902–1920)

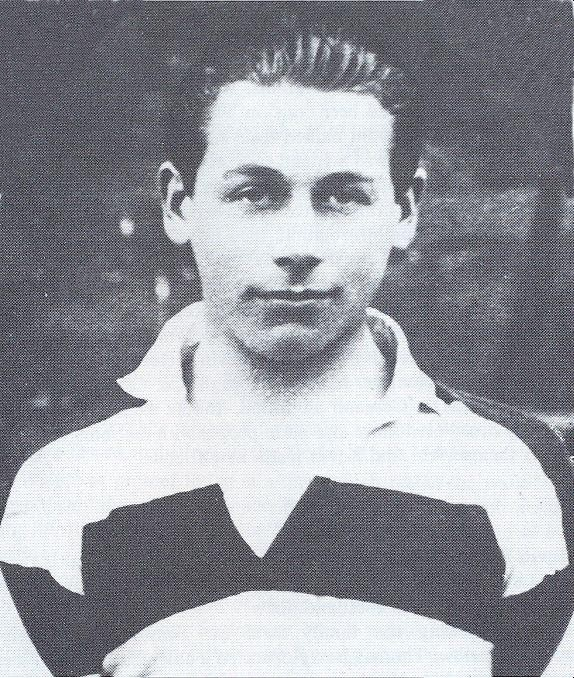
- Barry in the rugby jersey of Belvedere College, Dublin
- Born: Kevin Gerard Barry; 20 January 1902; Fleet Street, Dublin, Ireland
- Died: 1 November 1920 (aged 18); Mountjoy Jail, Dublin, Ireland
- Cause of death: Execution by hanging
- Occupation: Medical student
- Known for: Executed Irish Republican Army volunteer
- Military career
- Allegiance: Irish Republican Army (IRA)
- Branch: North Dublin
- Service years: 1917–1920
- Conflicts: Irish War of Independence

Kevin Gerard Barry (20 January 1902 – 1 November 1920) was an Irish Republican Army (IRA) soldier and medical student who was executed by the British Government during the Irish War of Independence. He was sentenced to death for his part in an attack upon a British Army supply lorry which resulted in the death of a British soldier.

His execution inflamed nationalist public opinion in Ireland, largely because of his age. The timing of the execution, only seven days after the death by hunger strike of Terence MacSwiney, the republican Lord Mayor of Cork, brought public opinion to a fever-pitch. His pending death sentence attracted international attention, and attempts were made by U.S. and Vatican officials to secure a reprieve. His execution and MacSwiney's death precipitated an escalation in violence as the Irish War of Independence entered its bloodiest phase, and Barry became an Irish republican martyr.

== Early life ==
Kevin Gerard Barry was born on 20 January 1902, at 8 Fleet Street, Dublin, to Thomas and Mary (née Dowling) Barry. The fourth of seven children, two boys and five girls, Kevin was baptised in St Andrew's Church, Westland Row. His father, Thomas Barry Sr., ran a prosperous dairy business in Dublin based at Fleet Street and supported by the output of the family's farm at Tombeagh, Hacketstown, County Carlow. Barry Sr. died of heart disease on 8 February 1908, at the age of 56, when Kevin was six years old.

Barry's mother, the former Mary Dowling, came from Drumguin, County Carlow, and, upon the death of her husband, moved the family to the farm at Tombeagh while retaining the family's townhouse on Fleet Street. As a child he went to the National School in Rathvilly. In 1915 he was sent to live in Dublin and attended the O'Connell Schools for three months, before enrolling in the Preparatory Grade at St Mary's College, Rathmines, in September 1915. He remained at that school until 31 May 1916 when it was closed by its clerical sponsors.

During this period he was undoubtedly affected by the events in April of the Easter Rising. In the same period at St. Mary's, he also attended a commemoration concert for the Manchester Martyrs, who were hanged in England in 1867. These events served to incite his nascent nationalism to the extent that he expressed his desire to join Constance Markievicz's Fianna Éireann. His family attempted to dissuade him, but one sister later expressed the belief that he joined. Barry's sister Kathleen was a committed Irish Republican and member of the women's paramilitary organisation Cumann na mBan. In 1922 she was sent to the US on a fund-raising tour. She took part in the Irish Civil War and was imprisoned by Irish Free State forces in Cork where she went on hunger strike.

== Belvedere College ==
With the closure of St Mary's College, Barry transferred to Belvedere College, a Jesuit school in Dublin. He was a substitute on the championship Junior Rugby Cup team and earned a place on the senior team. In 1918 he became secretary of the school hurling club which had just been formed, and was one of their most enthusiastic players.

In 1919, his final year at Belvedere, Barry wrote an essay supporting the Dublin Lockout as a "forcible demonstration of the power of Labour and had an experience also of the power of agitation in the person of that marvellous leader James Larkin and his able lieutenant, Commandant James Connolly". This piece earned him only sixty points out of a possible 100. Generally speaking, Barry's performance as a student was erratic. In his first and third years at Belvedere, he won no honours, although he did earn honours in five subjects in his middle year. He must have learned more than his grades reflected. After graduation, he won a merit-based scholarship given annually by Dublin Corporation, which allowed him to become a student of medicine at University College Dublin (UCD).

== Medical student ==
Barry entered UCD as a first-year medical student in October 1919 and remained a student for the next year. His closest friend at UCD was Gerry MacAleer, from Dungannon, whom he had first met in Belvedere. Another friend at UCD was Frank Flood, whom he had met at the O'Connell Schools, and was now an engineering student at the university.

Barry's medical studies competed with other attractions, including dancing, drinking, gambling, and cinema. As a result, he only managed to attend about three-quarters of his medical school lectures. Not least of his distractions was his membership in the Irish Volunteers. Barry was one of several UCD medical students involved in the Volunteers, including Tom Kissane, Liam Grimley and Mick Robinson, all of whom were involved with Barry in the Monk's Bakery ambush, along with Frank Flood. Kissane, Grimley, Robinson and Flood all survived the ambush unscathed. Flood was later captured and executed by the British in 1921.

Despite Barry's extensive involvement in Volunteer actions, he appears to have been very discreet. Although Barry was a member of the Volunteers for three of the four years of their friendship, his closest friend, Gerry McAleer, was unaware of this aspect of his life.

== Volunteer activities ==
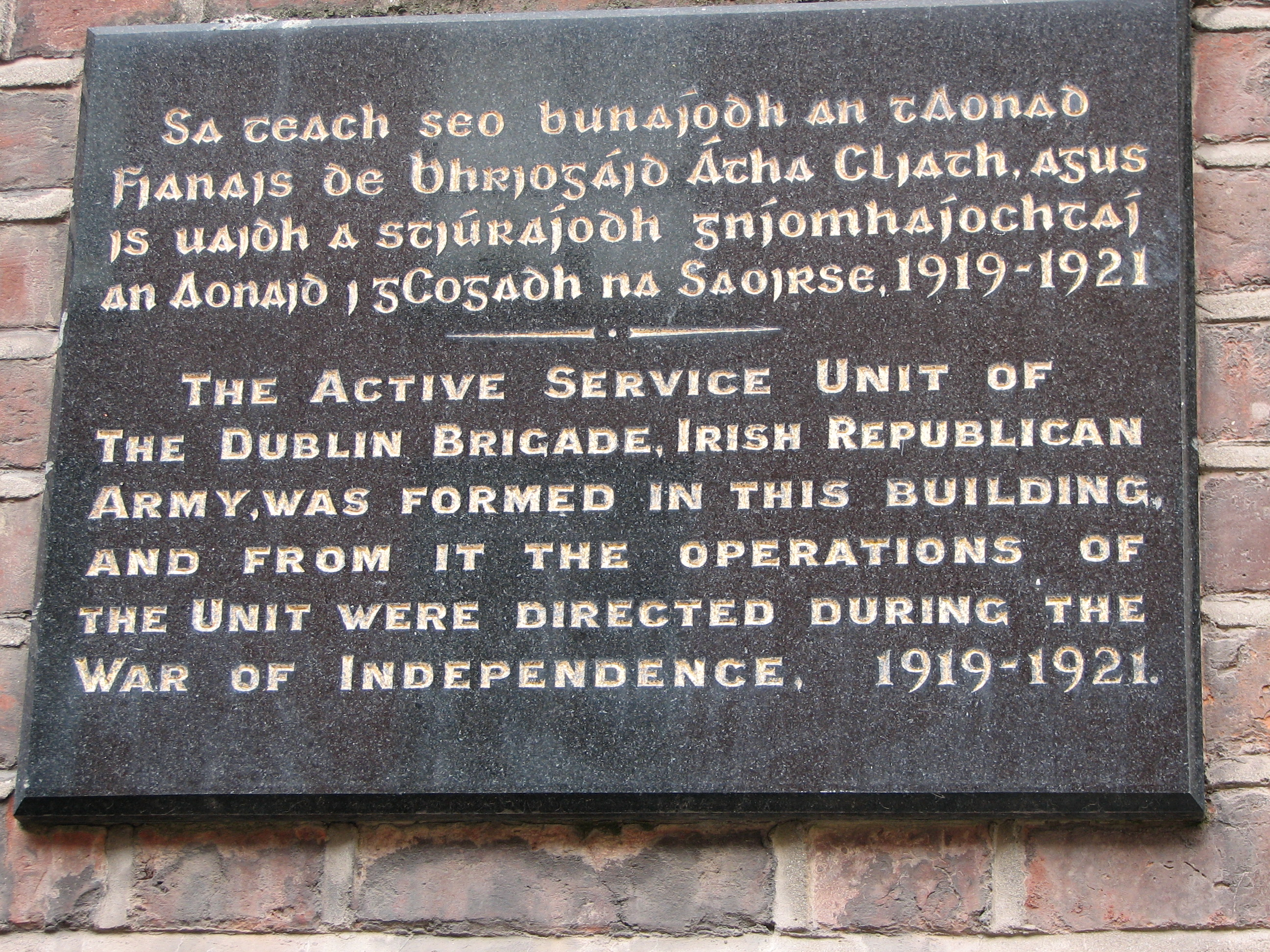
Wall plaque marking the site in 1919, where the Active Service Unit of the Dublin Brigade of the Irish Republican Army was founded. The building is in Great Denmark Street, Dublin.

In October 1917, during his second year at Belvedere, aged 15, he joined Company C, 1st Battalion of the Dublin Brigade of the Irish Volunteers. When Company C was later reorganized he was reassigned to the newly formed Company H, under the command of Captain Seamus Kavanagh. He was attached to Company C, of the 3rd Battalion of the Carlow Brigade during his vacations from school in Tombeagh.

The following year, at age 16, he was introduced by Seán O'Neill and Bob O'Flanagan to the Clarke Luby Club of the Irish Republican Brotherhood (IRB). At some point in time, he was sworn as a member of this secret society which was led by Michael Collins. Barry's activities in Dublin focused on training and operations to acquire weapons and ammunition. Training sites were regularly shifted to avoid discovery, but the extent of training that Barry received is questionable.

Although he served in the Volunteers for almost three years, his operational experience prior to the Monk's Bakery ambush was somewhat limited. For the most part, Volunteers in Dublin did little other than training and few saw action or heard shots fired in anger. He took part in a number of small operations including a raid on the Shamrock Works for weapons intended for the Royal Irish Constabulary (RIC), and a raid on Mark's of Capel Street, looking for ammunition and explosives.

Barry's one significant action prior to Monk's Bakery was the raid for weapons on a military outpost at King's Inn on Constitution Hill. The Dublin Brigade had carefully reconnoitred the site and developed an operations plan to be completed within seven minutes. On 1 June 1920, a hand-picked team from the Dublin Brigade's three battalions attacked the site taking the 25 soldiers by surprise and seizing the available weapons. Within only six minutes the raiders had secured rifles, light machine guns, and large quantities of ammunition, and had departed the site with no casualties.

== Ambush ==
In mid-September 1920, Captain Seamus Kavanagh, Commander of H Company of the Dublin Brigade, was approached by James Douglas of C Company. Douglas informed him that he and John Joe Carroll of H Company had noticed that a British army lorry guarded by an armed party of soldiers made twice weekly trips to Monk's Bakery at 79-80 Church Street to obtain bread. They had observed that the lorry came every Monday and Thursday between 11:00 and 11:15 a.m.. The party usually consisted of an officer and a driver in the cab with a non-commissioned officer and eight privates in the rear. The officer and one soldier would enter the bakery to purchase bread. Four or five soldiers would stay with the lorry without taking any particular security measures while the others would cross the street to purchase cigarettes or sweets. Within ten to fifteen minutes the bread would be loaded and the lorry would depart.

On 13 September, Captain Kavanagh went to Church Street to confirm the information and reconnoitre the area. He observed the lorry arrive and confirmed the particulars Douglas had related. After the soldiers departed he went into the bakery and talked with J.J. Moore, the foreman carpenter, whom Kavanagh knew and who was sympathetic to the Volunteers. Moore also validated the conclusions of Douglas and Carroll and stated that the party did not exceed 11 men. Moore then showed Kavanagh around the bakery so that the latter could develop a plan for an ambush including planned dispositions of his men. He was also shown a passage from the bakery yard leading into a shop in North King Street which would provide a useful line of retreat for any men posted in the yard.

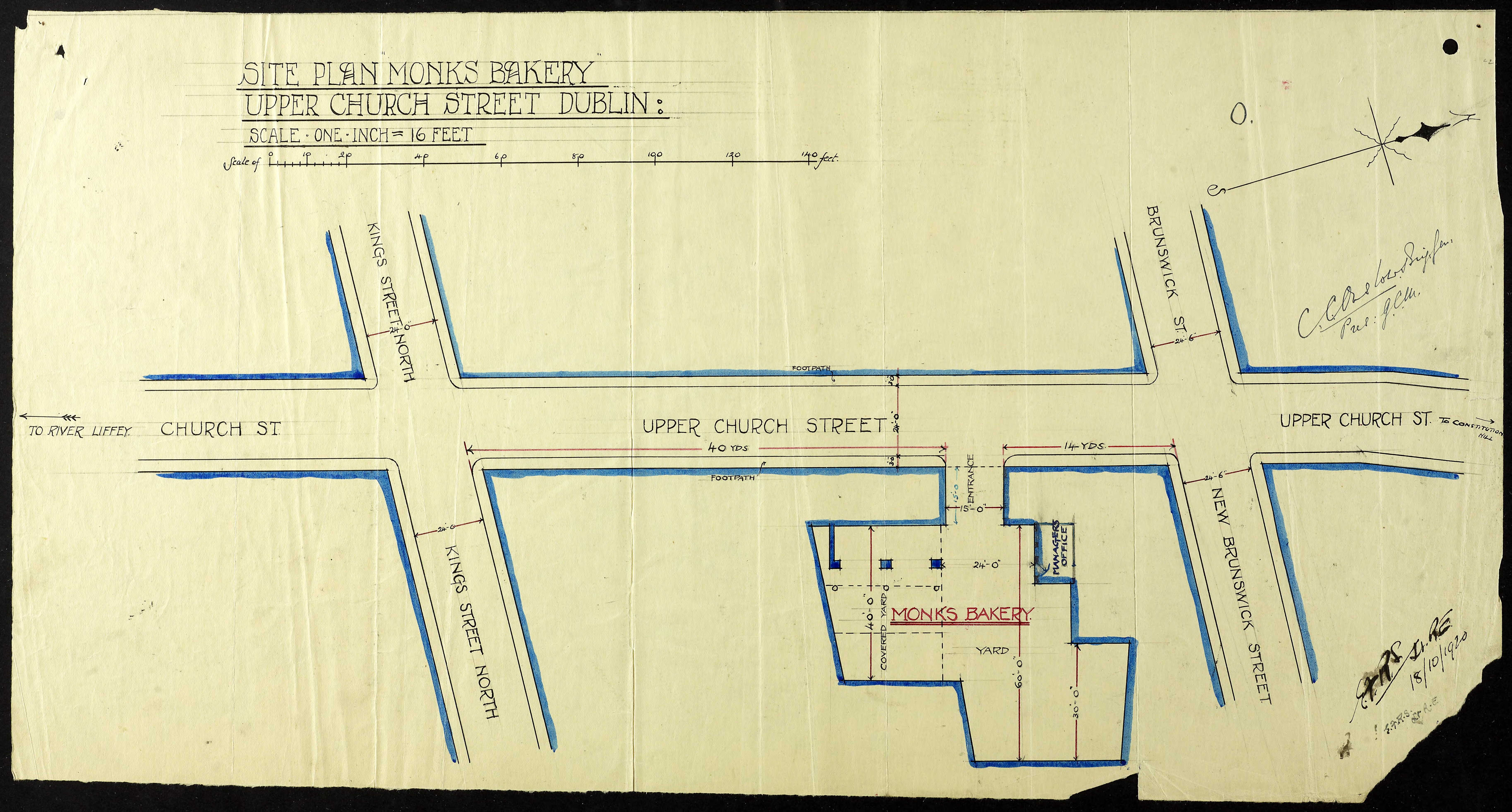
Court-martial trial exhibit depicting Monk's bakery ambush site

After obtaining permission to conduct the ambush, Captain Kavanagh selected men from his company to participate and developed his detailed plan. At this time, Barry was a member of Company C, but upon returning to Dublin from vacation he learned of the operation and asked Captain Kavanagh if he could participate as he had done in another Company H operation in June at King's Inn. With the addition of Barry, the operational party was to consist of Kavanagh in command, with two Lieutenants, seven Section Commanders, an Assistant Quartermaster, four Squad Leaders (one of which was Barry), and ten Volunteers. Additionally, a van was to report to the vicinity of the bakery to collect any captured weapons.

On Sunday night, 19 September, Kavanagh assembled his men and told them to report to the O'Flanagan Sinn Féin Club at 9:00 a.m. the following morning. He directed that no one was to carry anything that could be used to identify him in the event of capture. He then met privately with Barry and asked if he had an examination at UCD the next day. Barry responded, "Oh, that will be all right". Kavanagh said that he didn't want him to miss another as he had missed one on the day of the King's Inn raid, to which Barry responded, "How do you think I could sit for an examination, knowing this job is on and me not on it?" Kavanagh finally agreed, and noted later that, "I can never forget the look of delight on Kevin's face when I told him he could come on the job".

On the morning of 20 September 1920, Barry went to Mass, then joined a party of IRA volunteers on Bolton Street in Dublin. Their orders were to ambush a British army lorry as it picked up a delivery of bread from the bakery and capture their weapons. The ambush was scheduled for 11:00 am, which gave him enough time to take part in the operation and return to class in time for an examination he had at 2:00 pm. The truck arrived late, and was under the command of Sergeant Banks.

Barry and members of C Company were to surround the lorry, disarm the soldiers, take the weapons and escape. He covered the back of the vehicle and, when challenged, the five soldiers complied with the order to lay down their weapons. A shot was then fired; Terry Golway, author of For the Cause of Liberty, suggests it was possibly a warning shot from an uncovered soldier in the front. Barry and the rest of the ambush party then opened fire. His gun jammed twice and he dived for cover under the vehicle. His comrades fled and he was left behind. He was then spotted and arrested by the soldiers. One of the soldiers, Private Harold Washington, had been shot dead. Two others, Privates Marshall Whitehead and Thomas Humphries, were both badly wounded and later died of their wounds.

The British Army released the following statement on Monday afternoon:

This morning a party of one N.C.O. and six men of the Duke of Wellington's Regiment were fired on by a body of civilians outside a bakery in Church Street, Dublin. One soldier was killed and four were wounded. A piquet of the Lancashire Fusiliers in the vicinity, hearing the shots, hurried to their comrades' assistance, and succeeded in arresting one of the aggressors. No arms or equipment were lost by the soldiers.

Much was made of Barry's age by Irish newspapers, but the British military pointed out that the three soldiers who had been killed were "much the same age as Barry". On 20 October, Major Reginald Ingram Marians OBE, Head of the Press Section of the General Staff, informed Basil Clarke, Head of Publicity, that Washington was "only 19 and that the other soldiers were of similar ages." General Macready was well aware of the "propaganda value of the soldier's ages." Macready informed General Sir Henry Wilson on the day that sentence was pronounced "of the three men who were killed by him (Barry) and his friends two were 19 and one 20 — official age so probably they were younger... so if you want propaganda there you are."

About this competing propaganda, Martin Doherty wrote in a magazine article entitled 'Kevin Barry & the Anglo-Irish Propaganda War':

from the British point of view, therefore, the Anglo-Irish propaganda war was probably unwinable [sic]. Nationalist Ireland had decided that men like Kevin Barry fought to free their country, while British soldiers — young or not — sought to withhold that freedom. In these circumstances, to label Barry a murderer was merely to add insult to injury. The contrasting failure of British propaganda is graphically demonstrated by the simple fact that even in British newspapers Privates Whitehead, Washington and Humphries remained faceless names and numbers, for whom no songs were written.”

== Capture and allegations of torture ==
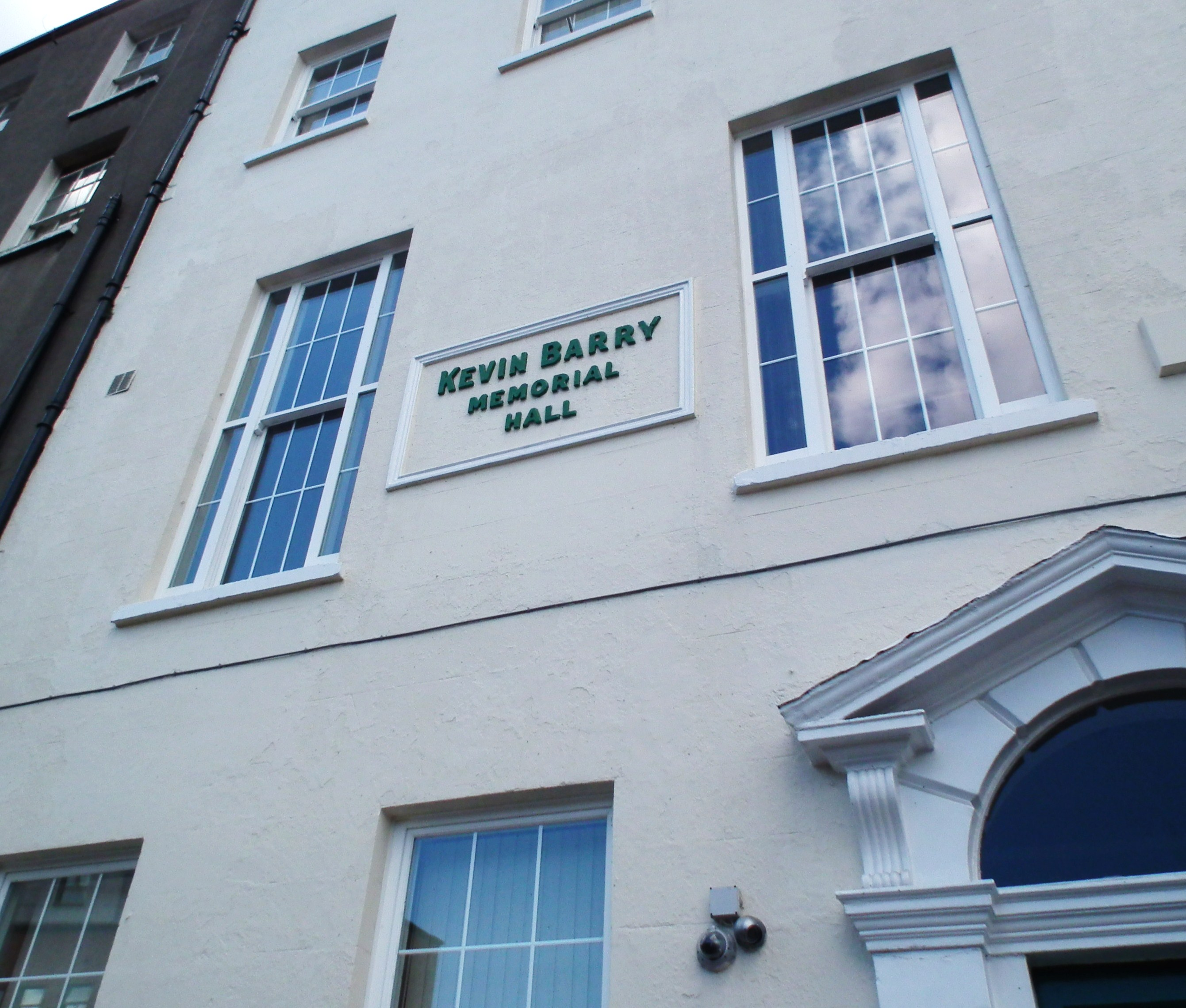
Sinn Féin's Dublin HQ at the Kevin Barry Memorial Hall

Barry was placed in the back of the lorry with the young body of Private Harold Washington, and also with Washington's comrades. He was transported then to the North Dublin Union. Upon arrival at the barracks, he was taken under military police escort to the defaulters' room where he was searched and handcuffed. A short while later, three sergeants of the Lancashire Fusiliers and two officers began the interrogation. He gave his name and an address of 58 South Circular Road, Dublin (his uncle's address), and his occupation as a medical student, but refused to answer any other questions. The officers continued to demand the names of other republicans involved in the ambush.

At this time a publicity campaign was mounted by Sinn Féin. Barry received orders on 28 October from his brigade commander, Richard McKee, "to make a sworn affidavit concerning his torture in the North Dublin Union." Arrangements were made to deliver this through Barry's sister, Kathy, to Desmond Fitzgerald, director of publicity for Sinn Féin, "with the object of having it published in the World press, and particularly in the English papers, on Saturday 30th October."

The affidavit, drawn up in Mountjoy Prison days before his execution, describes his treatment when the question of names was repeated:

He tried to persuade me to give the names, and I persisted in refusing. He then sent the sergeant out of the room for a bayonet. When it was brought in the sergeant was ordered by the same officer to point the bayonet at my stomach ... The sergeant then said that he would run the bayonet into me if I did not tell ... The same officer then said to me that if I persisted in my attitude he would turn me out to the men in the barrack square, and he supposed I knew what that meant with the men in their present temper. I said nothing. He ordered the sergeants to put me face down on the floor and twist my arm ... When I lay on the floor, one of the sergeants knelt on my back, the other two placed one foot each on my back and left shoulder, and the man who knelt on me twisted my right arm, holding it by the wrist with one hand, while he held my hair with the other to pull back my head. The arm was twisted from the elbow joint. This continued, to the best of my judgment, for five minutes. It was very painful ... I still persisted in refusing to answer these questions... A civilian came in and repeated the questions, with the same result. He informed me that if I gave all the information I knew I could get off.

On 28 October, the Irish Bulletin, the official propaganda news-sheet produced by Dáil Éireann's Department of Publicity, published Barry's statement alleging torture. The headline read: English Military Government Torture a Prisoner of War and are about to Hang him. The Irish Bulletin declared Barry to be a prisoner of war, suggesting a conflict of principles was at the heart of the conflict. The English did not recognise a war and treated all killings by the IRA as murder.

Historian John Ainsworth, author of Kevin Barry, the Incident at Monk's bakery and the Making of an Irish Republican Legend, pointed out that Barry had been captured by the British not as a uniformed soldier but disguised as a civilian and in possession of flat-nosed "Dum-dum" bullets, which expand upon impact, maximising the amount of damage done to the "unfortunate individual" targeted, in contravention of the Hague Convention of 1899.

Erskine Childers addressed the question of political status in a letter to the press on 29 October, which was published the day after Barry's execution.

This lad Barry was doing precisely what Englishmen would be doing under the same circumstances and with the same bitter and intolerable provocation — the suppression by military force of their country's liberty.
To hang him for murder is an insulting outrage, and it is more: it is an abuse of power: an unworthy act of vengeance. contrasting ill with the forbearance and humanity invariably shown by the Irish Volunteers towards the prisoners captured by them when they have been successful in encounters similar to this one. These guerrilla combats with soldiers and constables — both classes do the same work with the same weapons; the work of military repression — are typical episodes in Ireland.
Murder of individual constables, miscalled ‘police’, have been comparatively rare. The Government figure is 38, and it will not, to my knowledge, bear examination. I charge against the British Government 80 murders by soldiers and constables: murders of unarmed people, and for the most part wholly innocent people, including old men, women and boys.
To hang Barry is to push to its logical extreme the hypocritical pretence that the national movement in Ireland unflinchingly supported by the great mass of the Irish people, is the squalid conspiracy of a ‘murder gang’.
That is false; it is a natural uprising: a collision between two Governments, one resting on consent, the other on force. The Irish are struggling against overwhelming odds to defend their own elected institutions against extinction.

In a letter addressed to "the civilised nations of the world", Arthur Griffith — then acting President of the Republic wrote:

Under similar circumstances a body of Irish Volunteers captured on June 1 of the present year a party of 25 English military who were on duty at the King's Inns, Dublin. Having disarmed the party the Volunteers immediately released their prisoners. This was in strict accordance with the conduct of the Volunteers in all such encounters. Hundreds of members of the armed forces have been from time to time captured by the Volunteers and in no case was any prisoner maltreated even though Volunteers had been killed and wounded in the fighting, as in the case of Cloyne, County Cork, when, after a conflict in which one Volunteer was killed and two wounded, the whole of the opposing forces were captured, disarmed, and set at liberty.

Ainsworth notes that "Griffith was deliberately using examples relating to IRA engagements with British military forces rather than the police, for he knew that engagements involving the police, in particular, were usually of an uncivilized nature, characterized by violence and brutality, albeit on both sides by this stage."

== Trial ==
The War Office ordered that Kevin Barry be tried by court-martial under the Restoration of Order in Ireland Act, which received Royal Assent on 9 August 1920. General Sir Nevil Macready, Commander-in-Chief of British forces in Ireland then nominated a court of nine officers under Brigadier-General Onslow.

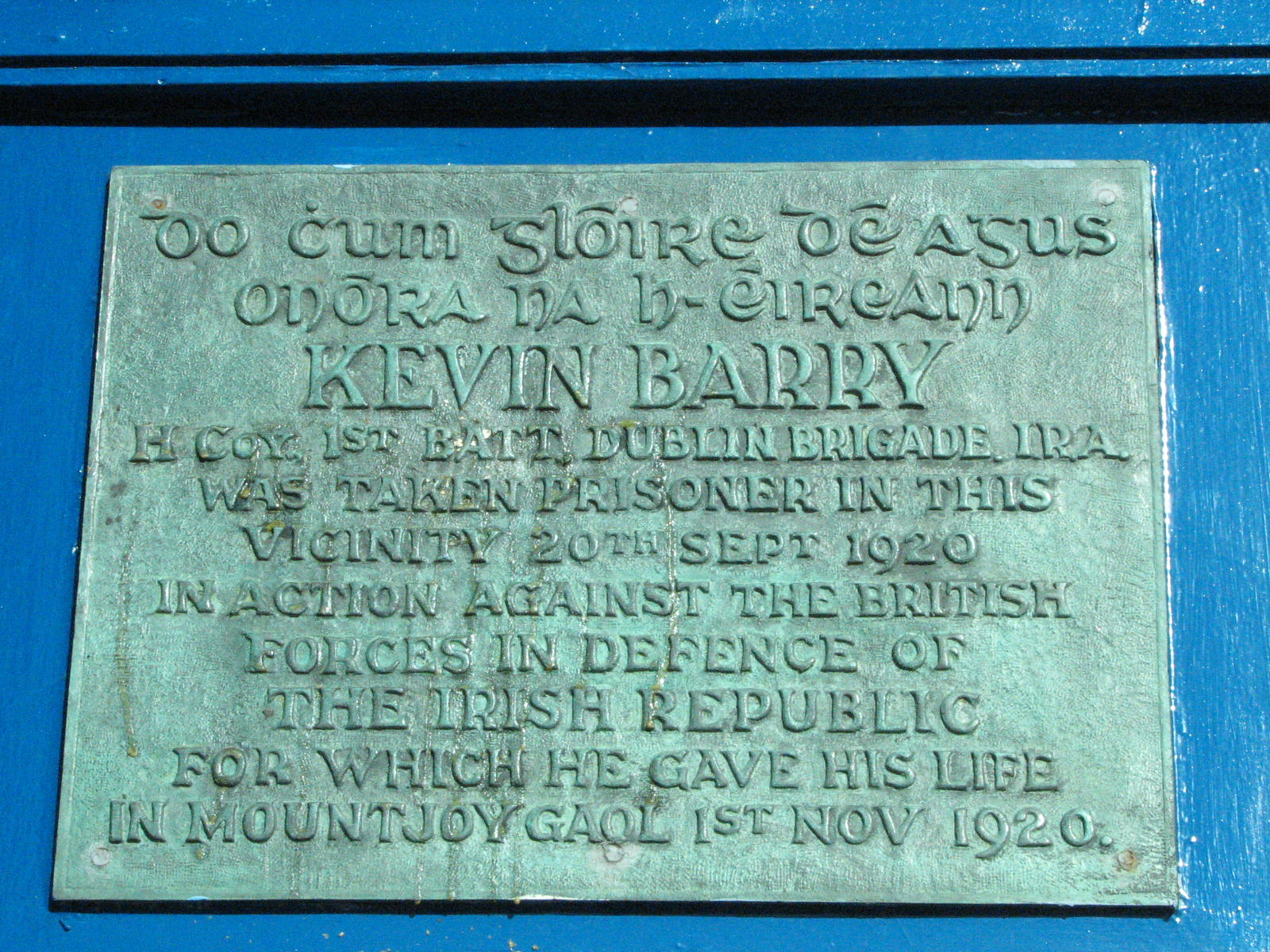
Kevin Barry commemorative plaque close to the spot where he was captured on Church Street, Dublin

On 20 October, at 10 o'clock, the nine officers of the court — ranging in rank from Brigadier to Lieutenant — took their places at an elevated table. At 10.25, Kevin Barry was brought into the room by a military escort. Then Seán Ó hUadhaigh sought a short adjournment to consult his client. The court granted this request. After the short adjournment Barry announced, "As a soldier of the Irish Republic, I refuse to recognise the court". Brigadier Onslow explained the prisoner's "perilous situation" and that he was being tried on a capital charge. He did not reply. Ó hUadhaigh then rose to tell the court that since his client did not recognise the authority of the court he himself could take no further part in the proceedings.

Barry was charged with three counts of the murder of Private Marshall Whitehead. One of the bullets taken from Whitehead's body was of .45 calibre, while all witnesses stated that Barry was armed with a .38 Mauser Parabellum. The Judge Advocate General informed the court that the Crown had only to prove that the accused was one of the party that killed three British soldiers, and every member of the party was technically guilty of murder. In accordance with military procedure, the verdict was not announced in court. He was returned to Mountjoy, and at about 8 o’clock that night, the district court-martial officer entered his cell and read out the sentence: death by hanging. The public learned on 28 October that the date of execution had been fixed for 1 November.

== Execution ==
Barry spent the last day of his life preparing for death. His ordeal focused world attention on Ireland. According to Sean Cronin, author of a biography of Barry (Kevin Barry), he hoped for a firing squad rather than the gallows, as he had been condemned by a military court. A friend who visited him in Mountjoy prison after he received confirmation of the death sentence, said:

He is meeting death as he met life with courage but with nothing of the braggart. He does not believe that he is doing anything wonderfully heroic. Again and again, he has begged that no fuss be made about him.

He reported Barry as saying "It is nothing, to give one's life for Ireland. I'm not the first and maybe I won't be the last. What's my life compared with the cause?" Barry joked about his death with his sister Kathy. "Well, they are not going to let me like a soldier fall… But I must say they are going to hang me like a gentleman." This was, according to Cronin, a reference to George Bernard Shaw's play The Devil's Disciple.

On 31 October, he was allowed three visits of three people each, the last of which was taken by his mother, brother and sisters. In addition to the two Auxiliaries with him, there were five or six warders in the boardroom. As his family were leaving, they met Canon John Waters, on the way in, who said, "This boy does not seem to realise he is going to die in the morning." Mrs Barry asked him what he meant. He said: "He is so gay and light-hearted all the time. If he fully realised it, he would be overwhelmed." Mrs Barry replied, "Canon Waters, I know you are not a Republican. But is it impossible for you to understand that my son is actually proud to die for the Republic?" Canon Waters became somewhat flustered as they parted. The Barry family recorded that they were upset by this encounter because they considered the chief chaplain "the nearest thing to a friend that Kevin would see before his death, and he seemed so alien."

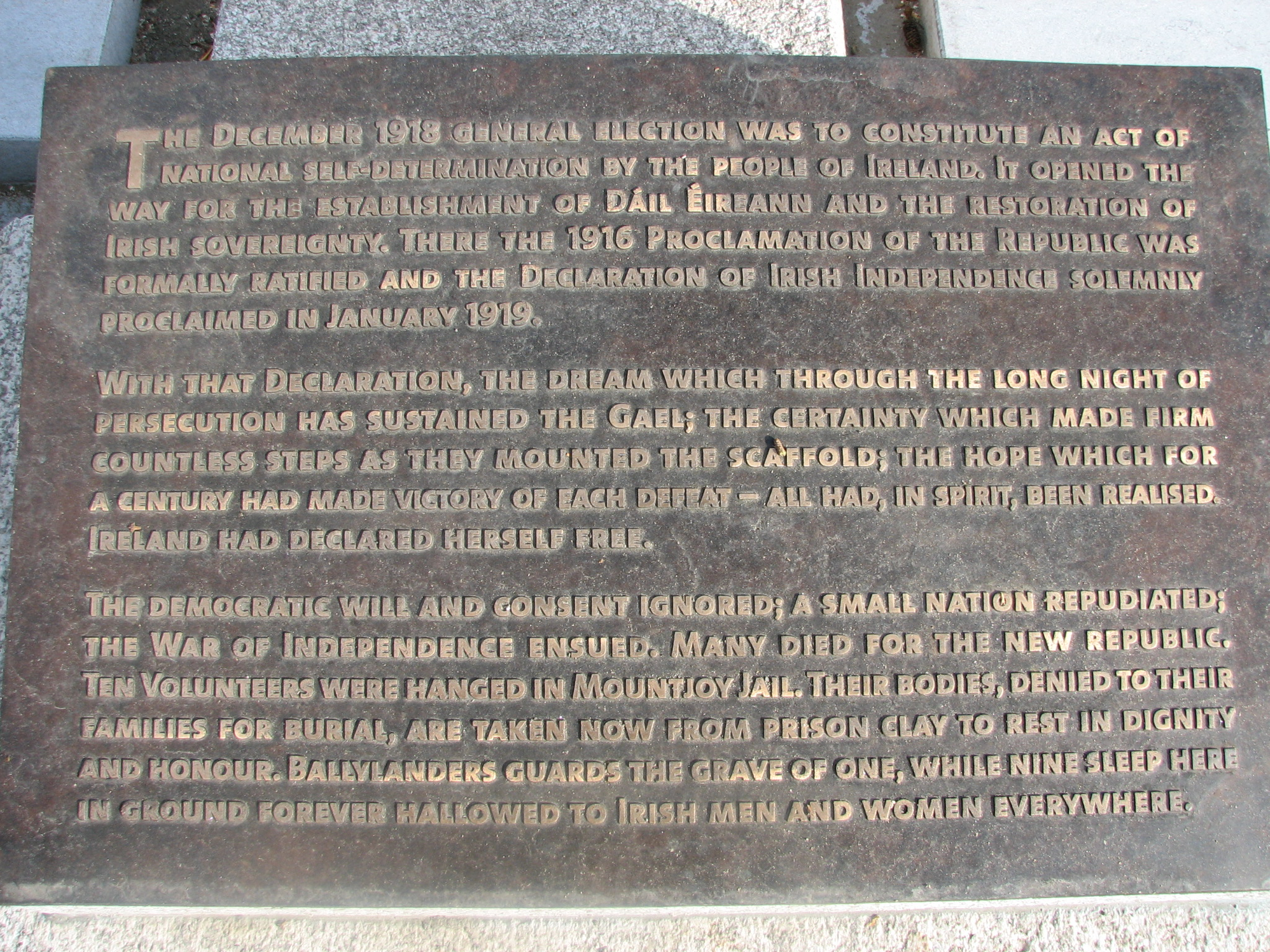
Plaque placed by the Irish Government on the graves of the Volunteers

Barry was hanged on 1 November, after hearing two Masses in his cell. Canon Waters, who walked with him to the scaffold, wrote to Barry's mother later, "You are the mother, my dear Mrs Barry, of one of the bravest and best boys I have ever known. His death was one of the most holy, and your dear boy is waiting for you now, beyond the reach of sorrow or trial."

Dublin Corporation met on the Monday, passed a vote of sympathy with the Barry family, and adjourned the meeting as a mark of respect. The Chief Secretary's office in Dublin Castle, on the Monday night, released the following communiqué:

The sentence of death by hanging passed by court-martial upon Kevin Barry, or Berry, medical student, aged 18½ years, for the murder of Private Whitehead in Dublin on September 20, was duly executed this morning at Mountjoy Prison, Dublin.
At a military court of inquiry, held subsequently in lieu of an inquest, medical evidence was given to the effect that death was instantaneous. The court found that the sentence had been carried out in accordance with law.

Barry's body was buried at 1.30 pm, in a plot near the women's prison. His comrade and fellow student Frank Flood was buried alongside him four months later. A plain cross marked their graves and those of Patrick Moran, Thomas Whelan, Thomas Traynor, Patrick Doyle, Thomas Bryan, Bernard Ryan, Edmond Foley and Patrick Maher who were hanged in the same prison before the Anglo-Irish Treaty of July 1921 which ended hostilities between Irish republicans and the British. The men had been buried in unconsecrated ground on the jail property and their graves went unidentified until 1934. They became known as The Forgotten Ten by republicans campaigning for the bodies to be reburied with honour and proper rites. On 14 October 2001, the remains of these ten men were given a state funeral and moved from Mountjoy Prison to be re-interred at Glasnevin Cemetery in Dublin.

== Aftermath ==
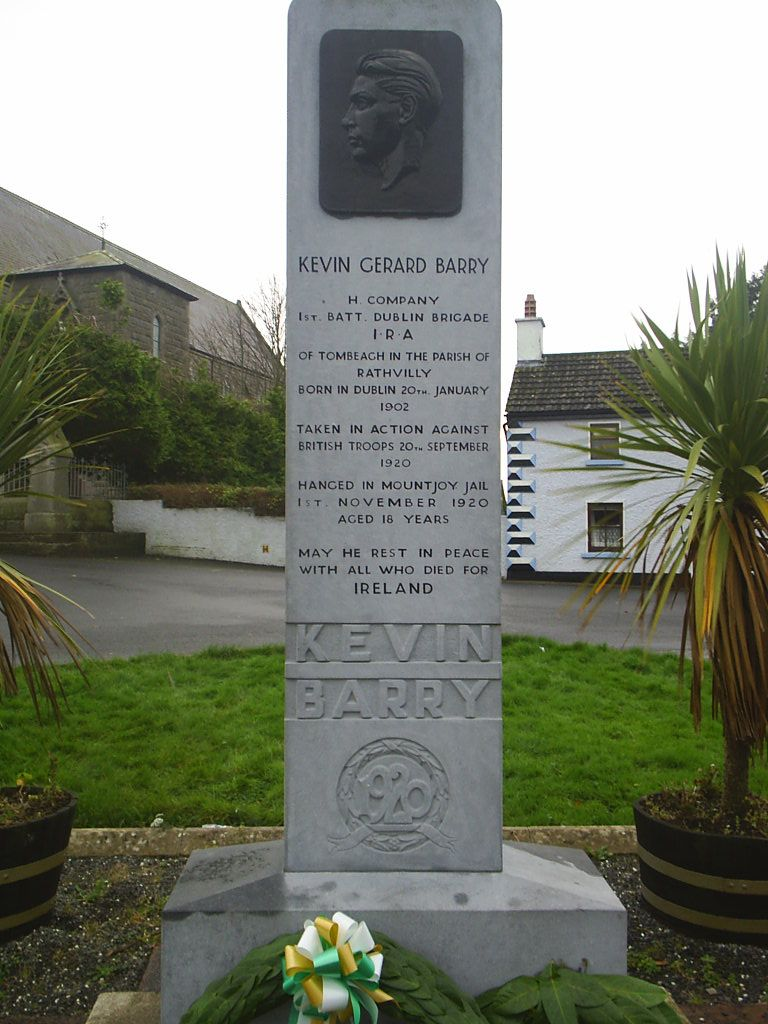
Kevin Barry monument in Rathvilly, County Carlow

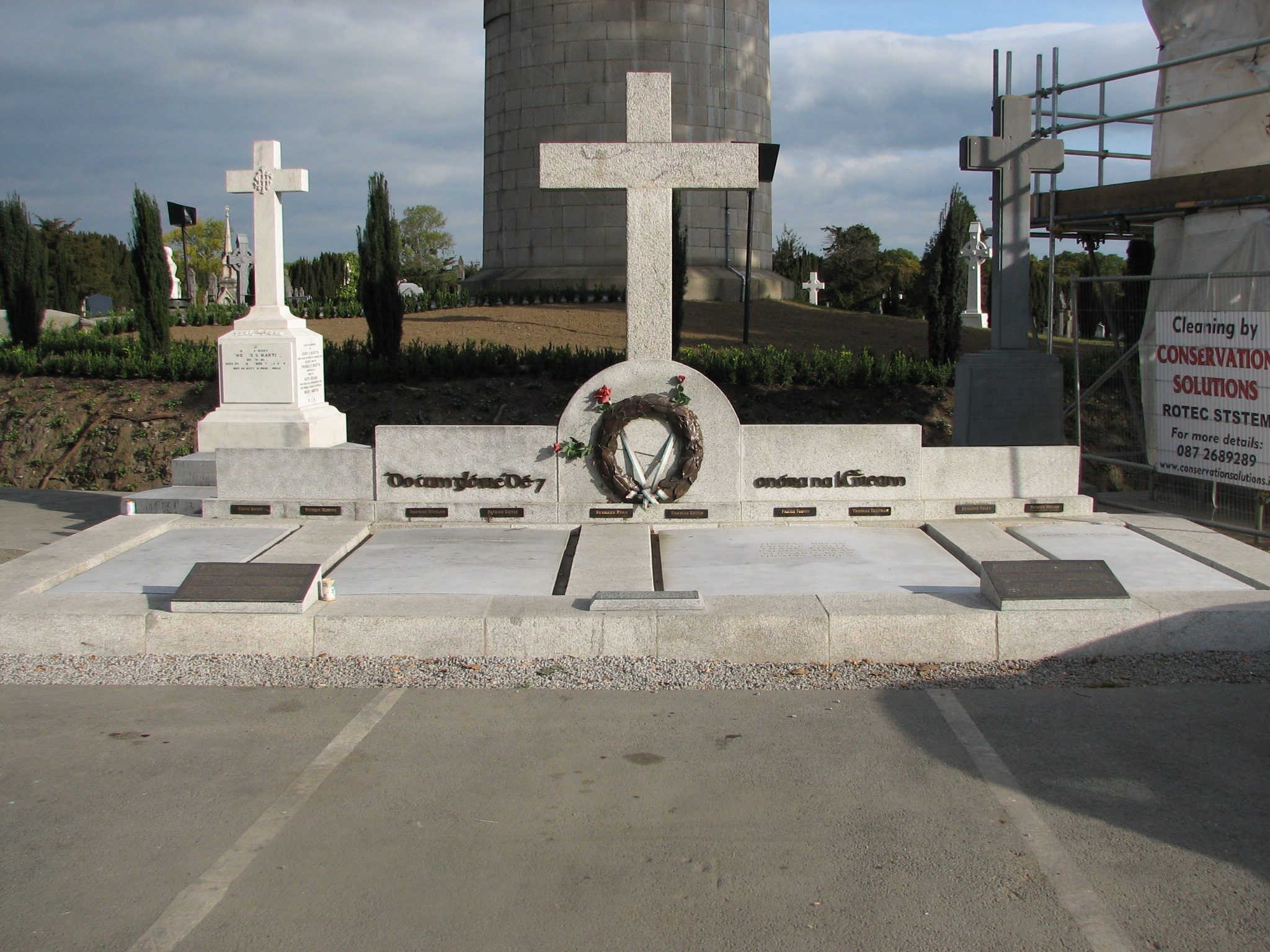
On 14 October 2001 the remains of Kevin Barry and nine other volunteers from the War of Independence were given a state funeral and moved from Mountjoy Prison to be re-interred at Glasnevin Cemetery in Dublin. Barry's grave is the first on the left.

The only full-length biography of Barry was written by his nephew, journalist Donal O'Donovan, and published in 1989 as Kevin Barry and his Time. In 1965, Sean Cronin wrote a short biography, simply entitled "Kevin Barry"; this was published by The National Publications Committee, Cork, to which Tom Barry provided a foreword. Barry is remembered in a well-known song about his imprisonment and execution, written shortly after his death and still sung today. The tune to "Kevin Barry" was taken from the sea-shanty "Rolling Home". The execution reportedly inspired Thomas MacGreevy's surrealist poem, "Homage to Hieronymus Bosch". MacGreevy had unsuccessfully petitioned the Provost of Trinity College Dublin, John Henry Bernard, to make representations on Barry's behalf.

== Legacy ==
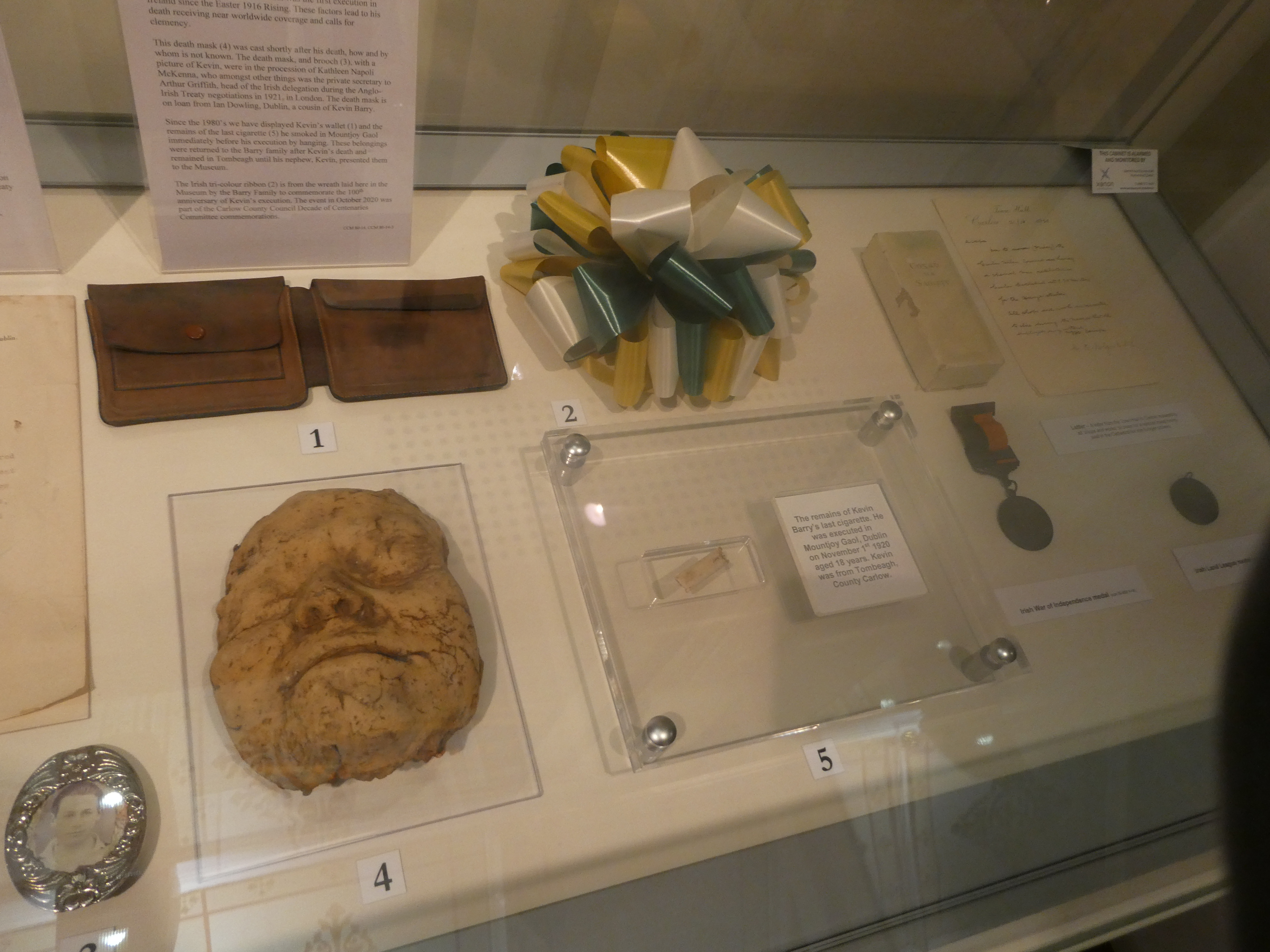
Exhibit of personal effects and death mask in Carlow County Museum

In 1930, Irish immigrants in Hartford, Connecticut, created a hurling club and named it after Barry. The club later disappeared for decades but was revived in 2011 by more recently arrived Irish immigrants and local Irish-Americans in the area. A commemorative stamp was issued by the Department of Posts and Telegraphs to mark the 50th anniversary of Barry's death in 1970. The University College Dublin and University of Galway branches of Ógra Fianna Fáil are named after him. Derrylaughan Kevin Barry's GAA club was founded in Clonoe, County Tyrone.

In 1934, a large stained-glass window commemorating Barry was unveiled in Earlsfort Terrace, then the principal campus of University College Dublin. It was designed by Richard King of the Harry Clarke Studio. In 2007, UCD completed its relocation to the Belfield campus some four miles away and a fund was collected by graduates to defray the cost (estimated at close to €250,000) of restoring and moving the window to this new location. A grandnephew of Kevin Barry is Irish historian Eunan O'Halpin. There is an Irish republican flute band named after him in Glasgow, the "Volunteer Kevin Barry Republican Flute Band".

Barry's execution is mentioned in the folk song "Rifles of the I.R.A.", which was written by Dominic Behan in 1968. The ballad "Kevin Barry", relating the story of his execution, has been sung by artists such as Paul Robeson, Leonard Cohen, Lonnie Donegan, Stompin' Tom Connors, the Hootenanny Singers, Damien Dempsey, The Clancy Brothers, Kinky Friedman, Tommy Makem and The Dubliners. At the place where Kevin Barry was captured (North King Street/Church Street, Dublin), there are two blocks of social housing named after him.
