= Forgotten Ten =

Members of the Irish Republican Army

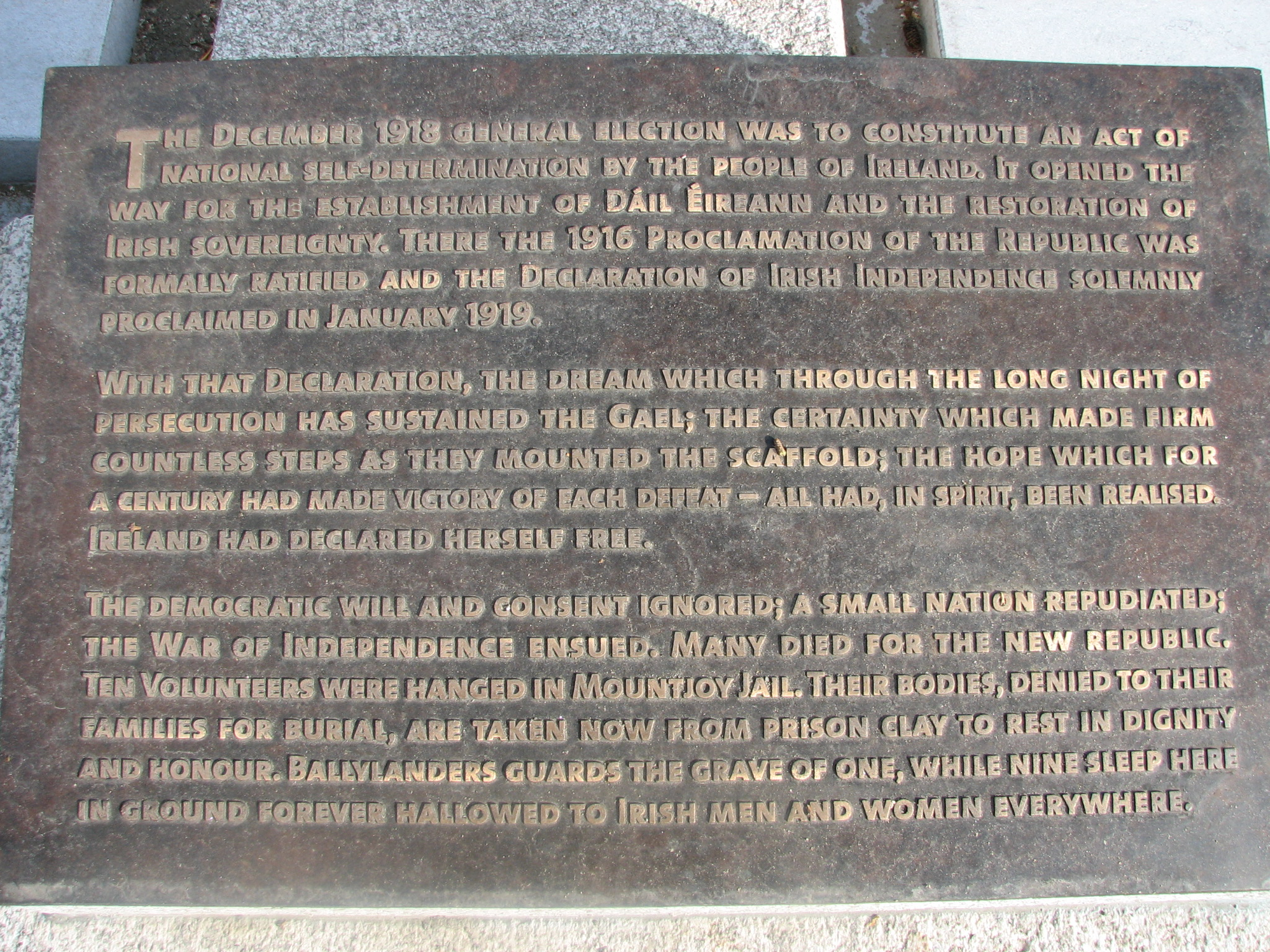
Plaque placed by the Irish Government on the graves of the Volunteers

The Forgotten Ten (Irish: An Deichniúr Dearmadta) were ten members of the Irish Republican Army who were executed in Mountjoy Prison, Dublin, by British forces following courts martial from 1920 to 1921 during the Irish War of Independence.

Under military law at the time, they were buried within the prison precincts, their graves unmarked in the unconsecrated ground. The names of the Forgotten Ten are Kevin Barry, Thomas Whelan, Patrick Moran, Patrick Doyle, Bernard Ryan, Thomas Bryan, Frank Flood, Thomas Traynor, Edmond Foley, and Patrick Maher. The hangman was John Ellis.

== Campaign for reburial ==
Following the Irish War of Independence, Mountjoy Prison was transferred to the control of the Irish Free State, which became the State of Ireland in 1937. In the 1920s, the families of the dead men requested their remains be returned to them for proper burial. This effort was joined in the later 1920s by the National Graves Association. Through the efforts of the Association, the graves of the men were identified in 1934, and in 1996 a Celtic cross was erected in Glasnevin Cemetery to commemorate them.

== State funeral ==
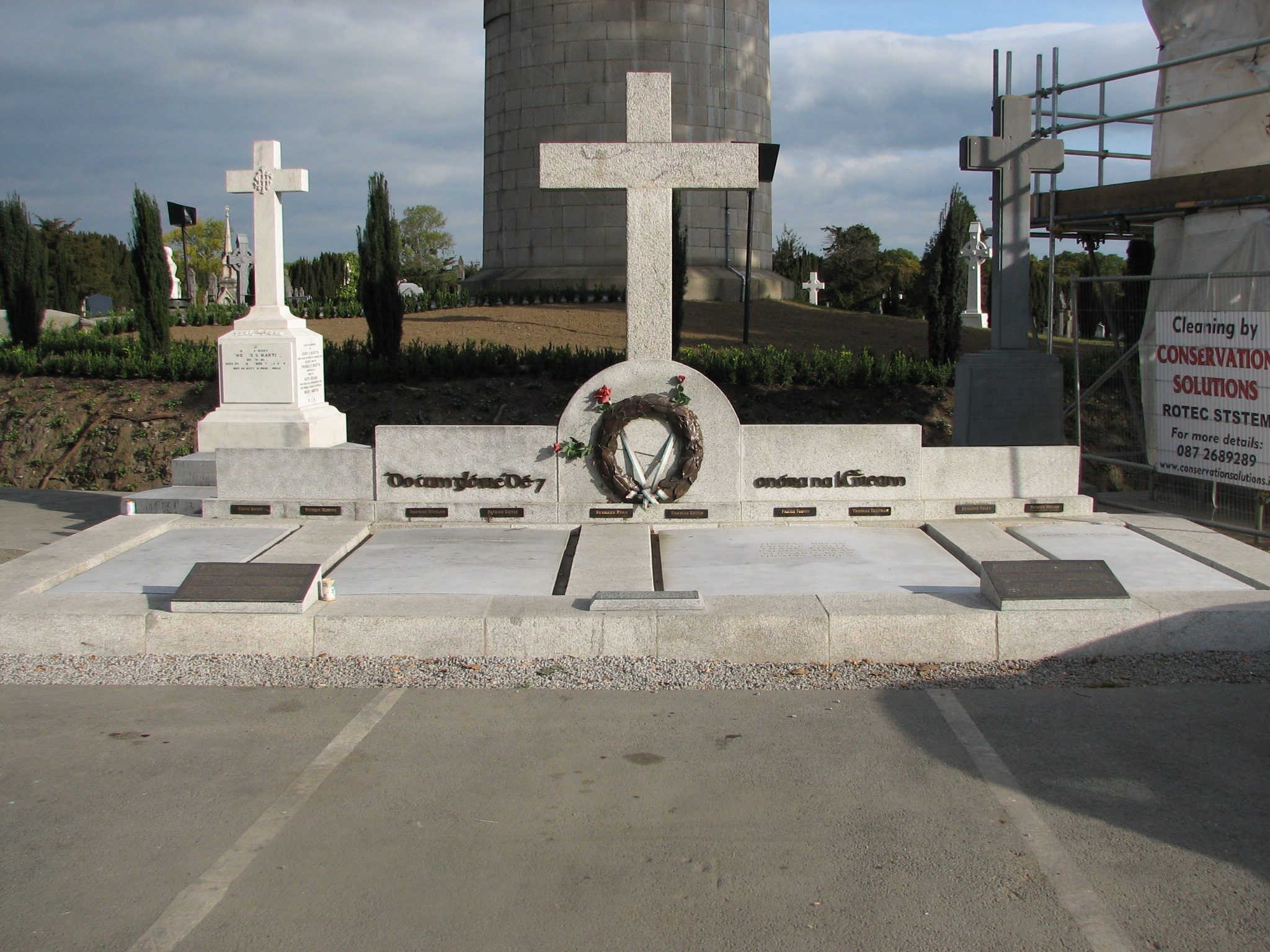
The grave of nine of the Forgotten Ten in Glasnevin Cemetery, Dublin

The campaign to rebury the men dragged on for 80 years from their deaths. Following an intense period of negotiations, the Irish government relented. Plans to exhume the bodies of the 10 men were announced on 1 November 2000, the 80th anniversary of the execution of Kevin Barry. On 14 October 2001, the Forgotten Ten were afforded full state honours, with a private service at Mountjoy Prison for the families of the dead, a requiem mass at St Mary's Pro-Cathedral and burial in Glasnevin Cemetery.

According to The Guardian, some criticised the event as untimely. It coincided with the Fianna Fáil party conference and occurred at a delicate moment in the Northern Irish peace negotiations. The progress of the cortège through the centre of Dublin was witnessed by crowds estimated as being in the tens of thousands who broke into spontaneous applause as the coffins passed. On O'Connell Street, a lone piper played a lament as the cortege paused outside the General Post Office, the focal point of the 1916 Easter Rising. In his homily during the requiem mass, Cardinal Cahal Daly, a long-time critic of the IRA campaign in Northern Ireland, insisted that there was a clear distinction between the conflict of 1916–22 and the paramilitary-led violence of the previous 30 years:

The true inheritors today of the ideals of the men and women of 1916 to 1922 are those who are explicitly and visibly committed to leaving the physical force tradition behind... Surely this state funeral can be an occasion for examination of conscience about the ideals of the men who died, and about our responsibility for translating those ideals into today's realities.

In his graveside oration the Taoiseach Bertie Ahern echoed these sentiments and also paid tribute to the Ten:

These 10 young men were executed during the War of Independence. The country was under tremendous pressure at the time. There was a united effort. Meanwhile, elected by the people, Dáil Éireann was developing, in spite of a war going on. Democracy was being put to work. Independent civic institutions, including the Dáil courts, were beginning to function. Before their deaths, the ten had seen the light of freedom. They understood that Ireland would be free and independent.

The state funeral, broadcast live on national television and radio, was only the 13th since independence. Patrick Maher would not be reburied with his comrades. In accordance with his wishes, and those of his family, he was reinterred in Ballylanders, County Limerick.

A feature length Irish language documentary on the re-interments, An Deichniúr Dearmadta (The Forgotten Ten) aired on TG4 on 28 March 2002.

== Partial Photo gallery ==
The Ten

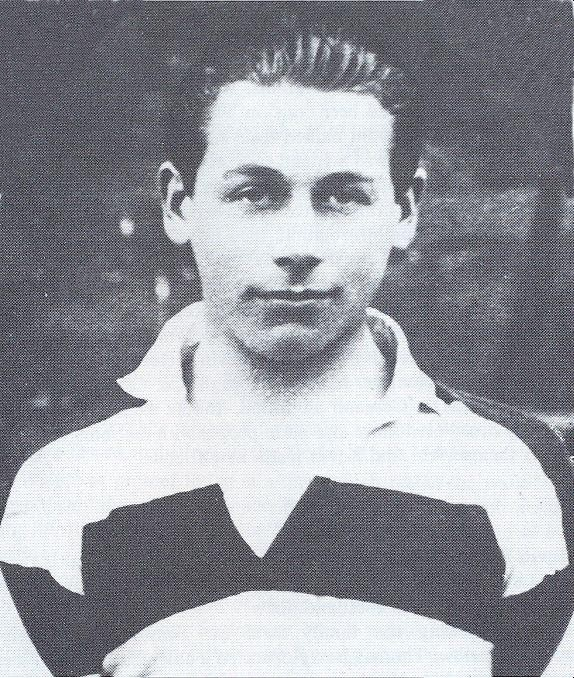
Kevin Barry

Thomas Bryan

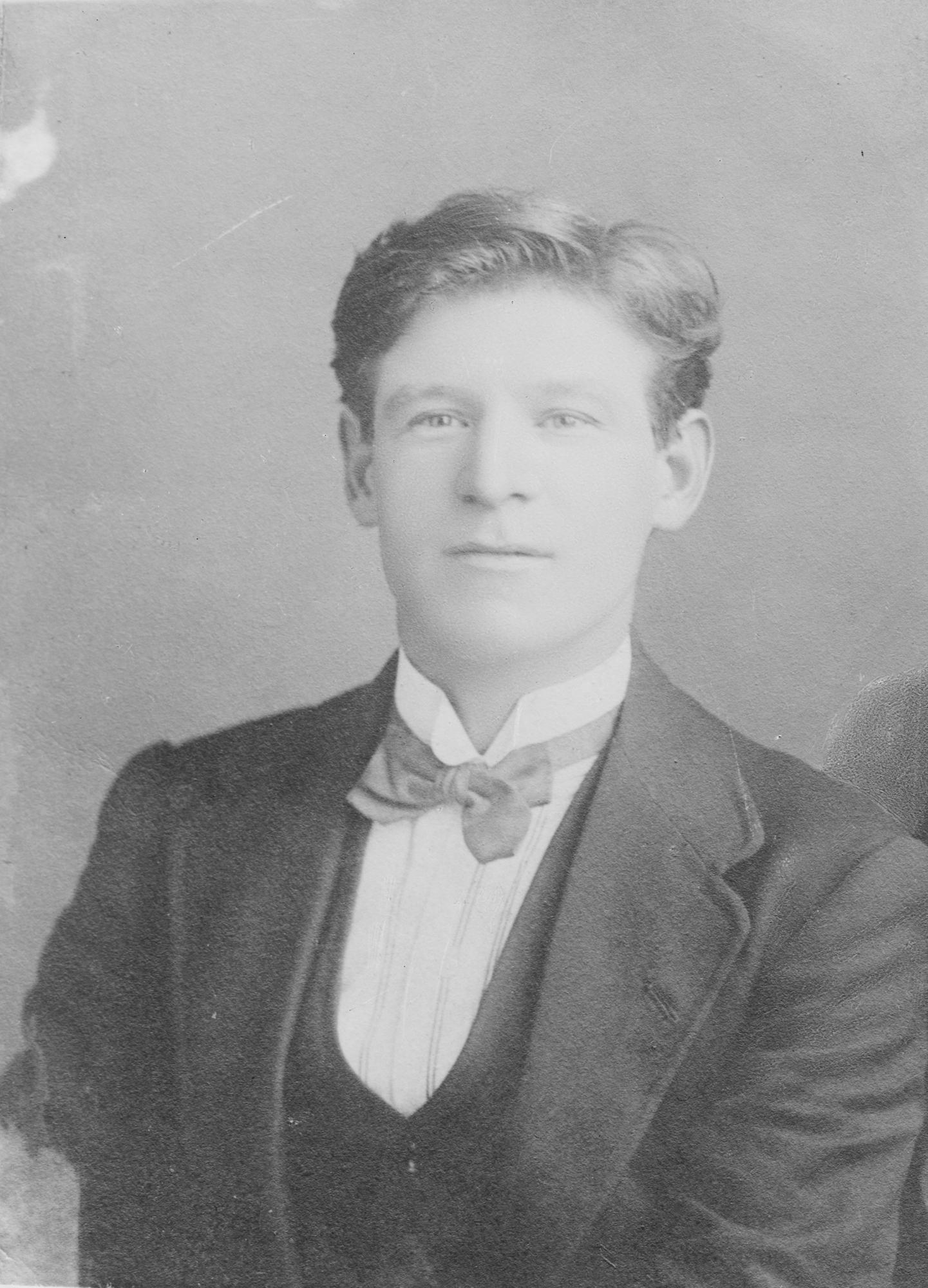
Patrick Doyle

Patrick Maher

Patrick Moran

Bernard Ryan

Thomas Traynor

Thomas Whelan

== Bibliography ==
- Carey, Tim: The Forgotten Ten: A Documentary History (2001); ISBN 1-84131-547-8
- O'Donovan, Donal: Barry and his Time (1989); ISBN 0-907606-67-9
