= Patrick Maher (Irish republican) =

Irish republican (c.1889–1921)

- Born: c. 1889; County Limerick, Ireland
- Died: 7 June 1921 (aged 32/33); Mountjoy Jail, Dublin, Ireland
- Cause of death: Execution by hanging
- Occupation: Railway worker
- Known for: Executed IRA volunteer : One of The Forgotten Ten

Patrick Maher (c. 1889 – 7 June 1921) was a member of the Irish Republican Army executed in Mountjoy Prison. He was 32 years old at the time of his death.

== Background ==
A native of County Limerick, Maher was hanged along with Edmond Foley for his alleged involvement in the rescue of Seán Hogan at Knocklong Railway Station on 13 May 1919 in which two Royal Irish Constabulary (RIC) officers were killed.

== Trial and execution ==
Unlike Foley, Maher had no direct involvement in the rescue. He merely worked at the station grading poultry and eggs and he was at a crossroads three miles away at the time of the ambush. Maher strongly protested his innocence. Two civilian juries failed to reach a verdict. He was finally convicted of involvement by a military court-martial and sentenced to death.

In a final message to other members of the IRA, Foley and Maher wrote:

Fight on, struggle on, for the honour, glory and freedom of dear old Ireland. Our hearts go out to all our dear old friends. Our souls go to God at 7 o'clock in the morning and our bodies, when Ireland is free, shall go to Galbally. Our blood shall not be shed in vain for Ireland, and we have a strong presentiment, going to our God, that Ireland will soon be free and we gladly give our lives that a smile may brighten the face of 'Dear Dark Rosaleen'. Farewell! Farewell! Farewell!

== Reinterment ==
Maher is one of a group of men hanged and buried in Mountjoy in the period 1920–21, commonly referred to as The Forgotten Ten. In 2001 Maher and the other nine, including Kevin Barry, were exhumed and given a full State funeral.

He is the only one of the ten men not to be buried in Glasnevin Cemetery, Dublin. In accordance with his wishes and those of his family, he is buried at Ladywell Graveyard in Ballylanders, County Limerick.
