= Frank Flood =

Irish independence fighter (1901–1922)

- Signed photograph of Frank Flood
- Born: Francis Xavier Flood; 1 December 1901; Dublin, Ireland
- Died: 14 March 1921 (aged 19); Mountjoy Prison, Dublin, Ireland
- Cause of death: Execution by hanging
- Occupation: University student
- Known for: Being one of the Forgotten Ten

Francis Xavier Flood (1 December 1901 – 14 March 1921) was a 1st Lieutenant in the Dublin Active Service Brigade during the Irish War of Independence. He was executed by the British authorities in Mountjoy Prison and was one of the men commonly referred to as the Forgotten Ten.

== Background ==
Flood was born at 6 Emmet Street, Dublin on 1 December 1901. He was the son of policeman John Flood and Sarah Murphy. The 1911 census lists the family living at 15 Emmet Street. He was one of eight brothers and he had one sister, most of whom were heavily involved in the Independence movement. He attended secondary school in O'Connell Schools, Dublin and won a scholarship to study engineering at University College Dublin where he was an active member of UCD's famous debating forum, the Literary and Historical Society. He passed his first and second year engineering exams with distinction. At the time of his arrest he was living with his family at 30 Summerhill Parade, Dublin.

== Trial and execution ==
He was captured, together with Thomas Bryan, Patrick Doyle, Bernard Ryan and Dermot O'Sullivan while attacking a lorry-load of Dublin Metropolitan Police at Drumcondra on 21 January 1921. All of the men were found in possession of arms and a grenade was discovered in Flood's pocket. On 24 February 1921 Flood was charged by Court-martial, with high treason/levying war against the King, and was one of six men executed by hanging on 14 March 1921 in Mountjoy Prison, Dublin. At nineteen years of age, he was the youngest of the six.

== Legacy and re-interment ==
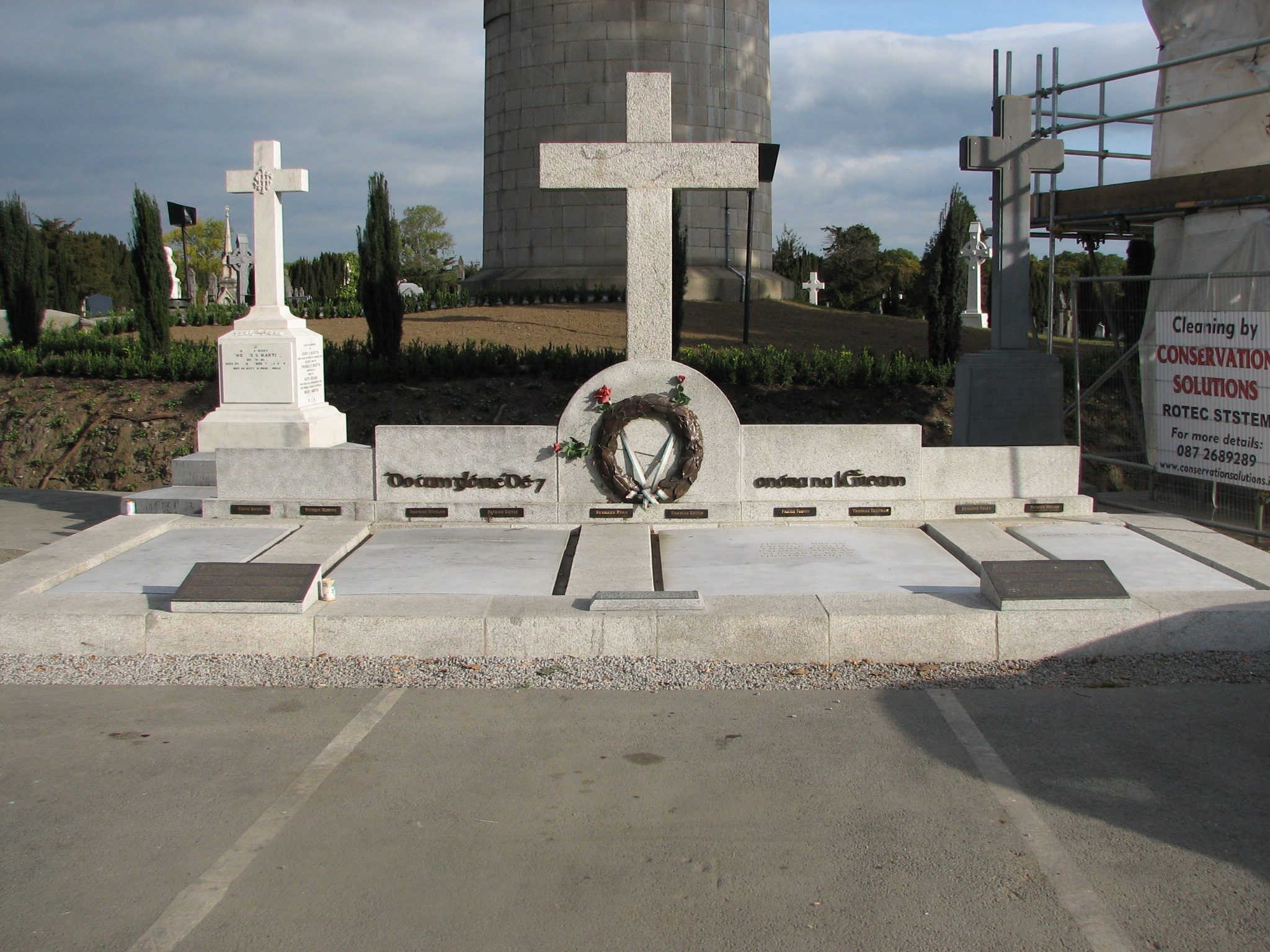
The grave of nine of the Forgotten Ten in Glasnevin Cemetery, Dublin

Flood was a close personal friend of Kevin Barry, and asked that he be buried as close as possible to him. He had taken part in the September 1920 ambush during which Barry had been arrested and had been involved in the planning of several aborted attempts to rescue him. Flood would remain buried at Mountjoy Prison, together with nine other executed members of the Irish Republican Army known as The Forgotten Ten, until he was given a state funeral and reburied at Glasnevin Cemetery on 14 October 2001 after an intense campaign led by the National Graves Association.

Students of University College Dublin established the Frank Flood Shield, an annual debating competition, in his memory. Flood and the other five men executed on 14 March 1921 are commemorated in Thomas MacGreevy's poem "The Six who were Hanged".

The bridge over the River Tolka in Drumcondra at Millmount Avenue/Botanic Avenue was named Droichead Frank Flood on 14 March 2018. A memorial to Flood was erected by his parents in Kilbarrack Cemetery.

== References and sources ==
Notes

Sources

- White, Gerry; Brendan O'Shea; William Youngshusband (2003). Irish Volunteer Soldier 1913-23. Oxford: Osprey. p. 70. ISBN 978-1-84176-685-0.
