= Thomas Whelan =

Executed IRA member

- Born: 5 October 1898; Gortrummagh, Clifden, County Galway, Ireland
- Died: 14 March 1921 (aged 22); Mountjoy Jail, Dublin, Ireland
- Cause of death: Execution by hanging
- Resting place: Glasnevin Cemetery
- Occupation: Railway worker
- Known for: Executed IRA volunteer : One of The Forgotten Ten
- Military career
- Allegiance: Irish Republic
- Branch: Irish Volunteers; Irish Republican Army
- Units: A Company, 3rd Battalion, Dublin Brigade
- Conflicts: Irish War of Independence

Thomas Whelan (/ˈhwiːlən/; 5 October 1898 – 14 March 1921) was one of six men executed in Mountjoy Prison, Dublin on 14 March 1921. He was 22 years old at the time of his death.

== Background ==
Whelan was born in Gortrummagh near Clifden, County Galway, to farmer John Whelan and Bridget Price on 5 (or 15) October 1898, the sixth child of thirteen. He attended national school at Beleek and Clifden, before leaving school at 15 to work on his father's farm. He moved to Dublin at the age of 18, where he found work as a railwayman, and joined the Irish Volunteers as a member of 'A' Company, 3rd Battalion, Dublin Brigade. He lived at Barrow Street, Ringsend, Dublin and worked at a train depot.

== Arrest and execution ==
He was arrested on 23 November 1920 and, on 1 February 1921, he was charged with the death by shooting of Captain G.T. Baggallay, an army prosecutor who had been a member of courts that sentenced Volunteers to death under the Restoration of Order in Ireland Regulations on Bloody Sunday (1920).

Whelan was defended at his Court-martial by Michael Noyk, through whom he protested his innocence of the charges. As in the case of Patrick Moran, there was eyewitness evidence that Whelan had been at Mass at the time the shooting took place.

The prosecution cast doubt on the reliability of the eyewitnesses, arguing that as Catholics they were not neutral. The defence complained that it was unfair to suggest the witnesses "were prepared to come up and perjure themselves on behalf of the prisoner" because "they belonged to a certain class and might hold certain political opinions".

The military court did, however, trust the evidence of an army officer who lived in the same house as Baggallay and who had identified Whelan as the man covering him with a revolver during the raid. There was also testimony by a soldier who had passed by the house when he heard shots fired. This witness said he saw Whelan outside, attempting to start his motorcycle. Whelan was found guilty of murder and sentenced to death.

In Mountjoy Gaol, he was imprisoned with the writer and activist Ernie O'Malley, who described him as:

"... smooth-faced, quiet and brown eyed with wavy hair; he smiled quietly and steadily. His voice was soft and when he laughed with the others one knew that the fibre was not as hard and that there was a shade of wistfulness about him."

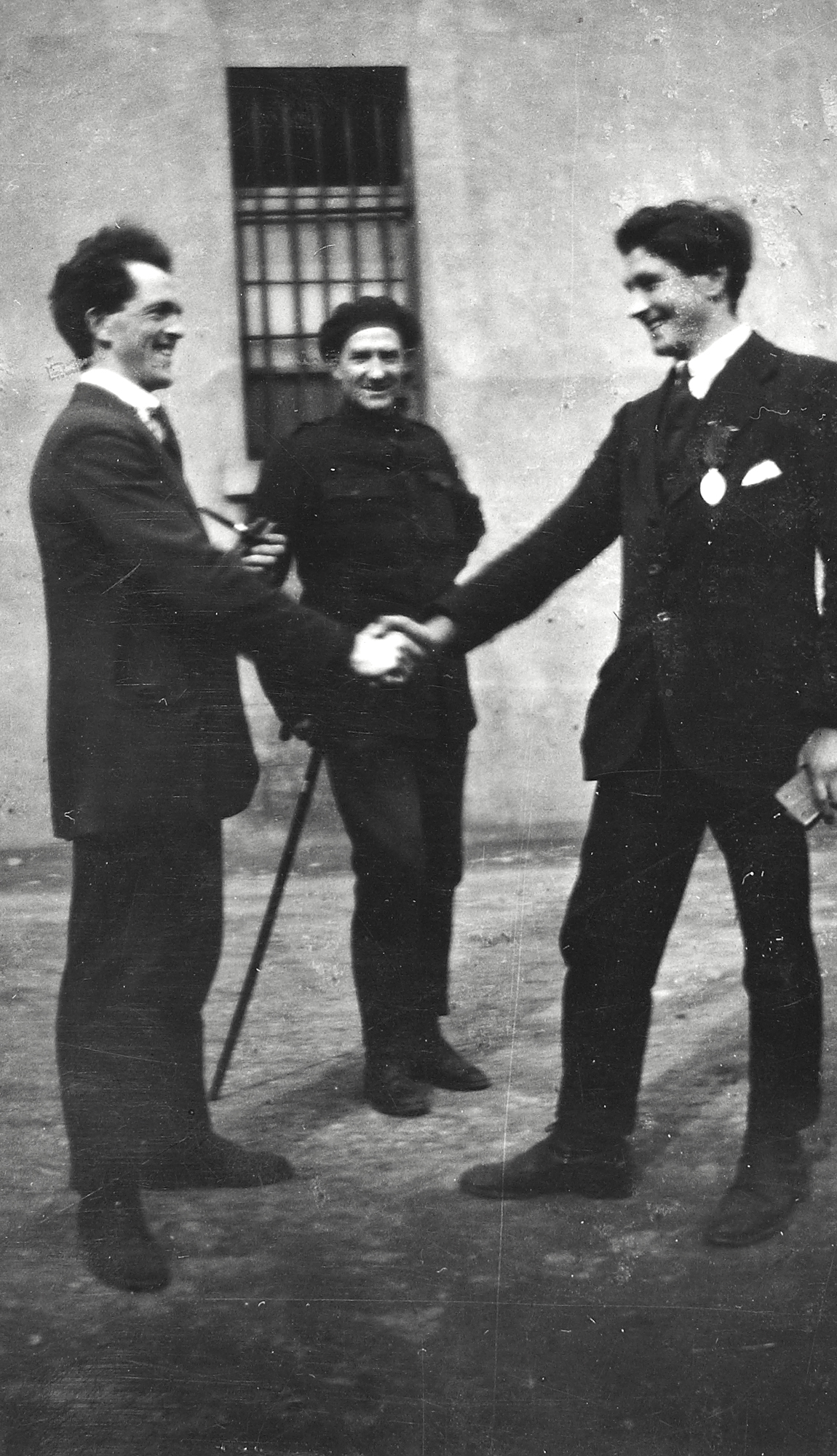
Patrick Moran and Thomas Whelan Mountjoy Prison 14 March 1921

Whelan was quoted just before being hanged: "Give the boys my love. Tell them to follow on and never surrender. Tell them I am proud to die for Ireland."

Whelan was hanged at 6.00 am along with Patrick Moran, the first of six men to be executed that day – the six were executed in twos. A crowd estimated at 40,000 gathered outside the prison to pray as the executions took place. His mother, Bridget, saw him before his execution, and waited outside with the praying crowd holding candles. She told a reporter that she had left her son "so happy and cheerful you would almost imagine he was going to see a football match".

== Aftermath Violence ==
Following the Two for One policy that decreed the assassination of two members of the Royal Irish Constabulary (RIC) in retaliation for every executed Irish Volunteer, the IRA in Whelan's native Clifden ambushed and fatally shot RIC Constables Charles Reynolds and Thomas Sweeney at Eddie King's Corner in on 16 March 1921. In response to the RIC's request for assistance over the wireless, a trainload of Black and Tans arrived in Clifden from Galway City in the early hours of St Patrick's Day, 17 March 1921, and proceeded to "burn, plunder and murder". During what is now called, "The Burning of Clifden", the Black and Tans killed one local civilian (John McDonnell), seriously injured another, burned down 14 houses, and damaged several others.

== Reinterment ==
He was one of a group of men hanged in Mountjoy Prison in the period 1920-1921 who are commonly referred to as The Forgotten Ten. In 2001 he and the other nine, including Kevin Barry, were exhumed from their graves in Mountjoy prison and given a full state funeral. He is now buried in Glasnevin Cemetery, Dublin. An annual commemoration is still held in Clifden for him.
