= Mountjoy Prison =

Prison in Dublin, Ireland

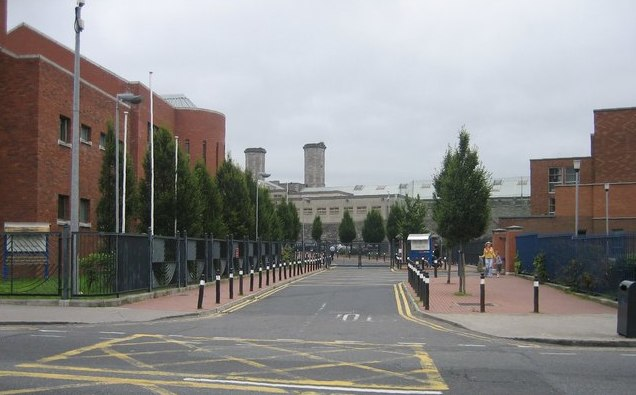
- View of the prison from North Circular Road

- Location in Central Dublin
- Location: North Circular Road; Phibsborough; Dublin 7; D07 KTC1; 53°21′42″N 06°16′03″W
- Status: Operational
- Security class: Medium security
- Capacity: 831
- Population: 1120 (2026)
- Opened: 1850; 176 years ago
- Managed by: Irish Prison Service
- Governor: Ray Murtagh

Mountjoy Prison (Irish: Príosún Mhuinseo), founded as Mountjoy Gaol and nicknamed The Joy, is a medium security men's prison located in Phibsborough in the centre of Dublin, Ireland. The current prison Governor is Ray Murtagh.

== History ==
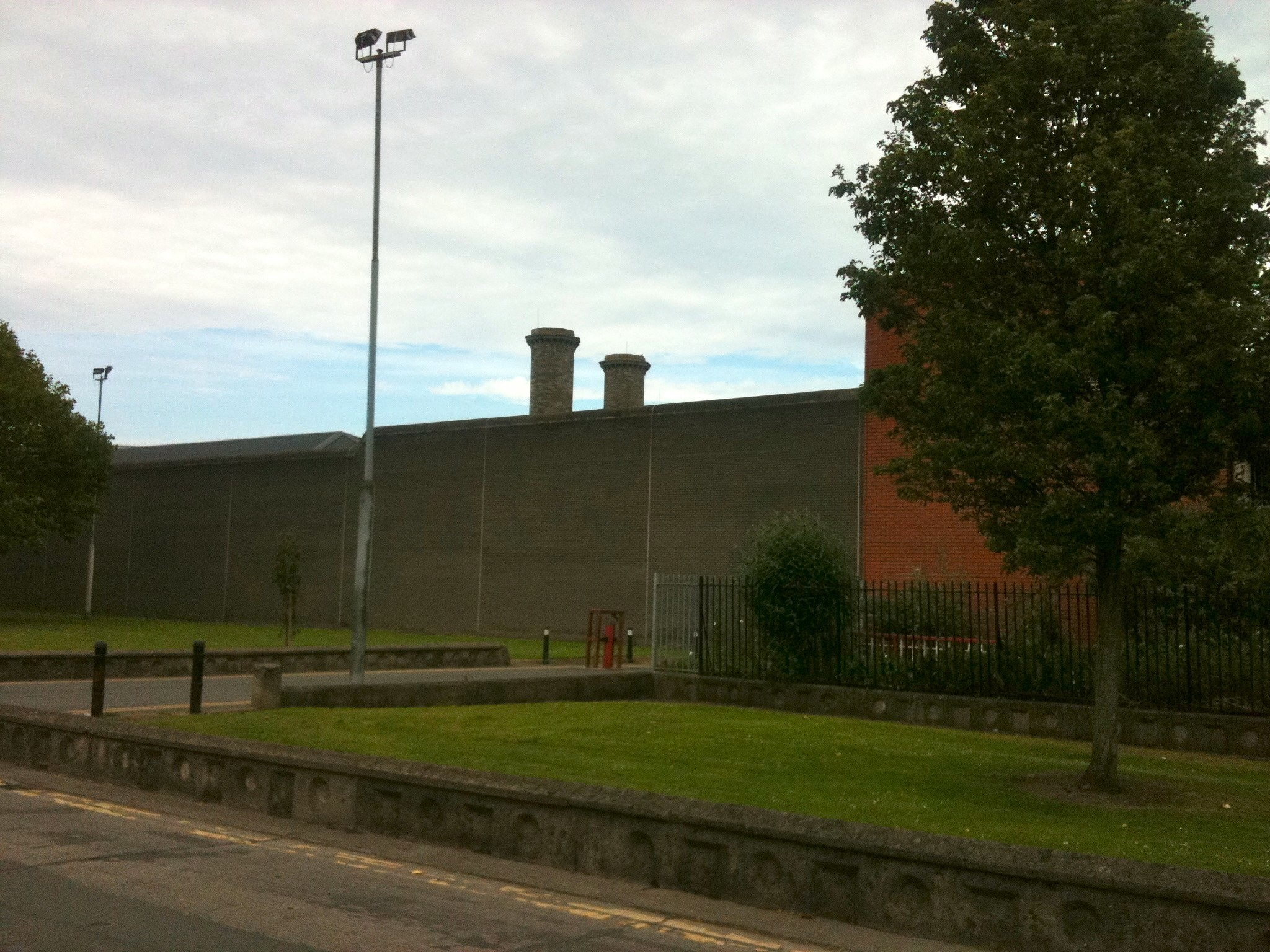
Mountjoy Prison, seen from Devery's Lane.

Mountjoy was designed by Captain Joshua Jebb of the Royal Engineers and opened in 1850. It was based on the design of London's Pentonville Prison also designed by Jebb. Originally intended as the first stop for men sentenced to transportation, they would spend a period in separate confinement before being transferred to Spike Island and transported from there to Van Diemen's Land. On 7 April 1919 twenty Sinn Féin prisoners escaped from Mountjoy including the MPs J. J. Walsh and Piaras Béaslaí. Peadar Clancy and IRA Chief of Staff Richard Mulcahy were responsible for the planning and execution of the escape.

A total of 46 prisoners (including one woman, Annie Walsh) were executed within the walls of the prison, prior to the abolition of capital punishment. Executions were carried out by hanging and firing squads, after which the bodies of the dead were taken down from the gallows and buried within the prison grounds in unmarked graves. Large crowds would routinely gather just outside the prison on the day of an execution, loudly singing and praying for the condemned man. The list of Irish republican prisoners executed at Mountjoy Prison includes:

- Kevin Barry
- Patrick Moran
- Frank Flood
- Thomas Whelan
- Thomas Traynor
- Patrick Doyle
- Thomas Bryan
- Bernard Ryan
- Edmond Foley
- Patrick Maher
- Rory O'Connor
- Joe McKelvey
- Liam Mellows
- Richard Barrett
- Thomas Harte
- Patrick McGrath
- Maurice O'Neill
- Charlie Kerins

In addition, Annie Walsh from Limerick, who was found guilty of murdering her husband, was executed in Mountjoy prison on 5 August 1925. She remains the only woman ever executed by the Irish State after its founding in 1922.

On 13 October 1923, Irish Republican prisoners in Mountjoy Prison began the 1923 Irish Hunger Strikes, protesting being interned without charges or trial and poor prison conditions. Close to 500 men began the hunger strike in Mountjoy and the strike quickly spread to other camps and prisons with over 5,000 prisoners taking part nationwide. Andy O'Sullivan, from County Cavan, died on hunger strike on 23 November 1923 in Mountjoy Prison.

After being convicted of murdering a Garda officer, Charlie Kerins, former Chief of Staff to the Anti-Treaty IRA, was hanged at Mountjoy Prison on 1 December 1944.

The last execution carried out in the Republic of Ireland, that of Michael Manning, took place in Mountjoy Prison on 20 April 1954.

Some Irish leaders involved with the Irish War of Independence and Irish Civil War were held there. On 14 May 1921, an IRA team led by Paddy Daly and Emmet Dalton mounted an attempt to rescue Sean McEoin from the prison. They used a captured armoured car to gain access to Mountjoy, but were discovered and had to shoot their way out.

The Fenian poet, author of the popular song "Rising of the Moon", John Keegan 'Leo' Casey was imprisoned here during the 1860s; subsequently in the 20th century, playwright and IRA activist Brendan Behan was also gaoled within.

On 31 October 1973, it was the scene of a spectacular escape by a hijacked helicopter by three Provisional Irish Republican Army prisoners, Kevin Mallon, Seamus Twomey and Joe B. O'Hagan.

By 2006, a 60-hectare site had been acquired for €30 million at Thornton Hall, Fingal, where a replacement for Mountjoy was to be constructed. The new facility was intended to accommodate 1,400 prisoners. The site was planned to include court facilities, video-conference links, medical and therapeutic facilities, but due to government cutbacks these plans have now been sidelined.

== Incidents ==
In August 2006, prisoners who were normally separated from the rest of the population for safety were mixed together for a night with mentally ill inmate Stephen Egan. Prisoner Gary Douche was killed by Egan who was found not guilty of murder due to a lack of responsibility. This prompted the Minister of Justice to seek a limit of 520 inmates on the capacity of the prison.

In October 2010, the prison was placed under lockdown after a night of violence and rioting involving more than 70 inmates. It started when a number of prisoners attacked three prison officers with pool cues and balls during recreation. Reinforcements were brought in from around Dublin to quell the riot and a number of Alsatians dogs from the riot unit were also deployed.

In 2016, figures were released showing that Mountjoy Prison saw a disproportionate number of prisoners hospitalised due to assaults and self-harm. In response, the Irish Penal Reform Trust said the "ongoing levels of violence and intimidation in Irish prisons, particularly in Mountjoy Prison, must be addressed".

== Composition ==
=== Main Prison ===
Mountjoy Prison is constructed along a radial design with four main wings, A through D, each of which has three landings, as well as an underground basement landing. The wings are connected to a central circle, known simply as 'the circle'. When originally built in 1850 it had 500 cells each of which was designed for single capacity. Many parts of the original building have either been renovated or destroyed. At the time of the 2009 inspection, there were 371 cells in the main unit of the prison. These are the original cells which were built in 1850 for single occupancy. Their size varies from 3.91 m × 2.06 m to 3.43 m × 2.06 m. The prison was built with in-cell sanitation but this was removed in 1939 when it was deemed that 'prisoners were using too much water'. However, all cells in the main jail have in-cell sanitation following refurbishment in the period 2010 to 2015. These cells contain a toilet, a sink, a television and a small kettle.

Facilities in the prison include gymnasiums, computer classes, carpentry, masonry and a wide variety of school activities such as music, drama and cookery. Prisoners can undertake to complete academic exams in school such as Junior Certificate, Leaving Certificate and Open University. Additionally, there is an on-site kitchen and bakery where trusted inmates are given employment under supervision.

=== Medical Unit ===
The Medical Unit, otherwise referred to as the drug detoxification unit, is a three-storied structure. It provides accommodation for sixty prisoners in forty-eight single-person cells and three cells that can accommodate up to four people. All the cells in this unit have in-cell sanitation facilities. It is equipped with medical facilities, classrooms and kitchen facilities. The Inspector of Prisons reported in 2009 that this unit was bright and clean and did not suffer from overcrowding.

=== Controlled Behavioural Unit ===
The Controlled Behavioural Unit, known as the CBU or the Block, is used for unruly prisoners or those on punishment and is located in the 'C' Base, underneath the C wing. This includes 24-hour lock-up, with the exception of one hour of open-air exercise, and no integration with other inmates.

=== Separation Unit ===
The Separation Unit had 35 cells. It also had kitchen facilities a shower block and a laundry. In the late 1980s, inmates diagnosed with HIV or AIDS were housed in the separation unit. This policy was brought to an end on 1 January 1995. Following the unit's refurbishment in 1997, all cells had in-cell sanitation. The separation unit was closed indefinitely in 2014 following an inspection by the Inspector of Prisons.

== Mountjoy Campus ==
The Mountjoy Campus is home to three other separate penal facilities.

- Dóchas Centre
- St. Patrick's Institution
- Training Unit

== People associated with Mountjoy ==
A former governor was Charles Arthur Munro, brother of the Edwardian satirist Saki.

The schizophrenic French surrealist playwright Antonin Artaud was briefly detained in Mountjoy before his deportation from Ireland as "a destitute and undesirable alien".

During the Irish War of Independence many notable Irish Republican women were imprisoned in Mountjoy to include: Constance Markievicz, Eithne Coyle, Maire Comerford, Sighle Humphreys, Lily O'Brennan and Linda Kearns.

Thomas Ashe was also a former inmate of the jail for his involvement in the Easter Rising 1916. After a protest of starvation, he was transferred across the street to the Mater Misericordiae Hospital on 25 September 1916 where he died a few hours after arrival.

Peadar O'Donnell, IRA Commander of the 2nd Northern Division, was imprisoned in Mountjoy Gaol and the Curragh. Following the end of the Irish Civil War, he participated in the mass republican hunger strike, remaining on hunger strike for 41 days. O'Donnell's prison experience and eventual escape in March 1924 are described in his 1932 memoir The Gates Flew Open.

== In popular culture ==
Morrissey's 2014 album World Peace Is None of Your Business by includes a song called Mountjoy about the prison.

== See also ==
- Executions during the Irish Civil War
- Kilmainham Gaol, a former prison located in Kilmainham, Dublin, and is now a museum.
- Loughan House, a low-security open centre in County Cavan also run by the Irish Prison Service.
- Prisons in Ireland
