= Patrick Doyle (Irish republican) =

Irish republican

- Born: 28 August 1889; Dublin, Ireland
- Died: 14 March 1921 (aged 31); Mountjoy Jail, Dublin, Ireland
- Cause of death: Execution by hanging
- Occupation: Carpenter
- Known for: Executed IRA volunteer : One of The Forgotten Ten

Patrick Arthur Doyle (28 August 1889 – 14 March 1921) was one of six men hanged in Mountjoy Prison on the morning of 14 March 1921. He was aged 31 and lived at St. Mary's Place, Dublin. He was one of The Forgotten Ten.

== Background ==
Doyle was involved in an arms raid on Collinstown Aerodrome in 1919. Together with Frank Flood, he was involved in planning several attempts to free Kevin Barry from Mountjoy in the days before Barry's own execution in November 1920. Flood would later be hanged on the same morning as Doyle.

== Arrest, detention and execution ==
Doyle was a member of 'F' Company, 1st Battalion, Dublin Brigade, Irish Republican Army and was tried on 24 February 1921 by court-martial, charged with high treason and levying war against the King for his part in an attempted ambush at Drumcondra on 21 January that year. The six men were hanged in pairs beginning at 6 in the morning.

He was a carpenter and married with four children. His wife gave birth to twins shortly before his death, one of whom died on 12 March. Reportedly, she caught a chill returning from a visit to the prison. Doyle's brother Seán was killed in action at the Custom House six weeks after the execution.

== Re-interment ==
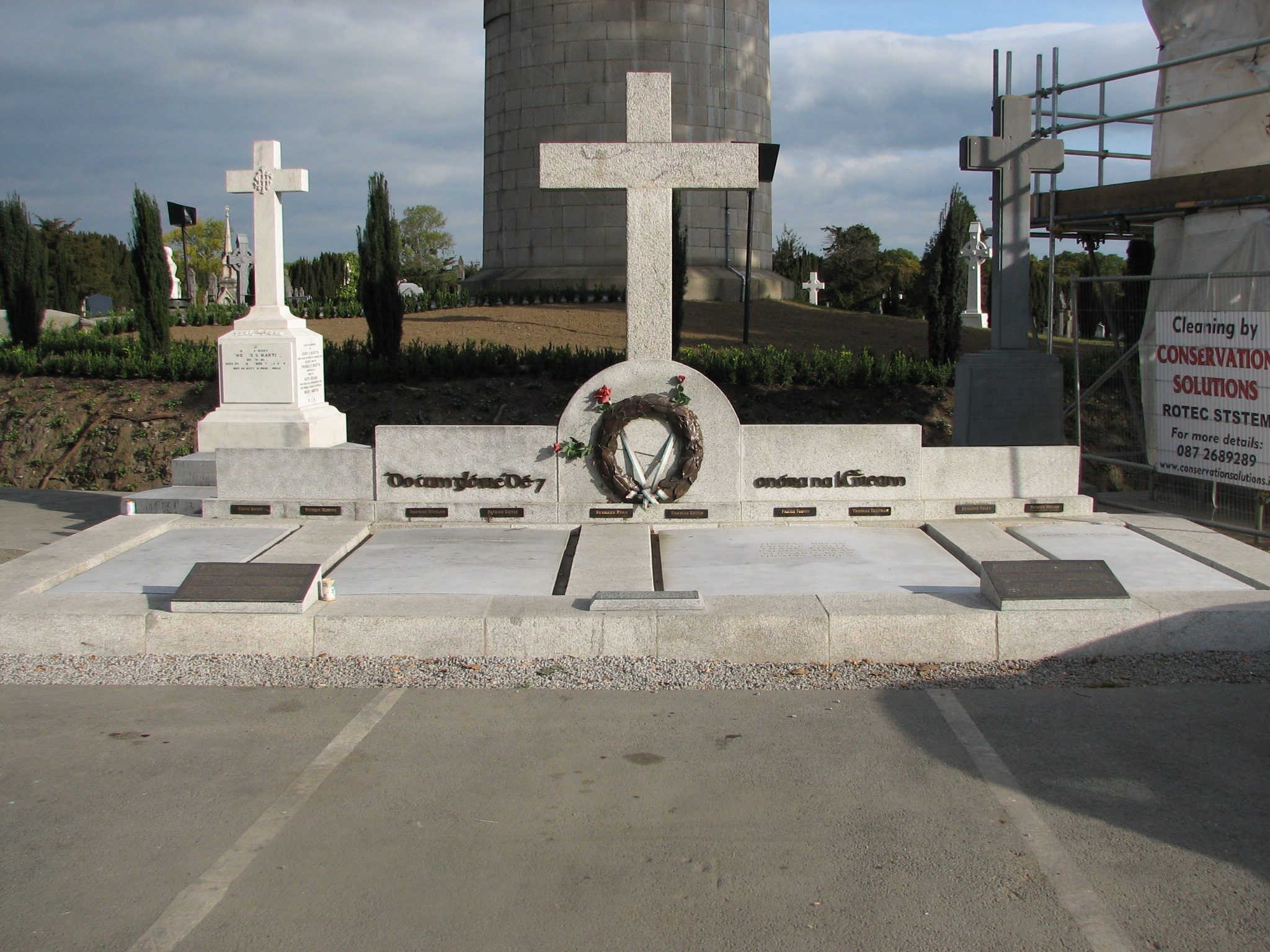
The Grave of nine of the Forgotten Ten in Glasnevin Cemetery, Dublin

He is one of a group of men hanged in Mountjoy Prison in the period 1920-1921 commonly referred to as The Forgotten Ten. In 2001 he and the other nine, including Kevin Barry and Frank Flood, were exhumed from their graves in the prison and given a full State Funeral. He is now buried in Glasnevin Cemetery, Dublin.
