= Patrick Moran (Irish republican) =

Irish republican

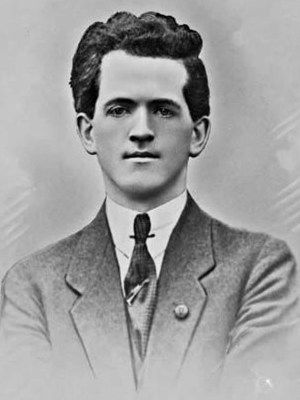
- Born: 14 March 1888; Crossna, County Roscommon
- Died: 14 March 1921 (aged 33); Mountjoy Gaol, Dublin, Ireland
- Cause of death: Execution by hanging
- Other names: Paddy Moran
- Known for: Executed IRA volunteer (One of "the Forgotten Ten")

Patrick Moran (14 March 1888 – 14 March 1921) was a grocer's assistant, trade unionist and member of the Irish Republican Army executed in Mountjoy Prison along with five other men on 14 March 1921. He is one of those who were dubbed "The Forgotten Ten".

== Background ==
Moran was born in Crossna, Ardcarn, County Roscommon, the third of eleven children of Bartholomew and Brigid Moran. He attended primary school in Crossna before going to work as a grocer's assistant in Boyle. In 1911, he settled in Dublin.

An active member of the Gaelic Athletic Association, he was involved in the 1913 Dublin Lock-out. He was a member of the Irish Republican Brotherhood and the Irish Volunteers. As Adjutant of D Company, 2nd Battalion of the Dublin section of the Volunteers he fought in the Jacob's Factory Garrison during the Easter Rising of 1916 under Thomas MacDonagh.

In the aftermath of the Easter Rising, he was imprisoned at Knutsford Prison and later at Frongoch. He was tried in Wormwood Scrubs and released in July 1916.

In 1917, he was a founder of the Irish National Union of Vintners, Grocers and Allied Trades Assistants. He went on to serve as the organisation's president and chairman of its Kingstown branch.

== Arrest and detention ==
After his release from internment, Moran became a captain in 'D' Company of the 2nd Battalion, Dublin Brigade, IRA. He was arrested on one occasion in 1920 during a strike for better conditions for members of his union and was imprisoned in Mountjoy for two weeks when he refused to take bail as he said he had done no wrong. He was arrested at his place of work on the Friday after Bloody Sunday (1920) and taken to the Bridewell Station. He was transferred two weeks later to Arbour Hill.

During the Bloody Sunday action to wipe out a group of Dublin -based British spymasters known as the Cairo Gang, on 21 November 1920, Moran headed the IRA squad that killed two men in the Gresham Hotel in O'Connell Street: Leonard Wilde, a former British Consul in Spain, and Patrick Joseph MacCormack, a World War I veteran and ex-jockey. MacCormack's mother, Kate, a veteran of the Land War and relative of Michael Davitt who lived in Dun Laoghaire, mounted a vigorous campaign to clear her son's name of what she saw as the taint of being a British spy.

While in detention at Arbour Hill Prison, Moran was subjected to a number of identity parades and identified as being the man who had held up a motor cyclist outside 38 Mount Street, Dublin where Lt. Peter Ashmun Ames, an American-born British military intelligence officer, was murdered (21 November 1920). Moran strongly protested his innocence of involvement in that incident on Bloody Sunday. He claimed he was at Mass in Blackrock (over four miles from the scene of the shooting) at the time. Several witnesses supported this alibi evidence, but it was deemed to be false.

However, witnesses including a church rector, responding to the claim by military witnesses to have known the time by the chiming of the church bell, revealed that the bell had not chimed for years. The sexton said it had not chimed for 10 years.

== Conviction and execution ==
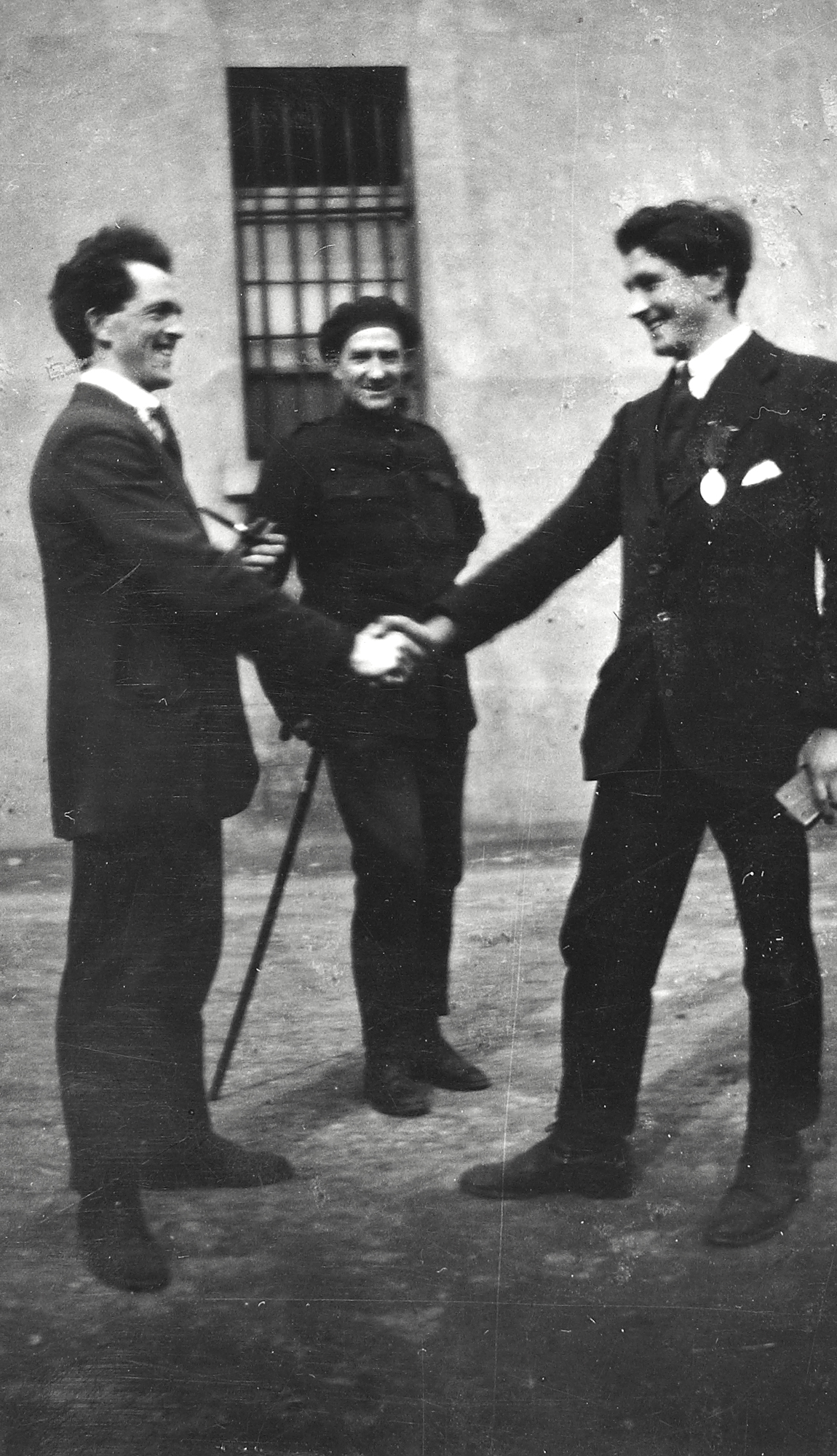
Patrick Moran (left) and Thomas Whelan (right), shortly before they were hanged for their part in the assassinations. Between them is an Auxiliary officer.

He was transferred from Arbour Hill to Kilmainham Jail and incarcerated in what was known as the "Murderers' Gallery", two cells away from Ernie O'Malley, with whom he became good friends.

On 14 February 1921, Moran, O'Malley and Frank Teeling broke through the padlock of an outer gate of the prison. However, Moran refused to take the opportunity to escape as he reportedly felt the authorities would interpret it as an admission of guilt, telling O'Malley "I don't want to let down the witnesses who gave evidence for me."

Moran started a concert to distract the guards while the men escaped, with Simon Donnelly taking Moran's place. The event is related in detail in O'Malley's memoir On Another Man's Wound. He was tried the day following the break out in City Hall, Dame Street, Dublin. Moran was convicted of murder by a military court-martial three days later and sentenced to be hanged on 14 March 1921.

Moran and Thomas Whelan were tried for murder; Francis Flood, Thomas Bryan, Patrick Doyle and Bernard Ryan for high treason. They were all convicted and sentenced to death. The Roman Catholic Archbishop of Dublin William Walsh spoke out against the sentence.

The Irish National Union of Vintners' Grocers' & Allied Trades' Assistants, of which Moran had been an active member, called a half-day general strike on the morning of the executions and over 40,000 people gathered outside Mountjoy to pray for the six men who were hanged between 6am and 8pm. The townships of Bray, Dún Laoghaire, and Blackrock closed down, with the municipal flags flying at half-mast, on the day of his hanging, with Mass celebrated in all churches every hour from 6am to noon. All post office branches throughout Ireland stopped work.

== Aftermath and reinterment ==
In 1961, a park was opened in Moran's memory in Dún Laoghaire. He had worked in Dun Laoghaire from 1916-20 in the premises of Lynch and O'Brien. He moved to Magees in Blackrock just two months prior to his arrest in November 1920. In May 2012, the park was closed to the public as work commenced on the removal of the bowling green, and the construction of a library and cultural centre. In 2001, he and the other nine executed men (dubbed "the Forgotten Ten") were exhumed from their graves in the prison and given a full State Funeral. He is now buried in Glasnevin Cemetery, Dublin.

== Bibliography ==
- O'Malley, Ernie. On Another Man's Wound: A Personal History of Ireland's War of Independence (2002); ISBN 978-1-58979-004-9
