= Drangan =

Village in County Tipperary, Ireland

Drangan Drongán
- Village
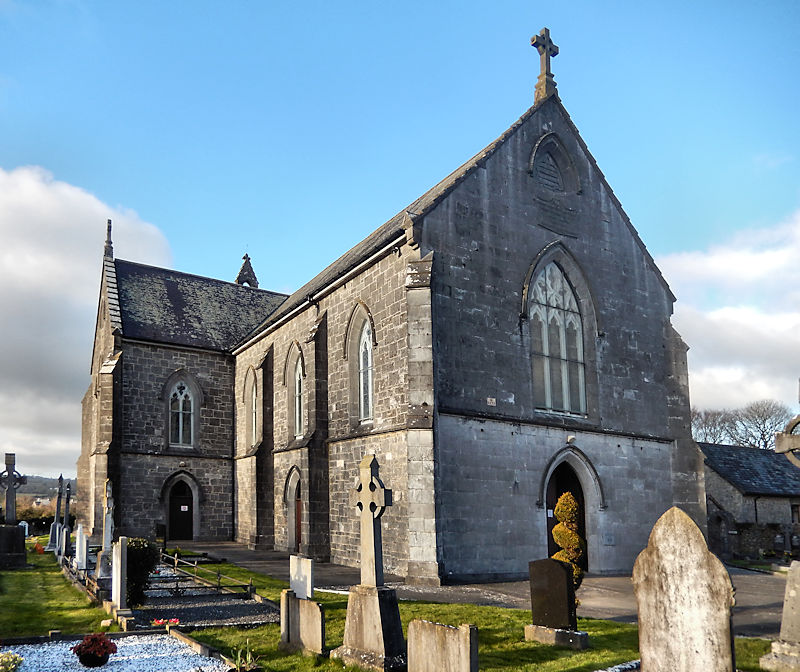
- Catholic church in Drangan, County Tipperary

- Location in Ireland
- Coordinates: 52°31′01″N 7°35′03″W
- Country: Ireland
- Province: Munster
- County: County Tipperary

Population (2016)
  - Total: 145
- Irish grid reference: S282406

Drangan (Irish: Drongán) is a village, urban area and civil parish in County Tipperary, Ireland. It is in the historical barony of Middlethird. As of the 2016 census, Drangan had a population of 145 people. It is approximately 19 km north of Clonmel.

The village's Catholic church, formerly known as Saint Mary's Catholic Church, is dedicated to the Immaculate Conception and was built in 1850. A statue of local Land League campaigner Michael Cusack, who died in 1909, was erected nearby c. 1913. During the Irish War of Independence in June 1920, the IRA's 3rd Tipperary Brigade (which included Seán Treacy, Dan Breen, Seán Hogan, Séumas Robinson and Ernie O'Malley) attacked and captured the Royal Irish Constabulary barracks in Drangan.

The local primary school, Drangan National School, is a co-educational school made up of St Patrick's Junior School and St Patrick's Senior School.

== See also ==
- Cloneen, County Tipperary
