= Sean C. Finn =

Sean C. Finn (born Michael John Finn; 1897, Rathkeale, County Limerick – 30 March 1921, near Foynes, County Limerick) was a commander of multiple units in the IRA's Irish War of Independence in the early 20th century. He led many attacks on the Black and Tans and the heavily armed RIC patrols, with his brigade usually armed only with shotguns.

Training first with the scouting organisation Fianna Éireann and then being appointed a captain in the Irish Volunteers in 1914 when Ernest Blythe went to Limerick to organise there, Finn organised his west Limerick area, making contacts ranging from impoverished farmers in single-room cottages to the nationalist Anglo-Irish activist Mary Spring Rice, whose boat was at the disposal of his flying columns to cross the River Shannon.

He and his flying columns made West Limerick untenable for the British. By spring 1917, he had 80 men in his brigade, and he continued to form companies in surrounding areas. In 1918 the area's Volunteers were organised into a battalion of the new Irish Republican Army, and Finn was soon appointed Brigade O/C. He brought the strength of the brigade up to 2,000 men.

Volunteers from the brigade guarded ballot boxes to prevent interference by the RIC; they sheltered Dan Breen, Seán Treacy, Séumas Robinson and Seán Hogan after the Soloheadbeg Ambush. They attacked RIC plainclothes officers guarding men buying cattle from boycotted farms.

On 7 July 13, 1920, a mixed RIC and Black and Tan patrol were attacked by the IRA under the command of Finn, and RIC Constable Patrick Fahey was killed.

Finn smuggled the British General Cuthbert Lucas, O/C of the British forces in the huge garrison of Fermoy, County Cork to the Shannon River while the British searched Lucas. (After he handed Lucas over to the East Limerick IRA, the general either escaped or was released to Pallaskenry Barracks on 30 July 1920.)

On 30 March 1921, Finn was killed in action during a three-hour engagement the Ballyhahill/Athea area near Foynes in Co Limerick when his flying column was attacked late at night by three lorry-loads of Black and Tans. Donnchadh Ó hAnnagáin, O/C of the West Limerick Flying Column, wrote an account of the battle. In this battle Tom Howard (who was later killed at an ambush at Lakelly) shot dead a Black and Tan who was about to shoot the dying Finn. The attack was witnessed by James Collins, later a TD.
