= Soloheadbeg =

Townland in County Tipperary, Ireland

Soloheadbeg Sulchóid Bheag
- Townland
- Location in Ireland
- Coordinates: 52°31′42″N 8°09′55″W
- Country: Ireland
- Province: Munster
- County: County Tipperary
- Dáil Éireann: Tipperary
- EU Parliament: South constituency
- Elevation: 97 m (318 ft)
- Irish Grid Reference: R888419

Sologheadbeg or Soloheadbeg (/ˌsɒləhədˈbɛɡ/; from Irish Sulchóid Bheag, IPA:[ˈsˠʊləxoːdʲˈvʲaɡ]) is a townland and civil parish in County Tipperary, Ireland, lying northwest of Tipperary town.

== History ==
In 968, Soloheadbeg was the location for the Battle of Sulcoit, where the Dalcassian King Mahon of Thomond and his brother Brian Ború defeated the viking Ivar, King of Limerick. In 1603, it was a stopping-point for Donal Cam O'Sullivan Beare during his epic march from Dunboy Castle in west Cork to O'Rourke's Castle in Leitrim.

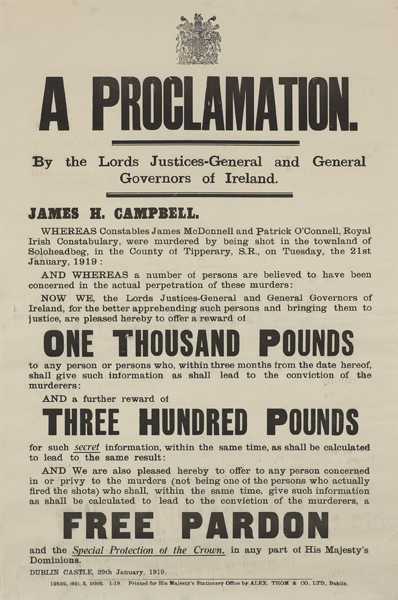
A proclamation offering a reward of 1000 pounds for information leading to the capture of those involved in the Soloheadbeg ambush

=== Soloheadbeg Ambush ===
The Soloheadbeg Ambush, said to be the first engagement of the Irish War of Independence, took place here on 21 January 1919. The event is commemorated by a monument at Solohead Cross, some 1.5 km northwest of Limerick Junction railway station, where a ceremony of remembrance is held each year on the anniversary of the ambush, which was led by Séumas Robinson, Seán Treacy, Dan Breen and Seán Hogan of the Third Tipperary Brigade. Details of the monument and photos can be found at Irish War Memorials Accounts of this ambush can be found in Ireland's Bureau of Military History where various 'Witness Statements' are kept. Members of the 'Old IRA' made these reports in exchange for Irish Army pensions following Independence from the UK. There are numerous references but Number WS1658 gives a starting point. On the day of the operation were four officers of the 3rd Tipperary Brigade IRA; Seán Treacy, Dan Breen, Seán Hogan (then only 17) and Séumas Robinson. They were joined by five other Volunteers: Tadhg Crowe, Mick McCormack, Paddy O'Dwyer (Hollyford), Michael Ryan (Donohill) and Seán O'Meara (Tipperary) — the latter two being cycle scouts. The monument has a wall with the eight surnames of Seán Treacy, Dan Breen, Seán Hogan, Séumas Robinson, Tadhg Crowe, Mick McCormack, Paddy O'Dwyer, Michael Ryan who were at the final site of the ambush that led to the deaths of two Royal Irish Constabulary members and the seizing of a cart of gelignite.

== Notable people ==
- Michael O'Dwyer the senior Indian civil servant was a native of the parish.
- Seán Treacy - 3rd Tipperary Brigade officer during the Irish War of Independence, died in a shoot-out with British soldiers in Talbot Street, Dublin in October 1920.
