= Knocklong =

Village in County Limerick, Ireland

Knocklong Irish: Cnoc Loinge
- Village
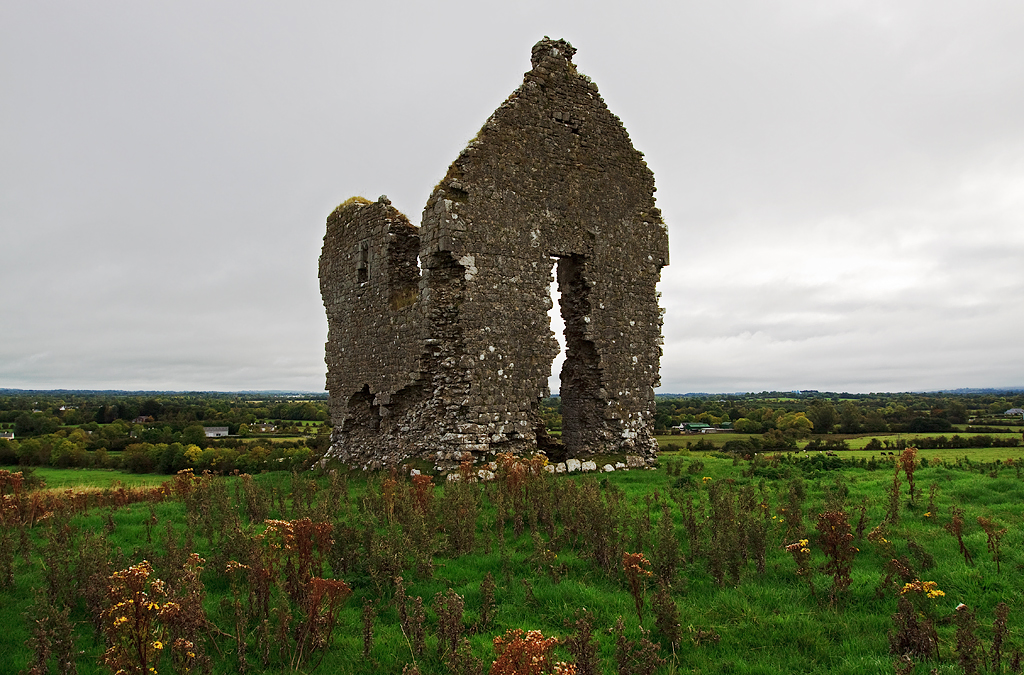
- O'Hurley Tower

- Location in Ireland
- Coordinates: 52°26′14″N 08°24′42″W
- Country: Ireland
- Province: Munster
- County: County Limerick

Population (2016)
  - Total: 256
- Time zone: UTC+0 (WET)
  - Summer (DST): UTC-1 (IST (WEST))

Knocklong (Irish: Cnoc Loinge) is a small village in County Limerick, Ireland. It is 29 km south-east of Limerick city, on the main Limerick to Mitchelstown to Cork road. The population was 256 at the 2016 census. The village is in a civil parish of the same name.

== History ==
Knocklong was originally known as Druim Damhghaire, the Ridge of the Oxen, but takes its present title from Cnoc Luinge, the Hill of the Encampment. According to tradition, King Cormac mac Airt set up his camp on this hill when he invaded Munster during the third century. The King of Munster consulted a Druid, Mug Ruith, who used his magical powers to help the Munster men to defeat Cormac's forces in a legendary battle said to have taken place about 250 A.D. Four centuries later, about 650, a more significant fight took place here when Dioma, King of Thomond, stopped the Connaught men from recovering County Clare from North Munster. This historic battle secured Clare for the Dalcassians so Cnoc Luinge may derive its present name from an encampment of the seventh century rather than the third century. Cnoc Luinge has also been translated as the Hill of the Ships, as the tents on the hill resembled ships under sail. Another version says that there was once a lake from Emly village in County Tipperary to the hill of Knocklong, on which small boats or ships used to sail.

Although it is a small village, Knocklong played a role in modern Irish history. It is most famous for the rescue of Seán Hogan which took place at the railway station in Knocklong during the War of Independence on 13 May 1919. Hogan's colleagues from the Third Tipperary Brigade -- Seán Treacy, Dan Breen and Séumas Robinson—were joined by Ned Foley, JJ O'Brien, Ned O'Brien, Seán Lynch, and Jim Scanlon from the East Limerick Brigade, to organise Hogan's rescue. Hogan was being transported by train to Cork, and the men, led by Treacy, boarded the train in Knocklong. A close-range shoot-out followed on the train. Treacy and Breen were seriously wounded in the gun fight, two policemen (Sergeant Peter Wallace and Constable Michael Enright) died, but Hogan was rescued. He was spirited away to Knocklong village, where his handcuffs were cleaved by Séan Lynch, one of the rescuers, in the local butcher's shop. That train station no longer exists. The rescue at Knocklong is commemorated in the song "The Station of Knocklong", which was a popular ballad during the Irish War of Independence. Ned Foley was later arrested and executed for his part in the rescue along with Patrick Maher, a volunteer from Limerick, who had no involvement in the Rescue at Knocklong. Both Maher and Foley were tried in a military court and hanged in Mountjoy Jail on 7 June 1921.

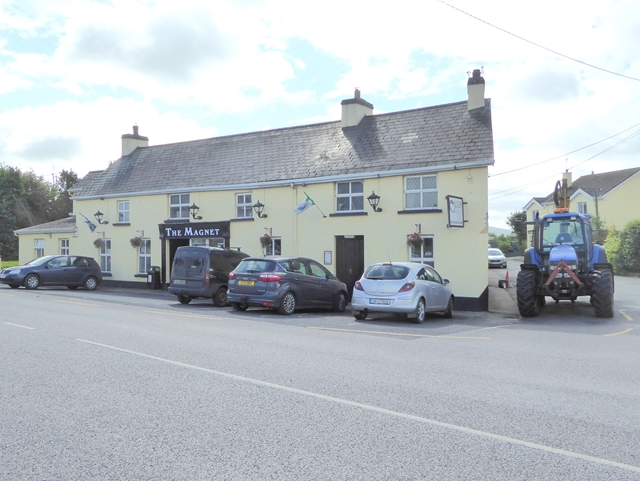
Pub in Knocklong

== Sport ==
Gaelic games (in particular hurling) are popular in the local community. A number of the village's residents have played with Garryspillane GAA club over the years. In 2005, the club won their first ever Limerick Senior Hurling Championship title and later went on to win the All-Ireland Kilmacud Crokes mini-7s tournament..

== Notable people ==
- William Coffey, recipient of the Victoria Cross
- Sir William Hurly, 3rd Baronet, Baronet (of Knocklong) 1684–1691
