= Donohill =

Village in County Tipperary, Ireland

Donohill Dún Eochaille
- Village
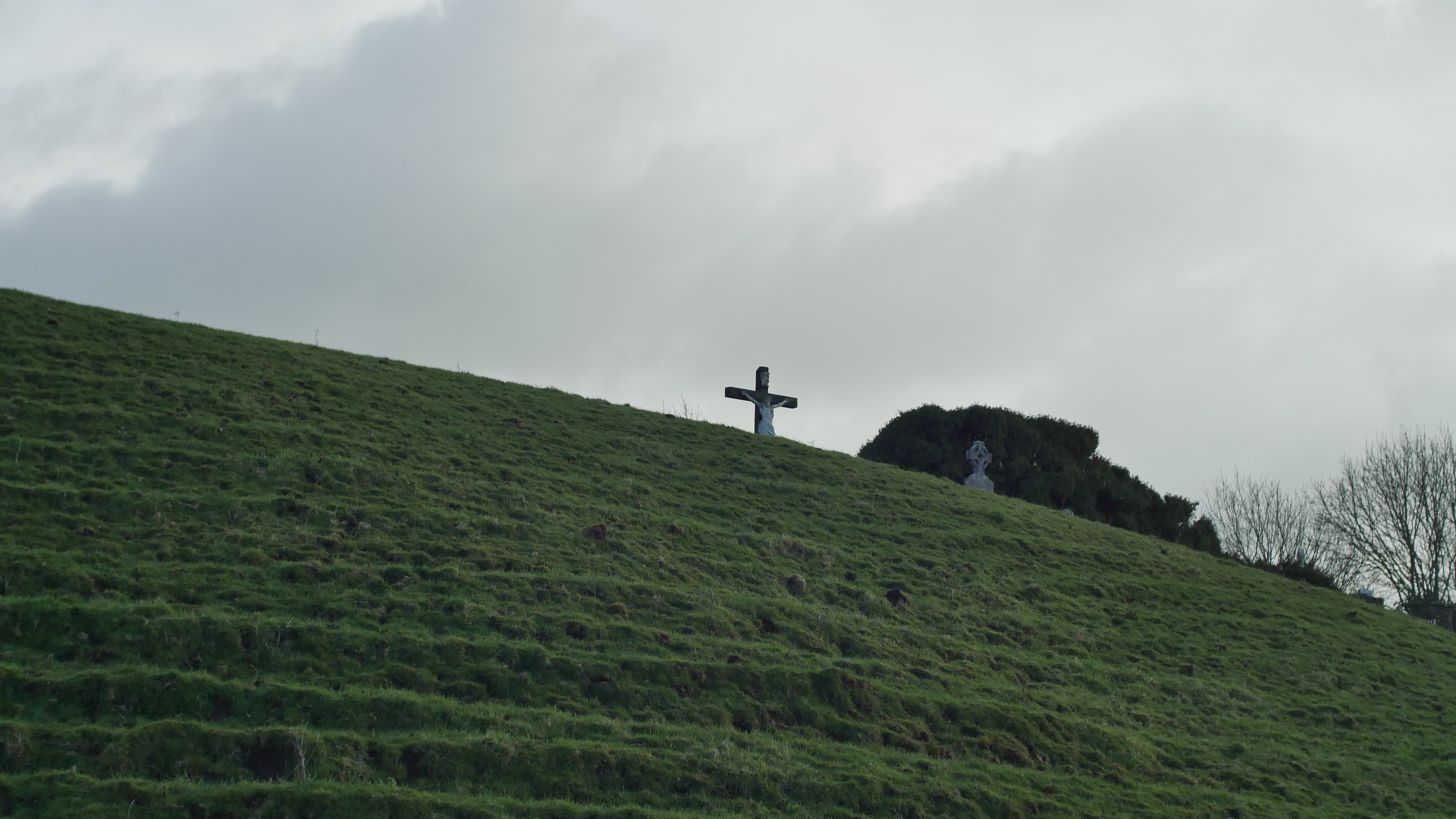
- Donohill Cemetery

- Location in Ireland
- Coordinates: 52°32′N 8°09′W
- Country: Ireland
- Province: Munster
- County: Tipperary
- Elevation: 95 m (312 ft)
- Time zone: UTC+0 (WET)
  - Summer (DST): UTC-1 (IST (WEST))

Donohill or Dunohil (Irish: Dún Eochaille) is a village and civil parish in County Tipperary, Ireland. The parish is one of nine civil parishes in the historical barony of Kilnamanagh Lower. The village is on the R497 regional road from Nenagh to Tipperary town, 7 kilometres north of Tipperary.

== History ==
According to the Topographical Dictionary of Ireland published by Samuel Lewis in 1837, the village had a population of 4308, today this has shrunk to almost one seventh of that to 631. There are ruins of an old church and houses near the village as well as Ballysheedy Castle which is located nearby.

== Geography ==
Donohill is located in west Tipperary.

The land area of the Donohill civil parish is 12,812 statute acres, or 51.8 square kilometres. The village is located in the heart of the Golden Vale, the greatest land for dairy farming.

== Demographics ==
The population of the village increased by 1.8% from 620 to 631, from 2002 to 2006.

== Sport ==
The local Gaelic club of Donohill is Éire Óg Annacarty GAA. The team has brought home West Tipperary Senior Hurling Championship title on 8 occasions.

== People ==
- Dan Breen – 3rd Tipperary Brigade officer during the Irish War of Independence, Fianna Fáil politician.
- Michael Patrick Ryan – Irish born politician, member of the 1st Canadian Parliament.
- Seán Hogan – 3rd Tipperary Brigade officer and Flying Column leader during the War of Independence.
