= Rescue at Knocklong =

Rescue operation carried out by the IRA

On 13 May 1919, a captured Irish Republican Army (IRA) member, Seán Hogan, was rescued from a train by his comrades while being guarded by four armed Royal Irish Constabulary (RIC) officers. Two of the RIC officers were killed and several IRA volunteers were wounded. The rescue took place on Hogan's 18th birthday, while the Cork-bound train stopped at Knocklong station in County Limerick. It was undertaken by three of Hogan's comrades from the 3rd Tipperary Brigade of the IRA and five members of the Galtee Battalion of the East Limerick Brigade. Hogan was one of the most wanted men in Ireland at the time of his rescue, due to his role in the Soloheadbeg ambush and would almost certainly have been executed.

The rescue was a great boost for Irish republican morale in the early stages of the Irish War of Independence and within weeks a number of popular ballads were being sung across Ireland regaling the events of the rescue.

== Background ==
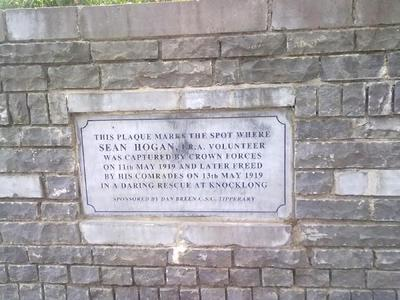
Plaque at spot where Seán Hogan was arrested Goldengrove near Bouladuff Thurles

Hogan was a wanted man after his participation in the Soloheadbeg Ambush earlier in the year. He was on the run with his comrades from the Third Tipperary Brigade, Séumas Robinson, Seán Treacy and Dan Breen, known as the "Big Four". These four men had spent much of the previous three months sleeping in the rough or in the houses of Republicans across Tipperary and Limerick, with a large reward on offer for their capture. Having spent the previous four nights with little sleep they attended a dance being held near Clonoulty, Tipperary. Hogan had gone on after the dance to Meagher's of Annfield, while his three comrades had earlier retired to a nearby house. Hogan fell asleep on a sofa in the kitchen but was awoken to cries that the 'peelers are raiding the house’. He leapt to his feet, grabbed his gun and ran out the back of the house, climbed over the back wall of the yard where he landed next to party of six RIC. He was wrestled to the ground and disarmed and taken to a nearby barracks before being transferred to Thurles barracks.

== Planning for the rescue ==
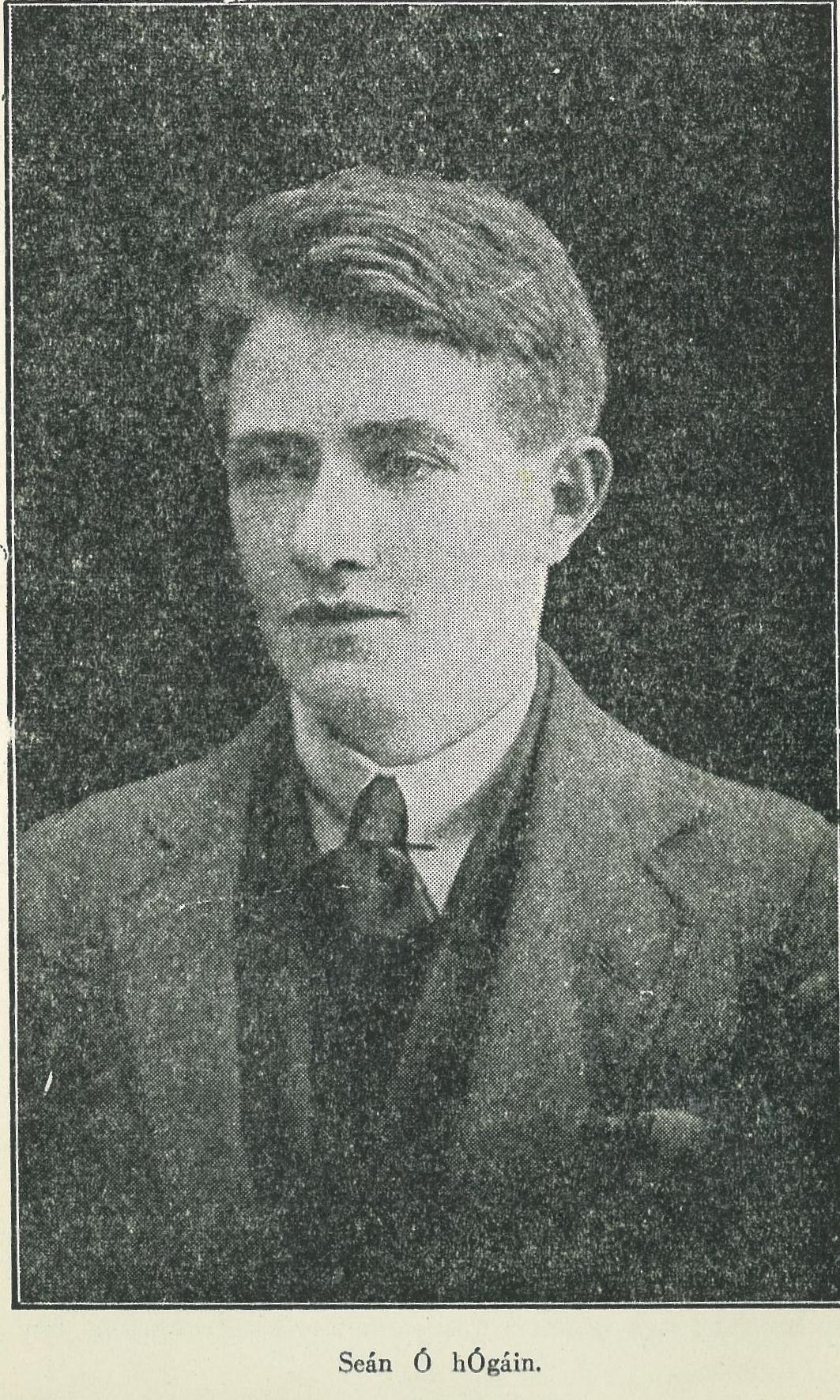
Seán Hogan 1919

After being informed of Hogan's capture by Patrick Kinnane of the 2nd Tipperary Brigade, the other members of the "Big Four"—Seán Treacy, Dan Breen and Séumas Robinson—immediately decided to try to rescue their young comrade before he was sent to one of the bigger prisons, where it would be impossible to rescue him. They first travelled to the Maloney homestead at Lackelly, a few miles from Emly and Knocklong railway stations. After a short discussion, Mai Maloney volunteered to go to Thurles to ascertain the whereabouts of Hogan. Having been assured that he was still in Thurles, she returned with the news to Robinson, Breen and Treacy. They decided to try to rescue Hogan from the train which was to take him to Cork prison.

They contacted the Tipperary Town Battalion to send reinforcements to help in the rescue. However, due to miscommunication, the reinforcements from Tipperary failed to arrive; at that stage help was sought from the Galtee Battalion of the East Limerick Brigade. Ned O'Brien, James Scanlon, JJ O'Brien, Seán Lynch and Ed Foley of Galbally promptly arrived at Emly Station. Another Volunteer, "Goorty" MacCarthy from Thurles, travelled on the train from Thurles to identify Hogan's carriage. While waiting for further news from Thurles the rescue plan was changed from Emly station to Knocklong station.

== The rescue ==
JJ O'Brien, Lynch, Scanlon and Foley went to Emly to await the train and when it arrived all four boarded the train with a view to ascertaining what compartment Hogan was in. When the train stopped at Knocklong they and Goorty MacCarthy signalled Hogan's position to Treacy and the others who were waiting on the platform. When the train pulled into Knocklong, Treacy and Ned O’Brien led the charge into the first carriage, where Hogan was being held in the custody of four armed officers from the RIC. Despite calls to surrender, Constable Enright put his gun to Hogan's head and was immediately shot dead by Ned O’Brien. Hogan leapt across the carriage and smashed his still handcuffed hands into Constable Ring's face. Ring was thrown through a nearby window by another volunteer, while Treacy and Sergeant Wallace engaged in a desperate hand-to-hand battle. Treacy eventually prevailed and Wallace lay mortally wounded, shot with the gun that he and Treacy had been grappling over. Treacy however was seriously wounded with a gunshot through the neck. Constable Reilly who earlier in the fight had been knocked down by Jim Scanlon and presumed unconscious, had managed to make his way to the platform unnoticed, as the fight between Wallace and Treacy continued. Still dazed, he opened fire on the train in an erratic manner, nearly hitting a number of passengers. He sent a volley of fire into the carriage where the fight was taking place, causing glass and shrapnel wounds to Scanlon, Ned O’Brien and Treacy. Dan Breen drew his fire on the platform taking a bullet in the lung before returning fire and causing Reilly to depart the scene. Hogan was led to the nearby butcher's shop by Seán Lynch where David O'Byrne, the local butcher, split open the handcuffs with a meat cleaver.

== Aftermath ==
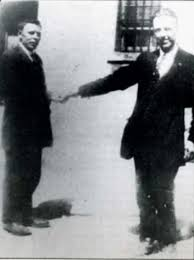
Maher and Foley in Mountjoy Jail Dublin in 1921

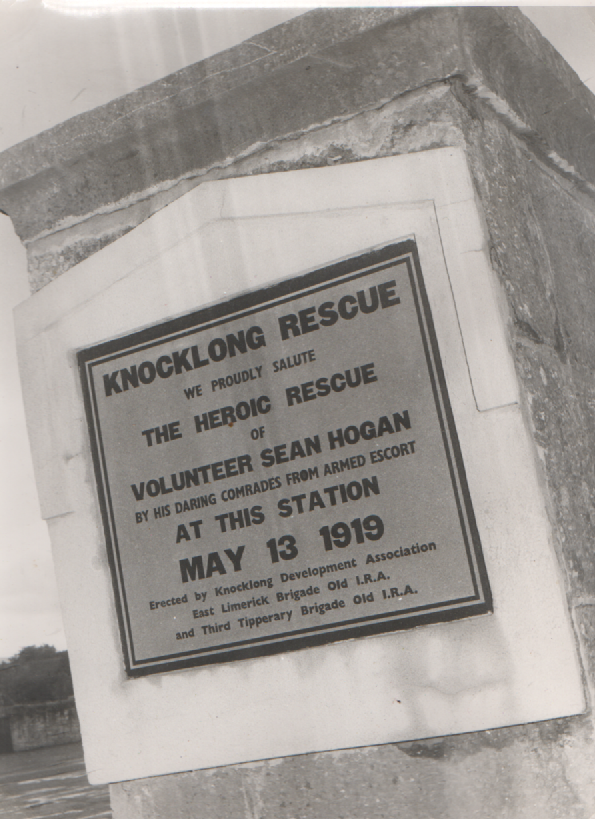
Rescue at Knocklong old plaque

The wounded volunteers were taken to Shanahan's of the Hill at Glenlora, Dr. William Hennessy and Dr. Fitzgerald attended the wounded. The Big Four were quickly moved to West Limerick as large numbers of RIC and military reinforcements were put in place in all nearby barracks and search parties were scouring all the local areas around Knocklong for the wounded volunteers. In the weeks after the incident, intensive police and army activity led to the arrest of many suspects, but they failed to capture any of the actual rescue party. At an inquest held in Kilmallock Courthouse, Inspector McLean instructed the RIC witnesses not to answer jurors' questions but to portray the deaths of Wallace and Enright as cold-blooded murder. A juror responded to Police claims by boldly stating, "You are simply trying to paint your own story in your own way." The jury not only failed to bring a verdict of murder but blamed the Government for exposing the RIC to danger and condemned "the arrest of respectable persons and the exasperating of the people."

Hogan, Breen, Treacy and Robinson later travelled to Dublin where they participated with Dublin volunteers in a number of attacks on the British in the early part of the war. Robinson and Hogan returned to Tipperary to continue the fight with the 3rd Tipperary Brigade, Robinson in his role as Brigade O/C and Hogan initially as a Brigade Officer and then as O/C of the Brigade's second flying column. Treacy and Breen alternated between Dublin and Tipperary throughout the war. Treacy was killed in action in Dublin in October 1920. JJ O’Brien and Seán Lynch went on the run and spent some time fighting with Dinny Lacey's flying column in the 3rd Tipperary Brigade, before returning to the East Limerick Brigade. After a period on the run Ned O'Brien and Jim Scanlon met up with the Big four in Dublin before slipping out of Ireland to America, where they participated in activities to raise funds and support for the fight in Ireland.

In September 1919, Ed Foley and Patrick Maher (who had no part in the rescue), were arrested and after two civilian trials they were tried a third time in a military trial and found guilty. They were executed by hanging in The Mountjoy Prison on 7 June 1921, despite the best efforts of many people who looked for clemency including Sergeant Wallace's father. Foley and Maher were part of the Forgotten Ten, that were buried within the Mountjoy prison precincts, where they remained for eighty years. After years of campaigning the bodies of the forgotten ten were removed from the prison grounds. They received state funerals on 14 October 2001. Maher was buried at Ballylanders, Co. Limerick while Foley was buried at Glasnevin Cemetery, Dublin.
