= Dinny Lacey =

Irish Revolutionary (1889–1923)

- Born: Denis Lacey; 31 May 1889; Attybrick, County Tipperary, Ireland
- Died: 18 February 1923 (aged 33); Glen of Aherlow, County Tipperary, Ireland
- Military career
- Branch: Irish Volunteers; Irish Republican Brotherhood; Irish Republican Army; Anti-Treaty IRA
- Units: Flying Column commander 3rd Tipperary Brigade, IRA
- Conflicts: Irish War of Independence; Irish Civil War

Denis Lacey (31 May 1889 – 18 February 1923) was an Irish Republican Army officer during the Irish War of Independence and anti-Treaty IRA officer during the Irish Civil War.

== Early life and Irish War of Independence ==
Lacey was born in 1889 in a village called Attybrick, near Annacarty, County Tipperary. His parents were Thomas Lacy and Ellen Hayes. He worked as a clerk and manager of a coal merchant in Tipperary Town, prior to the Irish War of Independence. He was deeply religious and a strict non-smoker and non-drinker.

He joined the Irish Volunteers in 1913 and was sworn into the secretive Irish Republican Brotherhood in 1914. He was introduced to the IRB by Seán Treacy. During the War of Independence (1919–1921) he was selected to command an IRA flying column of the 3rd Tipperary Brigade, in September 1920. The flying column mounted two successful ambushes of British forces - killing six British soldiers at Thomastown near Golden, and four Royal Irish Constabulary men at Lisnagaul in the Glen of Aherlow.

In April 1921, following another ambush of British troops near Clogheen, he captured RIC inspector Gilbert Potter, whom he later executed in reprisal of the British hanging of republican prisoners.

== Civil War and Death ==
In December 1921, his unit split over the Anglo-Irish Treaty. Lacey strongly opposed the Treaty and most of his men followed suit. Lacey took over commanded of the Third Tipperary Brigade as Séumas Robinson was appointed to command the anti-Treaty IRA's Second Southern Division. Just prior to the start of the Civil War (February 1922) Lacey led a successful raid on the barracks at Clonmel in which hundreds of rifles, 200,000 rounds of ammunition, bombs, and multiple armoured cars were seized by the republicans. In the ensuing civil war (June 1922-May 1923), he organised guerrilla activity in the Tipperary area against Irish Free State (pro-Treaty) forces.

He was killed in an action against Free State troops at Ballydavid, near Bansha in the Glen of Aherlow on 18 February 1923, alongside Edmund Quirke aged 10 years old. Denis Lacey was 33 years old. Over 1,000 Free State troops, under the command of General John T. Prout, with the intention of breaking up his guerrilla unit, converged on the Glen where he and four other men from his column were billeted. Lacey and one of his men were killed and others captured. Two National Army soldiers were killed in the action.

Dinny's brother Joe Lacey (also a member of the IRA) died on 24 December 1923 in the Curragh Camp hospital from his weakened condition caused by his participation in the 1923 Irish Hunger Strikes which had ended a month earlier. Joe Lacey died ten months after the death of his brother Dinny.

A memorial in Annacarty commemorates Dinny Lacey's war service and subsequent death in action.

"It was England gave the orders and England gave the guns and Cosgrave dyed the khaki green to kill our gallant sons they spilt their blood upon the grass and thought it no disgrace when they murdered Dinny Lacey the noblest of our race."

Dinny Lacey is buried at St. Michaels cemetery in his native County Tipperary.

== In popular culture ==
Lacey is mentioned in the Irish folk ballad "The Galtee Mountain Boy", along with Seán Moylan, Dan Breen, and Seán Hogan. The song, written by Patsy Halloran, recalls some of the travels of a "Flying column" from Tipperary as they fought during the Irish War of Independence, and later against the pro-Treaty side during the Irish Civil War.

Lacey is also mentioned in the Irish rebel song "Soldiers Of '22", along with Cathal Brugha, Liam Lynch Neil Plunkett Boyle and Pádraig Ó Cuinn. The song, written by Brian O'Higgins, to the tune of The Foggy Dew, recalls Lacey's death in the Glen of Aherlow.

The fourth verse of the song Rifles of the I.R.A. (song) refers to Lacey, amongst other republican figures Tom Barry and Seán Treacy as commanding a crew executing a group of Black and Tans.

== See also ==
- 3rd Tipperary Brigade
- Irish War of Independence
- Irish Civil War

== Sources ==
- "An Phoblacht/Republican News". Republican-news.org.
- "Phoenix Publishing". Homepage.eircom.net.
- Third Brigade Tipperary Memorial Thirdtippbrigade.ie Retrieved June 14, 2018
