= The Galtee Mountain Boy =

Irish folk song

"The Galtee Mountain Boy" is an Irish folk ballad, originally written by Patsy O'Halloran. Christy Moore added a fourth verse to O'Halloran's original three; this is the version that is most commonly performed.

The song is a monologue, documenting the narrator's enlistment and travels with one of Tipperary's flying columns, from Cork, through Tipperary and Wicklow, to Dublin. Although not lyrically mentioned in the song the proximity of the Galtee mountains with neighbouring Limerick in which it splits between the two gives due mentioning of the east & west Limerick Galtee battalions who fought jointly with Sean Hogan throughout the War of Independence, the lyrics include farewells to both Tipperary and the town of Clonmel.

It references historical figures from the Irish War of Independence and subsequent Irish Civil War, including Seán Moylan, Dan Breen, Dinny Lacey, and Seán Hogan. It portrays the Free State forces as enemies, suggesting that the narrator was fighting in opposition to the Anglo-Irish Treaty of 1921.

The narrator is not believed to be any specific historical figure rather to be representative of those who fought in the flying columns in the War of Independence and on the Republican side in the Civil War. However, a number of people claim that the Galtee Mountain Boy is a specific individual, some believe this to be Patrick Davern from Tipperary.

== Recordings ==
It has been recorded by Christy Moore, Paddy Reilly, the Wolfe Tones, Derek Warfield and the Young Wolftones, and Patrick Clifford. It was famously sung by Pat Kerwick at Croke Park after Tipperary won the All Ireland Hurling final in 2010.

== See also ==
- List of Irish ballads
