= Seán Hogan =

Irish Republican Army officer (1901–1968)

- Seán Ó hÓgáin
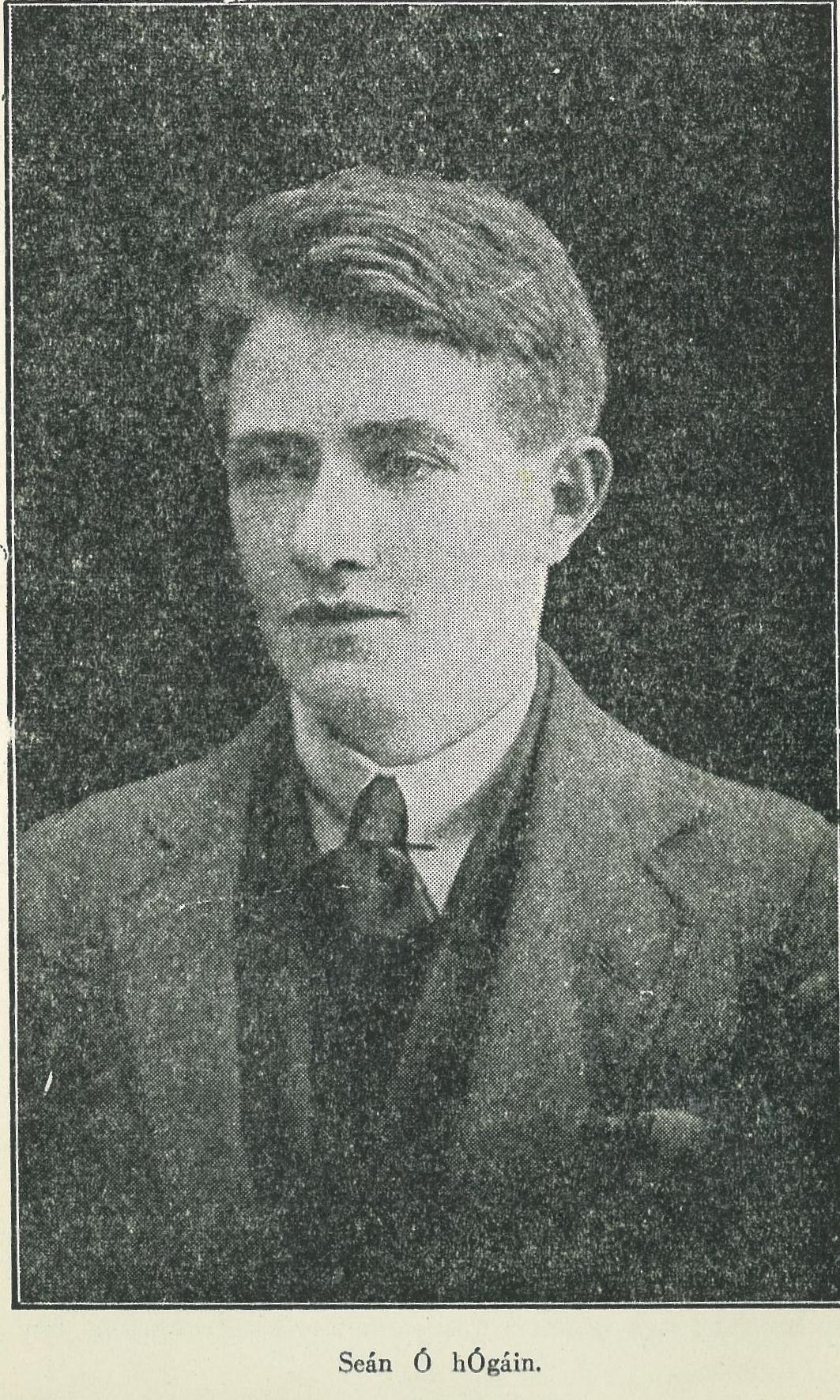
- Hogan, 1919
- Born: 13 May 1901; County Tipperary
- Died: 24 December 1968 (aged 67); Dublin
- Burial place: St. Michael's Cemetery, Tipperary
- Spouse: Christina Butler (m. 1925)
- Children: 3
- Military career
- Allegiance: Irish Republic
- Unit: 3rd Tipperary Brigade
- Conflicts: Irish War of Independence; Irish Civil War

John Joseph Hogan (Irish: Seán Ó hÓgáin; 13 May 1901 – 24 December 1968) was one of the leaders of the 3rd Tipperary Brigade of the Irish Republican Army during the War of Independence.

== Early life ==
Hogan was born on 13 May 1901 and baptised as John Joseph. He was the elder child of Matthew Hogan of Greenane, Kilmucklin, County Tipperary, and Johanna Corbett, and had one younger brother, Matthew. The 1911 census shows Hogan living in Stockaun, adjacent to Greenane in south-west Tipperary, 2–3 miles north of Tipperary Town. He attended the local national school and was taught Irish language and history by Cormac Breathnach who also taught other local students who would become prominent in the nationalist movement, including Seán Treacy, Dan Breen and Dinny Lacey.

Hogan joined the local Volunteers and was a member of the Donohill company of the Tipperary Third Brigade. In early 1918 he was assigned to work with Breen. After Treacy's release from jail in mid 1918, Hogan arranged for the use of a shed on his cousin's dairy farm in Greenane which Treacy, Breen and Hogan used as their base for planning future activity and testing explosives. The shed was commonly referred to as the "Tin Hut".

== War of Independence ==
=== Soloheadbeg ===
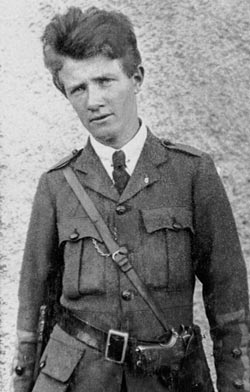
Seán Hogan c. 1921

On 21 January 1919, Breen, Treacy, Séumas Robinson, Hogan, Tadhg Crowe, Patrick McCormack, Patrick O'Dwyer and Michael Ryan helped to ignite the conflict that was to become the Irish War of Independence. They shot dead two members of the Royal Irish Constabulary (RIC) – Constables McDonnell and O’Connell – during the ambush in County Tipperary. The RIC men were transporting gelignite explosives, and when they were called on to surrender they took up firing positions but were shot dead by the ambush party. As a result of the action, South Tipperary was placed under martial law and declared a Special Military Area under the Defence of the Realm Act. Treacy, Breen and Hogan took the cart, hid the explosives and immediately 'went on the run'. They met up again with Robinson a few weeks later, and "the big four", as they were referred to in Ireland at the time, remained in hiding over the following months, moving between the houses of sympathisers or sleeping rough in the countryside.

A large police and military manhunt was launched to find them. A thousand-pound reward was offered for information leading to their capture; this was later raised to ten thousand pounds. The Police Gazette, 'The Hue and Cry' regularly published accurate descriptions of the wanted men. The houses of known or suspected nationalists were ransacked by the RIC. Relatives and friends of the men on the run were a particular target. "By February, 1919, the R.I.C. were very bitter because none of us had been captured and I got reports of torture to civilians, including Hogan's and Breen's relatives."

Hogan's younger brother Matthew, aged 15, was imprisoned with his school friend John Connors and his brother Tim Connors (aged 11) whose father worked on Treacy's mother's farm. They were held for three months without trial, on the suspicion that they knew where Hogan and the others were. Hogan's mother was also imprisoned for a period in an attempt to extract information.

Treacy and Robinson travelled to Dublin and met with Michael Collins who offered to arrange for them and Breen and Hogan to escape to America. They rejected the offer and told Collins they would remain in Ireland and continue the fight.

=== Knocklong ===
Hogan was arrested on 12 May 1919 by the RIC after attending a dance near Clonoulty, Tipperary. His three comrades (Breen, Treacy and Robinson) were joined by five men from the East Limerick Brigade (Ned and JJ O'Brien, Seán Lynch, Ed Foley and James Scanlon) in order to organise Hogan's rescue. He was being transported by train to Cork on 13 May 1919, when the men, led by Treacy, boarded the train in Knocklong. A close-range shoot-out followed on the train. Treacy and Breen were seriously wounded in the gun fight and two policemen died, but Hogan was rescued. He was taken to Knocklong village, where his handcuffs were cut by the local butcher. The rescue boosted Republican morale in the early stage of the war; within weeks a number of ballads about the rescue were being sung across Ireland. There was an extensive police and military search for the participants of the rescue. The four men were quickly moved to West Limerick, where Treacy and Breen recuperated in the houses of members and friends of the West Limerick Brigade. They also spent time in Clare and Cork before relocating to Dublin in the middle of 1919. Two IRA prisoners, Ed Foley (one of the rescuers) and Patrick Maher (who had no part in the rescue), were later convicted by courts-martial and executed by the British in Mountjoy jail.

=== Dublin ===
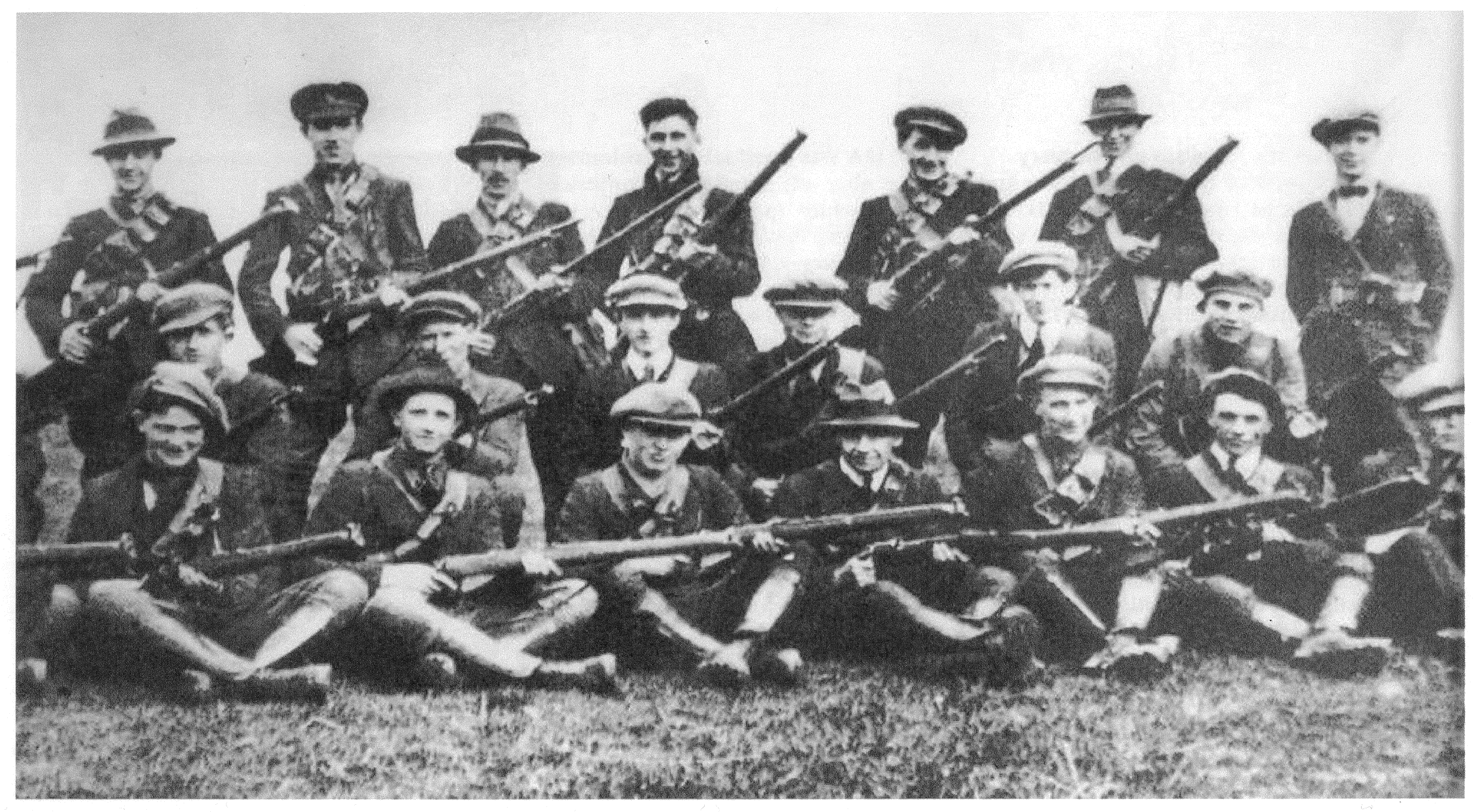
Seán Hogan's IRA Flying Column during the Irish War of Independence.

The four Tipperary men undertook a range of missions under the direction of the Dublin leadership; some of these missions were in association with a unit known as The Squad. Plans were made and ambush positions taken for a number of attacks on Lord French, the Viceroy of Ireland who also served as Commander-in-Chief, Ireland, in the second half of 1919. However, the intelligence received about French's movements was inaccurate, and no attack took place until the ambush at Ashtown Road. In one of these planned ambush attempts Hogan waited on Grattan Bridge for French's car to pass, at which time he would pull the pins from his grenade. French's car failed to turn up as expected, and Hogan had to hold down the firing mechanism of the grenade for over an hour until he reached a safe house and new pins could be placed in the grenades.

In December 1919 Hogan, Treacy, Breen, Robinson, Martin Savage and a number of Dublin volunteers under the leadership of Paddy Daly undertook an ambush on Lord French's motorcade of three cars at Ashtown Road in Dublin. Three of French's party, two RIC men and a driver, were wounded, but French was unharmed; Martin Savage was killed and Breen wounded. Hogan remained primarily based in Dublin until early 1920, although he made several trips to Tipperary to attend Brigade meetings and participate in a number of the raids on RIC barracks there.

=== West Limerick ===
In the spring of 1920, Hogan made two trips to west Limerick. On one visit he joined members of the West Limerick Brigade in activities including the attack led by the brigade OC Sean Finn in Rathkeale on the Hibernian Hotel in which Sergeant Neazor of the RIC was killed and a constable wounded. Later Hogan came from Dublin with Finn to help identify a spy. Operating in the west Limerick area under the assumed name of Peadar Clancy of Dublin GHQ, the spy stated that he was a friend of Hogan, Breen and Treacy. Several members of the West Limerick Brigade became suspicious and when he moved to Kerry they sent word to monitor him. He was arrested in Kerry and brought back to Limerick for trial. Hogan knew the real Peadar Clancy, who was executed later in the year by the British in Dublin Castle. It was discovered that the person's real name was John Crowley who had been on the trail of Hogan, Treacy and Breen. Crowley was identified by Hogan and executed by the West Limerick Brigade as a spy.

=== Back in Tipperary ===
Hogan returned full-time to Tipperary in the middle of 1920, initially serving as a brigade officer. He was tasked with reorganising the activities of 6th and 7th battalions and was made interim O/C of the 6th Battalion, as the previous commander had been imprisoned. In September 1920, Hogan and Treacy travelled to Dublin for a meeting with GHQ on the formation of Flying Columns. Hogan returned to Tipperary, but Treacy remained in Dublin and was killed in action the following month. In December 1920, Hogan was made O/C of the Brigade's 2nd Flying Column. Jack Nagle was his deputy and Maurice McGrath the adjutant. Dan Breen, who was recuperating from the wounds he received at Drumconda, stayed with the column for a number of weeks while it was being established and assisted Hogan with its formation and training. The column became active in January 1921 and operated mainly in the southern part of the Brigade area. It also undertook activities in Kilkenny and North Cork.

== Truce and Civil War ==
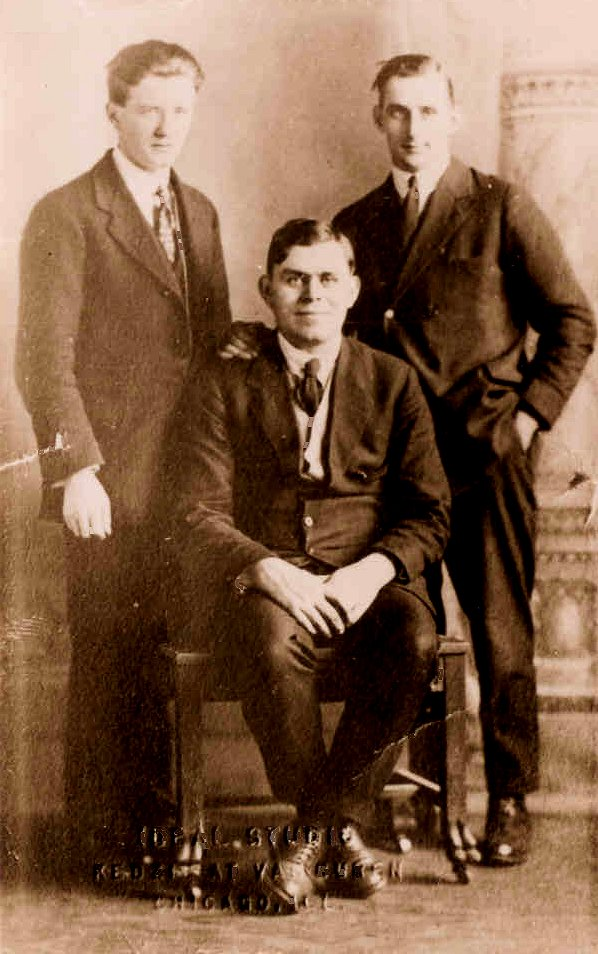
Seán Hogan, Dan Breen (seated) & Ned O'Brien in Chicago, US

During the early part of the truce period Hogan was based mainly in Dublin, although he travelled to the North of the country to assist with the training of brigades, including assisting at an IRA training camp at Sperrin, County Tyrone with Dan Breen. In December 1921, disheartened by the terms of the treaty, he travelled to the USA with Breen. In March 1922 republican leader Liam Lynch requested they return to Ireland as tensions between supporters and opponents of the treaty were rising. Breen and Hogan arrived back in Ireland in April 1922.

After the fall of the Four Courts and Dublin to the Free State army at the start of the Irish Civil War, Hogan returned to the East Limerick/South Tipperary area. He was later captured by Free State troops in Limerick and interned in Mountjoy jail in Dublin.

=== Post-war life ===
After the war Hogan returned to farming in Tipperary; he later tried farming in County Dublin but this venture did not succeed. He also worked for the Board of Works and as an usher in the Dáil. He married Christina Butler, a nurse and Cumann na mBan member, on 24 February 1925 at Our Lady of Refuge church in Rathmines Dublin. His brother Matthew was best man and the bride's sister, Alice, was bridesmaid. The couple had three sons, Hugh, Thomas and Seán, but later separated.

The revolutionary years had taken a toll on Hogan's mental and physical health and in later years he was in poor circumstances, living on his own in North Great George's Street, Dublin. He stayed with Séumas Robinson and his family in their house on Highfield Road for six months. Hogan died aged sixty-seven on Christmas Eve, 1968. He was buried with full military honours in the family grave at St. Michael's Cemetery, Tipperary town.

== In popular culture ==
Hogan is mentioned in the Irish folk ballad "The Galtee Mountain Boy", along with Seán Moylan, Dinny Lacey and Dan Breen. The song, written by Patsy Halloran, recalls some of the travels of a "Flying column" from Tipperary as they fought during the Irish War of Independence, and later against the pro-Treaty side during the Irish Civil War.

A song about Hogan's rescue at Knocklong was recorded by Irish folk singer Johnny Donegan and Limerick band Clover.

A biography of Hogan titled Seán Hogan His Life: A Troubled Journey, written by Tipperary historian John Connors, was published in 2019.

In 2022, Tom Hennessy published Seán Hogan's Flying Column, an examination of the first march under arms of the 3rd Tipperary Brigade and the local families who aided them.
