= Seán Treacy =

Irish republican (1895–1920)

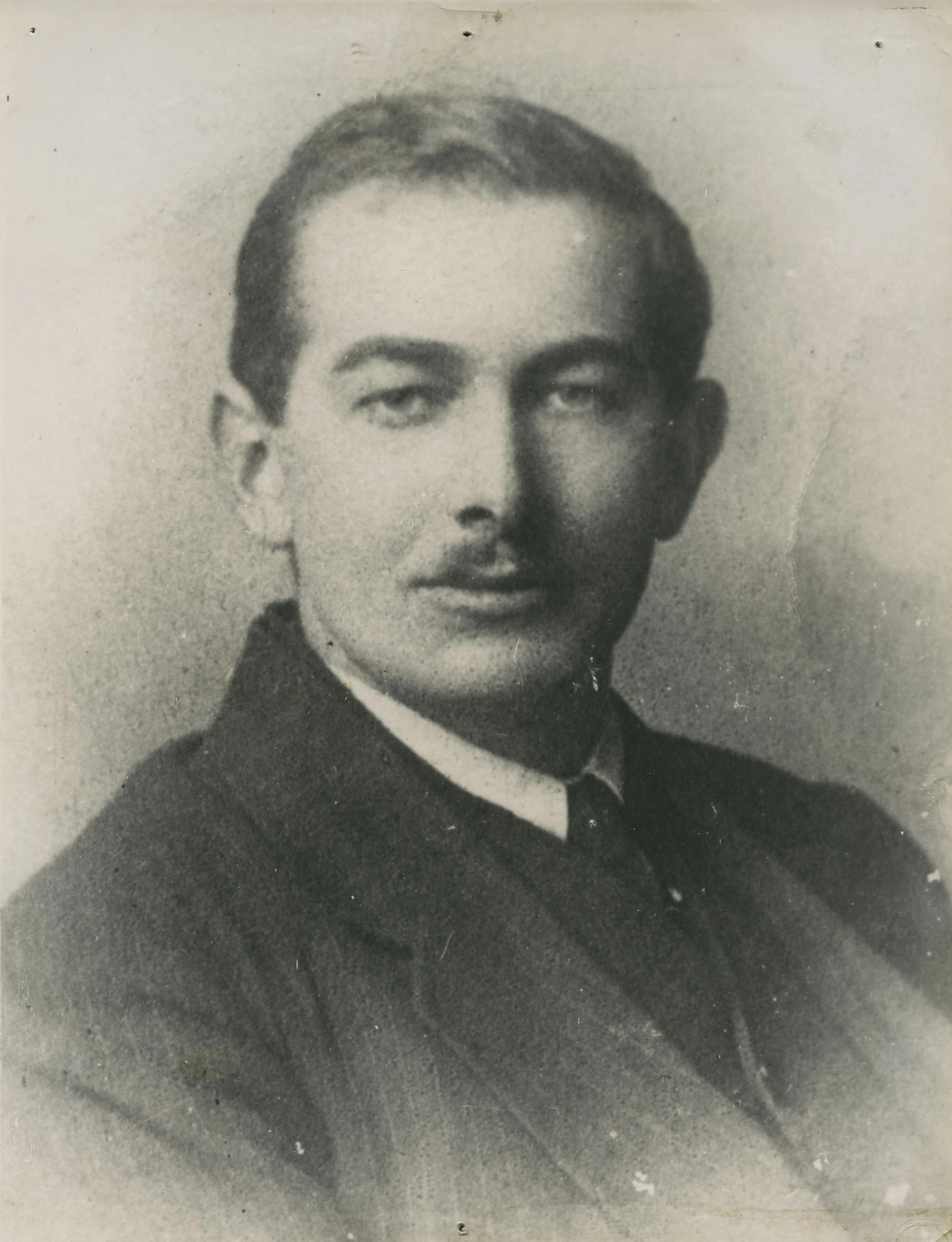
- Treacy c. 1919
- Born: John Allis Treacy; 14 February 1895; Soloheadbeg, County Tipperary, Ireland.
- Died: 14 October 1920 (aged 25); Talbot Street, Dublin
- Burial place: Kilfeacle, County Tipperary
- Other name: Seán Ó Treasaigh (Irish)
- Occupation: Farmer
- Known for: IRA activities

Seán Treacy (Irish: Seán Ó Treasaigh; né John Allis Treacy; 14 February 1895 – 14 October 1920) was an Irish republican and one of the leaders of the Third Tipperary Brigade of the IRA during the Irish War of Independence. He was one of a small group whose actions initiated that conflict in 1919. Treacy was killed in October 1920, in Talbot Street, Dublin, in a shootout with British troops during a British Secret Service surveillance operation.

== Early life and Irish Republicanism ==
Born John Allis Treacy, he came from a small-farming background in Soloheadbeg in west Tipperary and grew up in Hollyford. He was the son of farmer Denis Treacy and Bridget née Allis) Treacy. His surname, although sometimes mistranscribed as Tracey, as inscribed on the commemorative plaque in Talbot Street, or even Tracy, is more properly spelled Treacy. Referring to Treacy, Tim Pat Coogan uses this form in his book The IRA. Treacy's father died when his son was three and the family went to live with his uncle, Jim Allis, in Lackenacreena, Hollyford, where he was educated at the local Hollyford National School and later at the Christian Brothers School in Tipperary town. Treacy left school at the age of 14 and worked as a farmer and developed deep patriotic convictions. Locally, he was seen as a promising farmer, as he was calm, direct, intelligent, and ready to experiment with new methods. He was a member of the Gaelic League, of the Irish Republican Brotherhood (IRB) from 1911, and of the Irish Volunteers from 1913.

He was picked up in the mass arrests in the aftermath of the Easter Rising in 1916 and spent much of the following two years in prisons (Cork Prison, Dundalk Gaol and Mountjoy Prison), where he joined an ongoing hunger strike (22 September 1917). Treacy was released from Mountjoy in June 1918. From Dundalk jail in 1918, he wrote to his comrades in Tipperary: "Deport all in favour of the enemy out of the country. Deal sternly with those who try to resist. Maintain the strictest discipline, there must be no running to kiss mothers goodbye." In 1918, he was appointed Vice Officer-Commandant of the 3rd Tipperary Brigade of the Irish Volunteers (which became the Irish Republican Army in 1919).

== Soloheadbeg ambush ==
On 21 January 1919, Treacy and Dan Breen, together with Seán Hogan, Séumas Robinson (known as the 'big four') and five other volunteers, helped to ignite the conflict that was to become the Irish War of Independence. They ambushed and shot dead two members of the Royal Irish Constabulary (RIC) – Constables Patrick O'Connell and James McDonnell – during the Soloheadbeg ambush near Treacy's home. Treacy led the planning for the ambush and briefed the brigade's O/C Robinson on his return from prison in late 1918. Robinson supported the plans and agreed they wouldn't go to GHQ for permission to undertake the attack. The RIC men were guarding a transport of gelignite explosives.

Breen later recalled:

...we took the action deliberately, having thought over the matter and talked it over between us. Treacy had stated to me that the only way of starting a war was to kill someone, and we wanted to start a war, so we intended to kill some of the police, whom we looked upon as the foremost and most important branch of the enemy forces... The only regret that we had following the ambush was that there were only two policemen in it, instead of the six we had expected...

== Knocklong train rescue ==
As a result of the action, South Tipperary was placed under martial law and declared a Special Military Area under the Defence of the Realm Act. After another member of the Soloheadbeg ambush party, Seán Hogan, who was just 17, was arrested on 12 May 1919, the three others (Treacy, Breen and Robinson) were joined by five men from the IRA's East Limerick Brigade to organise Hogan's rescue. Hogan was brought to the train which was intended to bring him from Thurles to Cork city on 13 May 1919 – his escort grinning at him as he told the ticketmaster: "Give me three tickets to Cork – and two returns." As the train steamed across the Tipperary border and into Co Limerick the IRA party, led by Treacy, boarded it at Knocklong. A close-range struggle ensued on the train. Treacy and Breen were seriously wounded in the gunfight. Two RIC men died, but Hogan was rescued. His rescuers rushed him into the village of Knocklong, where a butcher's wife slammed down the shutters to hide them and her husband cut off Hogan's handcuffs using a cleaver.

== Dublin and the Squad ==
A search for Treacy and others was mounted across Ireland. Treacy left Tipperary for Dublin to avoid capture. Michael Collins employed him on assassination operations with "the Squad". He was involved in the attempted assassination of the Lord Lieutenant of Ireland, Sir John French, in December 1919.

In the summer of 1920, Treacy returned to Tipperary and organised several attacks on RIC barracks, notably at Hollyford, Kilmallock and Drangan, before again moving his base of operations to Dublin.

By spring 1920 the political police of the Crimes Special Branch and G-Division (Special Branch) of the Dublin Metropolitan Police (DMP) had been effectively neutralised by IRA counterintelligence operatives under Collins. The British thoroughly reorganised their administration at Dublin Castle, including the appointment of Colonel Ormonde Winter as chief of a new Combined Intelligence Service (CIS) for Ireland. Working closely with Sir Basil Thomson, Director of Civil Intelligence in the British Home Office, with Colonel Hill Dillon, Chief of British Military Intelligence in Ireland, and with the local British Secret Service Head of Station, "Count Sevigné" at Dublin Castle,

Winter began to import dozens of professional secret service agents from all parts of the British Empire into Ireland to track down IRA volunteers and Sinn Féin leaders. Treacy and Breen were again relocated to Dublin, in the "Squad". Its mission was to discover and assassinate British secret agents, political policemen and their informants, and to carry out other special missions for GHQ. With help from police inspectors brought up to Dublin from Tipperary, CIS spotted Treacy and Breen and placed them under surveillance.

== Death ==
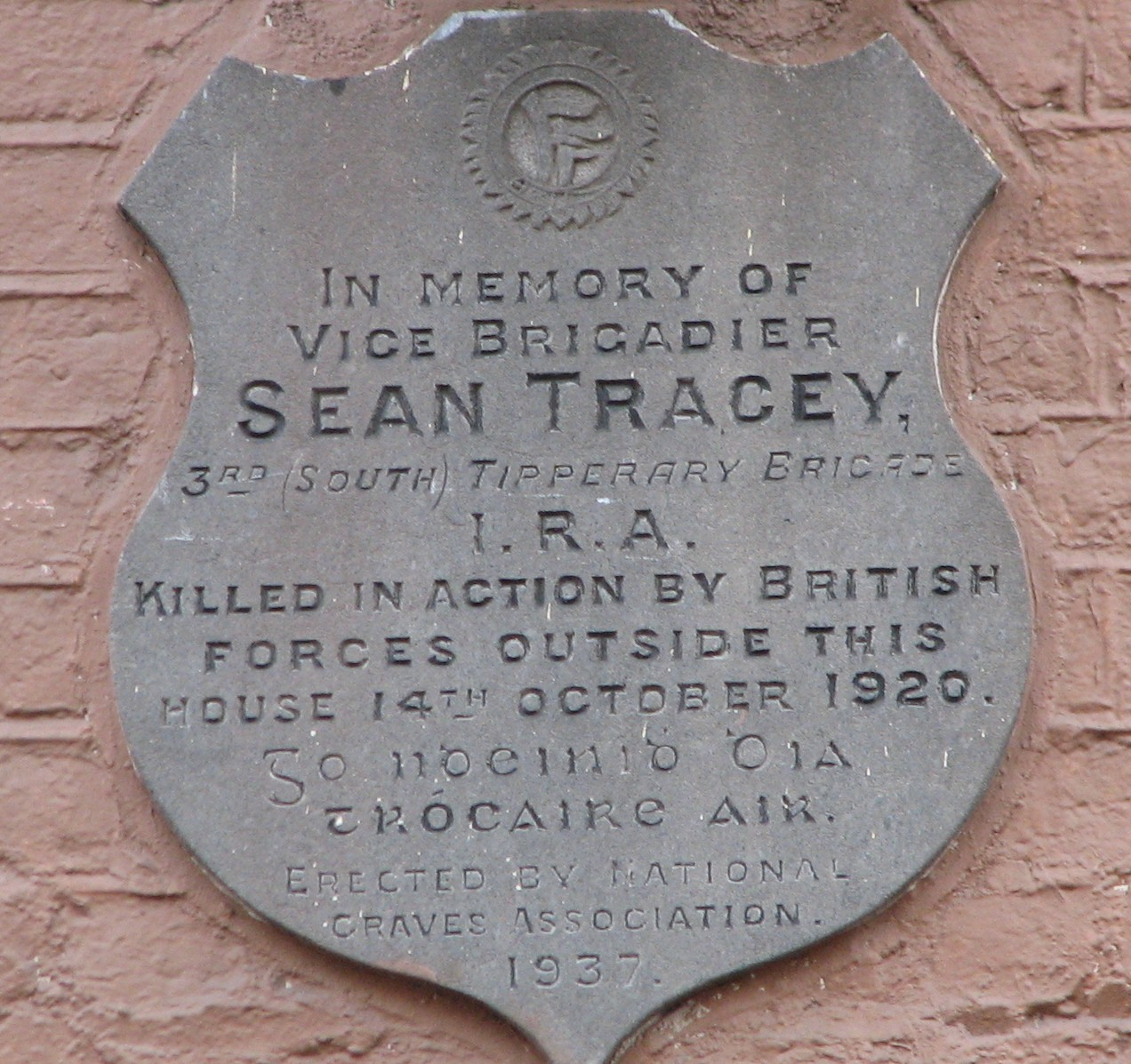
Seán Tracey (sic) Commemorative plaque in Dublin's Talbot Street

On 11 October 1920, Treacy and Breen were holed up in a safe house owned by Professor of Education and IRA sympathiser named John Carolan – Fernside – in Drumcondra on the north side of Dublin city when it was raided by a police unit, led there by an informer, Robert Pike. In the ensuing shootout, two Royal Field Artillery officers, Major George Osbert Stirling Smyth and Captain Alfred Philip White, were mortally wounded and died the next day, while Breen was seriously wounded. Professor Carolan, who worked at the nearby St Patrick's Teacher Training College, was shot in the neck and died on 28 October 1920 as a result of the bullet wound. Treacy and Breen escaped through a high window and shot their way through the police cordon. The injured Breen was spirited away to Dublin's Mater Hospital where he was admitted using a false name. Treacy had been wounded but not seriously. As the British searched for them, Collins ordered the Squad to guard them while plans were laid for Treacy to be exfiltrated from the Dublin metropolitan area to Tipperary. Realising that the major thoroughfares would be under surveillance, Treacy bought a bicycle with the intention of cycling home by back roads. When Collins learned that a public funeral for the two officers killed at Fernside was to take place on 14 October, he ordered the Squad to set up along the procession route and to take out two powerful men, the Chief Secretary for Ireland Hamar Greenwood and Lieutenant-General Henry Hugh Tudor, who had established the Black and Tans.

Several members of the Squad assembled at a Dublin safehouse, the Republican Outfitters shop at 94 Talbot Street early on 14 October in preparation for this operation. Treacy was to join them for his own protection, but arrived late, to discover that Collins had cancelled the attack. Treacy was extremely distressed – he and his closest friend, Dan Breen, each thought that the other had been killed. Breen had managed to get away, his feet cut to ribbons by the glass of Professor John Carolan's greenhouse and was now being hidden by the medical staff in a nearby hospital. While the others quietly dispersed, Treacy lingered in the shop. But he had been followed by an informer, and a British Secret Service surveillance team led by Major Carew and Lt Gilbert Price was stalking him in the hope that he would lead them to Collins or to other high-value IRA targets. Treacy realised he was being followed, and ran for his bicycle. But he grabbed the wrong bike – taking a machine far too big for him – and fell. Price drew his pistol and closed in, seizing Treacy around the body. Treacy drew his parabellum automatic pistol and fatally shot Price in the stomach and shot another British agent before he was shot in the head, dying instantly. It was a week before he and May Quigley were to be married.

== Legacy ==
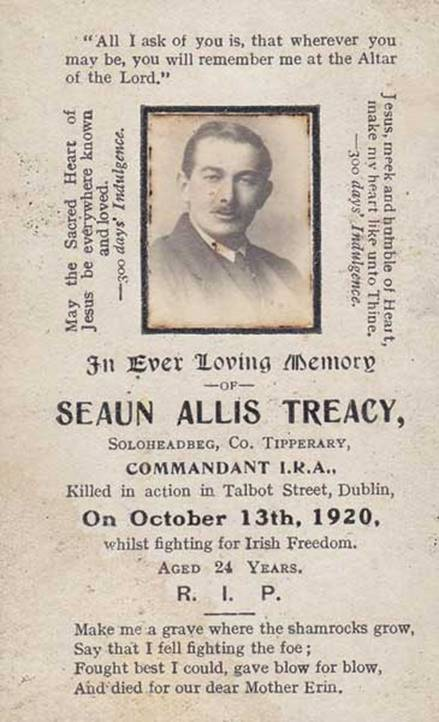
Seán Treacy mass card

Dan Breen considered Treacy "the greatest Irishman of our generation".

A commemorative plaque above the door of 94 Talbot Street, now the Wooden Whisk, directly across from Talbot House, commemorates the spot where Treacy died. His coffin arrived by train at Limerick Junction station and was accompanied to St Nicholas Church, Solohead, by a crowd of Tipperary people. He was buried in Kilfeacle Cemetery, Thomastown, County Tipperary, where, despite a large presence of British military personnel, a volley of shots was fired over the grave.

Treacy is remembered each year on the anniversary of his death at a commemoration ceremony in Kilfeacle. At noon on the day of any All-Ireland Senior Hurling Final in which Tipperary participate, a ceremony of remembrance is held at the spot in Talbot Street, Dublin, where he died, attended mainly by people from West Tipperary and Dublin people of Tipperary extraction. The most recent ceremonies were held on Sunday 4 September 2016, 18 August 2019 and 20 July 2025, each attracting Tipperary folk en route to Croke Park. The ceremony usually consists of the reading of the Proclamation of the Irish Republic, a recitation of a decade of the rosary in Irish, the singing of 'Tipperary so far away', an oration by one of the organising party and the playing of the Irish National Anthem. The first event took place in 1922 and has been held on almost 30 occasions.

In Thurles, County Tipperary, Seán Treacy Avenue is named after him. The town of Tipperary is home to the Seán Treacy Memorial Swimming Pool, which contains many historic items related to the Easter Rising and the War of Independence and a copy of the Proclamation of the Irish Republic. The Seán Treacy GAA Club takes his name in honour and represents the parishes of Hollyford, Kilcommon and Rearcross in the Slieve Felim Hills, which straddle the borderland between the historical North and South Ridings of Tipperary. The song Seán Treacy, also called Tipperary so Far Away, is about Treacy's death and is sung in west Tipperary. A line from this song was quoted by former US president Ronald Reagan when he visited Tipperary in 1984: "And I'll never more roam, from my own native home, in Tipperary so far away".

The song Seán Treacy and Dan Breen commemorates his and Breen's escape from Fernside and mourns his death:

Give me a Parabellum and a bandolier of shells,
Take me to the Murder Gang and I'll blow them all to hell,
For just today, I heard them say that Treacy met defeat,
Our lovely Séan is dead and gone, shot down in Talbot Street.

They were at the front and at the back; they were all around the place. None of them anxious to attack; or meet him face to face. Lloyd George did say, "You'll get your pay – and a holiday most complete", But none of them knew what they would go through, in that house in Talbot Street.

When he saw them in their Crossley trucks, like the fox inside his lair, Seán waited for to size them up before he did emerge,
With blazing guns he met the Huns, and forced them to retreat,
He shot them in pairs coming down the stairs, in that house in Talbot Street.

"Come on", he cried, "'Come show your hand, you have boasted for so long, How you would crush this rebel band with your armies great and strong". "No surrender", was his war cry, "Fight on lads, no retreat" Brave Treacy cried before he died, shot down in Talbot Street.

== Footnotes and References ==
=== Bibliography ===
- Abbott, Richard (2000). Police Casualties in Ireland 1919-1922. Cork.
- Ambrose, Joe (2007). Sean Treacy and the Tan War. Mercier Press. ISBN 978-1-85635-554-4.
- Borgonovo, John (2007). Spies, Informers and the Sinn Fein Society: The intelligence war in Cork City 1920-1921. Dublin.
- Hart, Peter (2005). Mick: The Real Michael Collins. Macmillan. ISBN 978-0-330-48527-2.
- Hart, Peter (2002). Peter Hart (ed.). British Intelligence in Ireland, 1920–1921: The Final Reports. Cork University Press. ISBN 978-1-85918-201-7.
- Hart, Peter (2003). The I.R.A. at war, 1916–1923. Oxford University Press. ISBN 978-0-19-925258-9.
- Ryan, Desmond (1945). Sean Treacy and the Third Tipperary Brigade I.R.A. Kerryman Limited.
- Shelley, John R. (2006). A Short History of the 3rd Tipperary Brigade. Cashel, Ireland.

=== External links ===
- Republican Autograph Book – Seán Treacy at www.clarelibrary.ie
- AN PHOBLACHT/REPUBLICAN NEWS at republican-news.org
- Dominic Behan singing a song commemorating Seán Treacy on YouTube
- Sean Treacy & Talbot street
- Lyrics and chords to Tipperary so far away
