= Dan Breen =

Irish republican and politician (1894–1969)

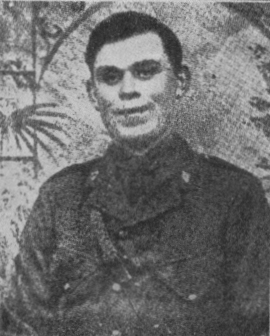
- Breen, c. 1919

Teachta Dála
- In office February 1948 – April 1965
- Constituency: Tipperary South
- In office February 1932 – February 1948
- In office August 1923 – June 1927
- Constituency: Tipperary

Personal details
- Born: 11 August 1894 County Tipperary, Ireland
- Died: 27 December 1969 (aged 75) County Wicklow, Ireland
- Party: Fianna Fáil (from 1932)
- Other political affiliations: Independent (1927–1932) Sinn Féin (until 1927)
- Spouse: Brigid Malone (m. 1921)
- Children: 2

Military service
- Allegiance: Irish Republic
- Branch/service: Irish Republican Army; Anti-Treaty IRA
- Rank: Commandant general
- Battles/wars: Irish War of Independence; Irish Civil War

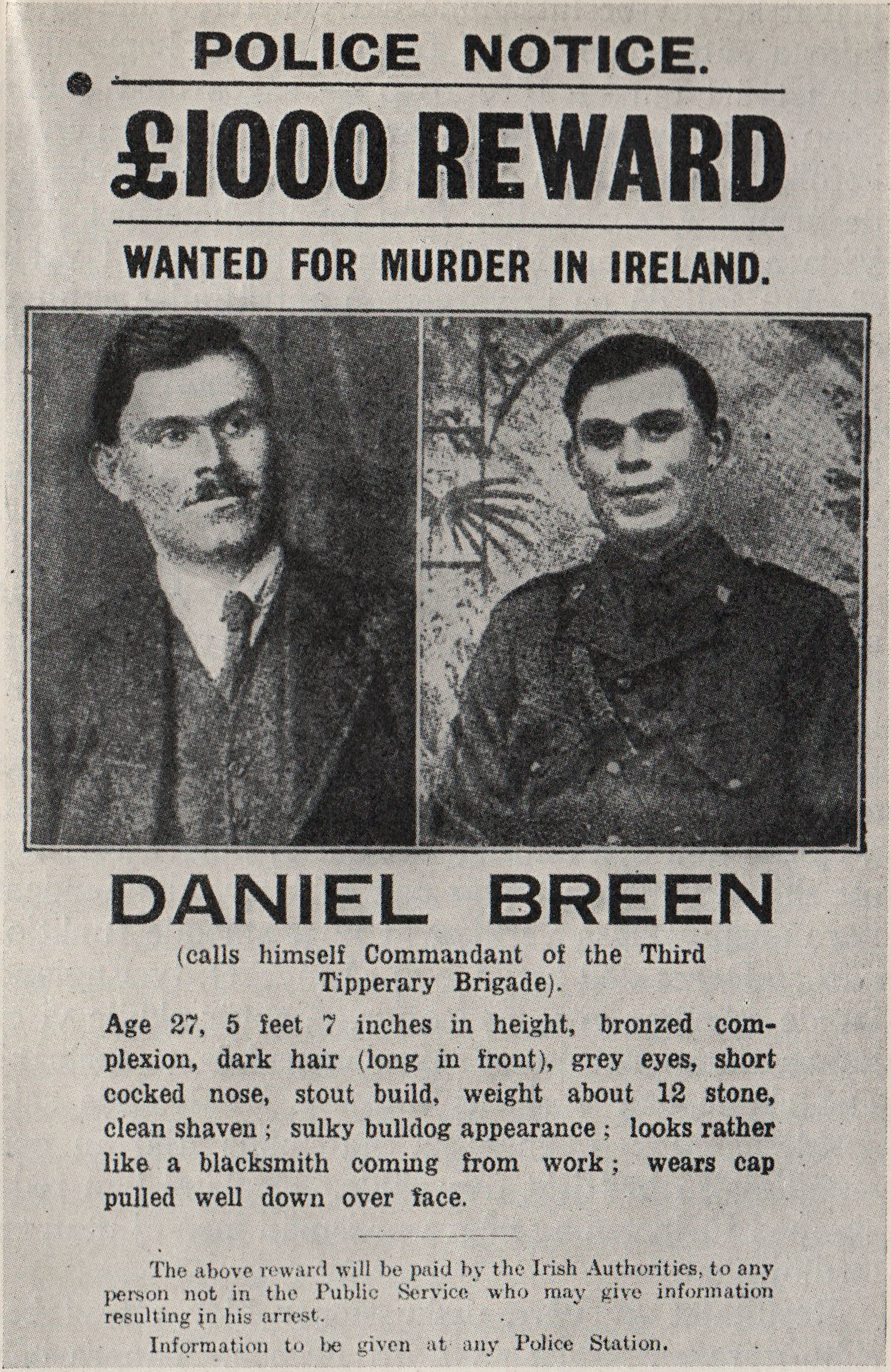
Wanted poster for Breen during the Irish War of Independence

Daniel Breen (10 October 1894 – 27 December 1969) was an Irish republican. He was a member of the Irish Republican Army during the Irish War of Independence and the Irish Civil War and was wounded a number of times. In later years he was a Fianna Fáil politician.

== Background ==
Breen was born on 10 October 1894 in Grange, Donohill parish, County Tipperary, to Daniel Breen senior and Honora Moore. He was the second-youngest of eight siblings. His father died in May 1901 when Breen was six, leaving the family very poor. He was educated locally, before becoming a plasterer and later a linesman on the Great Southern Railways.

== Irish Revolutionary period ==
=== War of Independence ===
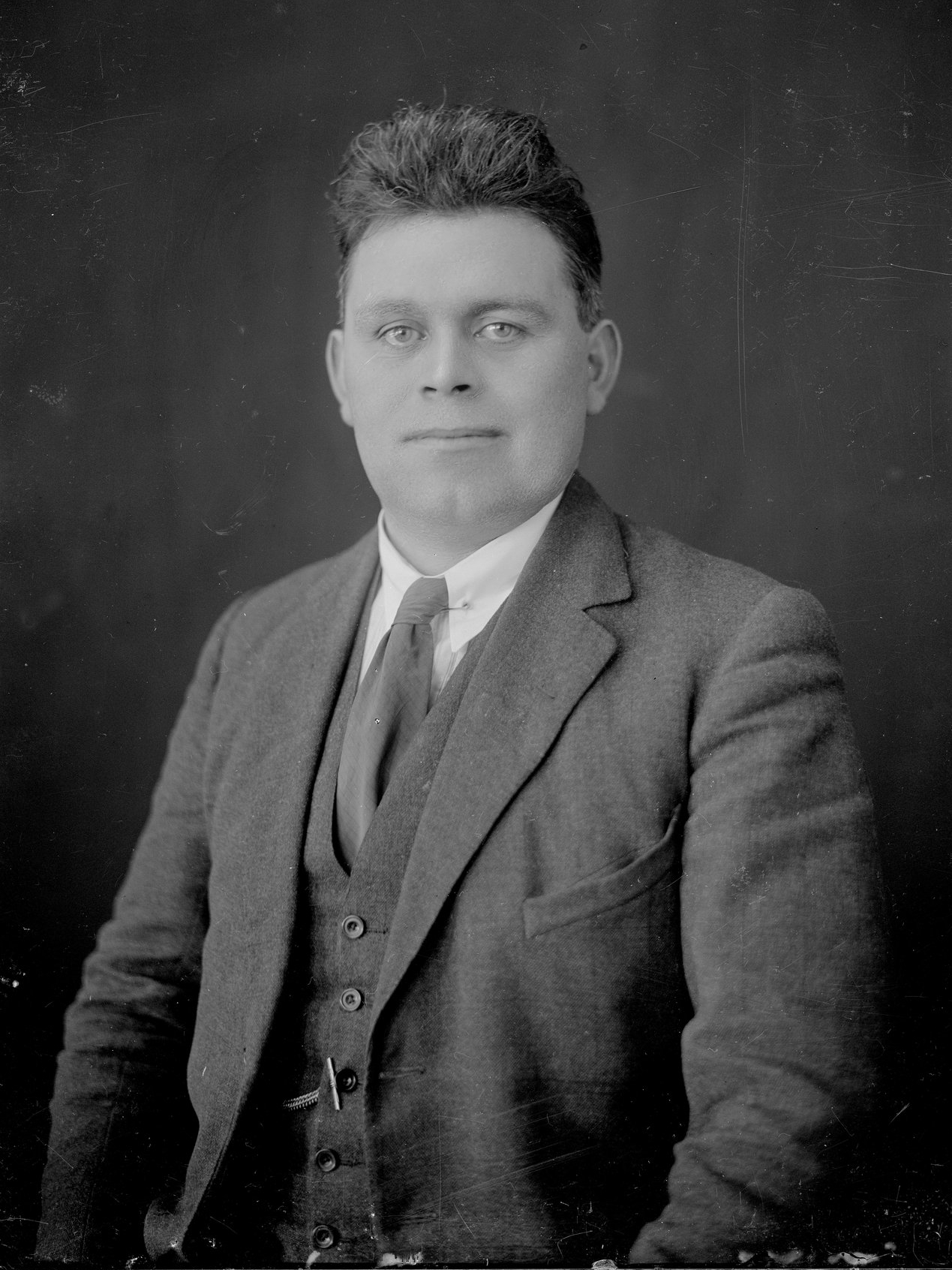
Laurence Breen, fellow Irish Volunteers/IRA man and younger brother of Dan

Breen was sworn into the Irish Republican Brotherhood in 1912 and the Irish Volunteers in 1914. On 21 January 1919, the day the First Dáil met in Dublin, Breen – who described himself as "a soldier first and foremost" – took part in the Soloheadbeg ambush. The ambush party of eight men, led by Séumas Robinson, attacked two Royal Irish Constabulary men who were escorting explosives to a quarry. The two policemen, James McDonnell and Patrick O'Connell, were fatally shot during the incident. The ambush is considered to be the first incident of the Irish War of Independence and was carried out with the help of intelligence supplied by Breen's younger brother and fellow Volunteer Laurence (1900–1940); "Lar" Breen, then aged 18, was imprisoned for "seditious" activities.

Breen later recalled:

"… we took the action deliberately, having thought over the matter and talked it over between us. [Seán] Treacy had stated to me that the only way of starting a war was to kill someone, and we wanted to start a war, so we intended to kill some of the police whom we looked upon as the foremost and most important branch of the enemy forces ... The only regret that we had following the ambush was that there were only two policemen in it, instead of the six we had expected …"

However, Robinson, wrote:

"It was laid down as an order that if only two RIC should accompany the cart they were to be challenged, but if there were six of them they were to be met with a volley as the cart reached the gate. The reason for the difference was that there would be so little danger to us if only two appeared that it would be inhuman not to give them an opportunity of surrendering, but if six police turned up they, with their rifles, would be too great a danger to the eight of us to take any such risk as to challenge them and thus hand over our initiative. We had only one Winchester Repeater rifle and an agglomeration of small-arms."

In the same statement, Robinson described the two policemen as he and Paddy Dwyer jumped out and seized the reins of the horse: "The RIC seemed to be at first amused at the sight of Dan Breen's burly figure with nose and mouth covered with a handkerchief; but with a sweeping glance they saw his revolver and Dwyer and me they could see only three of us. In a flash their rifles were brought up, the bolts worked and triggers pressed two shots rang out, but not from the carbines: the cut-off had been overlooked: The two shots came from Treacy and Tim Crowe. Those shots were the signal for general firing. At the inquest the fatal wounds were 'caused by small-calibre bullets'."

During the conflict, the British put a £1,000 price on Breen's head, which was later raised to £10,000. He quickly established himself as a leader within the Irish Republican Army (IRA). He was known for his courage. On 13 May 1919, he helped rescue his comrade Seán Hogan at gunpoint from a heavily guarded train at Knocklong station in County Limerick. Breen, who was wounded, remembered how the battalion was "vehemently denounced as a cold-blooded assassins" and roundly condemned by the Catholic Church. After the fight, Seán Treacy, Séumas Robinson and Breen met Michael Collins in Dublin, where they were told to escape from the area. They agreed they would "fight it out, of course". Breen and Treacy shot their way out through a British military cordon in the northern suburb of Drumcondra (Fernside). They escaped, only for Treacy to be killed the next day in a shootout with British forces. Breen was shot at least four times, twice in the lung.

The British reaction was to make Tipperary a special military area, with curfews and travel permits. Volunteer GHQ authorised enterprising attacks on barracks. Richard Mulcahy noted that British policy had "pushed rather turbulent spirits such as Breen and Treacy into the Dublin area". The inculcation of the principles of guerrilla warfare was to become an essential part of all training. Breen and Treacy were original members of Collins' The Squad of assassins, later known as the Dublin Guard, when Tipperary became "too hot for them". and Dublin was the centre of the war.

Breen was present in December 1919 at the ambush in Ashtown beside Phoenix Park in Dublin where Martin Savage was killed while trying to assassinate the Lord Lieutenant of Ireland, Viscount French. The IRA men hid behind hedges and a dungheap as the convoy of vehicles came past. They had been instructed to ignore the first car, but this contained their target. Their roadblock failed when a policeman removed the horse-and-cart intended to stop the car. Breen was also part of the IRA team that supported the attack on Rearcross Barracks in north Tipperary on 12 July 1920 by securing the main road from Newport.

Breen was to the fore in the IRA moving to establish "flying columns", full-time mobile units of at least 20 men. Columns used guerrilla warfare to strike at often a long way apart in a short period of time. Sometimes they could sleep in underground dug-outs where arms and ammunition could be held. He became an active member of the 3rd Tipperary Brigade flying column.

Ernie O'Malley later appointed Breen quartermaster of the 2nd Southern Division in May 1921, although he still accompanied his column in the field.

=== Civil War ===
Breen rejected the Anglo-Irish Treaty, which left him angry and embittered:

"I would never have handled a gun or fired a shot … to obtain this Treaty … writing on the second anniversary of Martin Savage's death, do you suppose that he sacrificed his life in attempting to kill one British Governor-General to make room for another British Governor-General?"

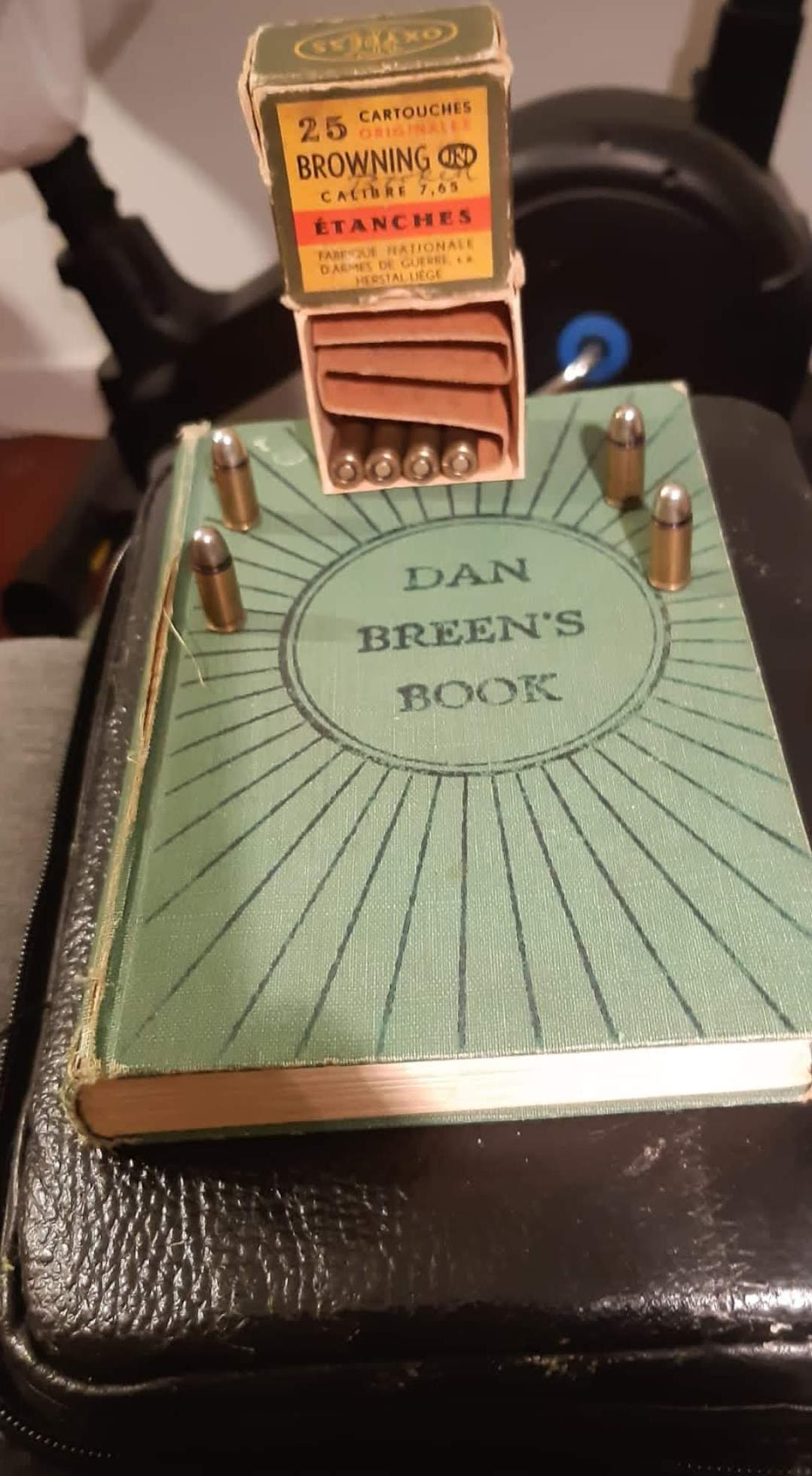
Browning 7.65 pistol ammunition formerly in the possession of Breen

After returning home from America in early 1922, he tried hard to avoid a conflict with comrades who were in favour of the treaty. O'Malley disapproved of Breen's efforts, "a breach of discipline", to find a compromise with the opposing side that spring. Breen eventually joined the Anti-Treaty IRA in its fight against the Provisional Government of Ireland. He was captured in a major state operation in Tipperary in April 1923.

Regarding the continued existence of Northern Ireland from 1922, and an inevitable further war to create a united Ireland, Breen commented:

"To me, a united Ireland of two million people would be preferable to an Ireland of four and a half million divided into three or four factions".

In the June 1922 general election, Breen was nominated as a candidate by both the pro- and anti-Treaty sides, in the Waterford–Tipperary East constituency, but was not elected. On 11 June 1922, Breen began the All-Ireland Football Championship final by throwing the ball in.

=== Post-Civil War ===
In August 1923, while still in custody in Limerick Prison, Breen was elected to Dáil Éireann at the 1923 general election as a republican anti-treaty Teachta Dála (TD) for the Tipperary constituency. He spent two months there before going on hunger strike for six days, followed by a thirst strike of six days. While in prison in September 1923 Breen was knocked unconscious by a blow from a prison guard's baton. Breen was released in the autumn after signing a document to desist from attacking the Free State.

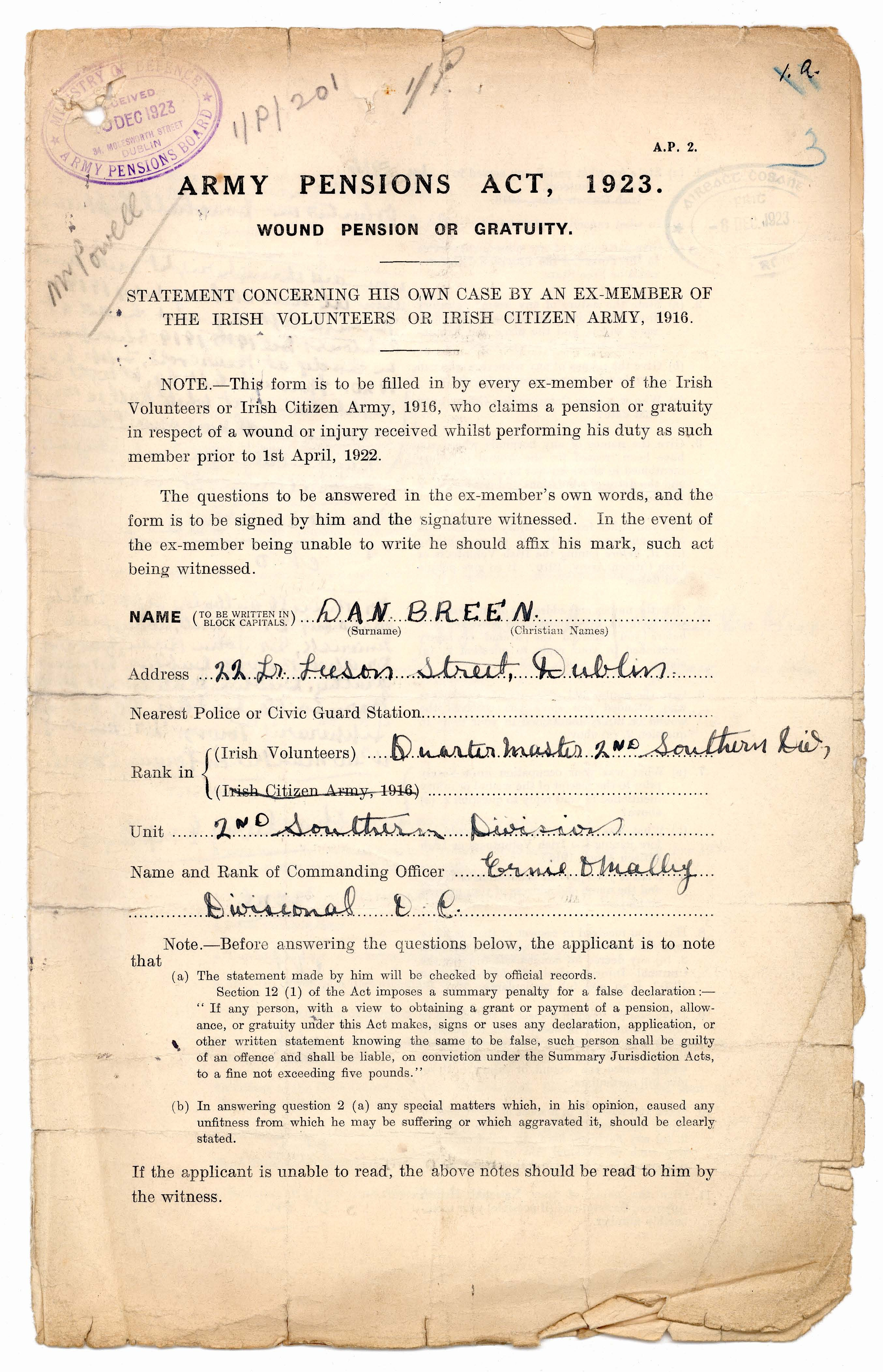
Breen's application for a wound pension, 1923

Breen, then living in Lower Leeson Street, Dublin, sought a wound pension from the Free State in December 1923 under the Army Pensions Act, 1923, and was awarded £150 a year (75% disability from wounds). He later applied for a service pension under the Military Service Pensions Act, 1934. He was awarded nine years' service in 1935 at Grade A for his service with the Irish Volunteers and the IRA between 1 April 1917 and 30 September 1923.

Breen wrote a best-selling account of his guerrilla days, My Fight for Irish Freedom, in 1924.

== Politics ==
=== Fianna Fáil TD ===
In January 1927, he became the first anti-treaty TD to take the Oath of Allegiance and sit in the Dáil Éireann after the establishment of the Irish Free State.

Standing as an Independent Republican he was defeated in the June 1927 general election. Thereafter Breen travelled to the United States, where he opened a speakeasy. He returned to Ireland in 1932 following the death of his mother, and regained his seat as a member of Fianna Fáil in the Dáil at that year's general election. He represented his Tipperary constituency without a break until his retirement at the 1965 election.

=== Foreign policy views ===
Breen supported the Republican side during the Spanish Civil War.

During World War II, he was said to hold largely pro-Axis views, with admiration for Erwin Rommel. When the fascist political party Ailtirí na hAiséirghe failed to win any seats in the 1944 Irish general election, he remarked that he was sorry that the party had not done better as he had studied their programme and found a lot to commend. In 1946, Breen became secretary of the Save the German Children Society. He attended the funeral of Nazi spy Hermann Gortz on 27 May 1947. Irish-American John S. Monagan visited Breen in 1948 and was surprised to see two pictures of Adolf Hitler, a medallion of Napoleon and a Telefunken radio. Breen told him "the revolution didn't work out," and "to get the government they have now, I wouldn't have lost a night's sleep." He also said that he fought for freedom, but not for democracy. In 1943, Breen sent his "congratulations to the Führer. May he live long to lead Europe on the road to peace, security and happiness". After the end of World War II in Europe, the German Legation in Dublin was taken over by diplomats from the US in May 1945: ".. they found a recent letter from Breen asking the German minister to forward his birthday wishes to the Führer, just days before Hitler committed suicide."

Breen was co-chairman of the anti-Vietnam War organisation "Irish Voice on Vietnam", which he founded along with Peadar O'Donnell. From 1964 until his death five years later, Breen became a patron of the Irish Anti-Apartheid Movement, which opposed apartheid in South Africa. A few years prior, in 1960, he took part in a march from Trinity College to the Mansion House in protest of South African apartheid. Trinity News reported that he made a speech wherein he declared that "the white man has no right to be in Africa, and every means to get rid of him was legal".

== Personal life ==
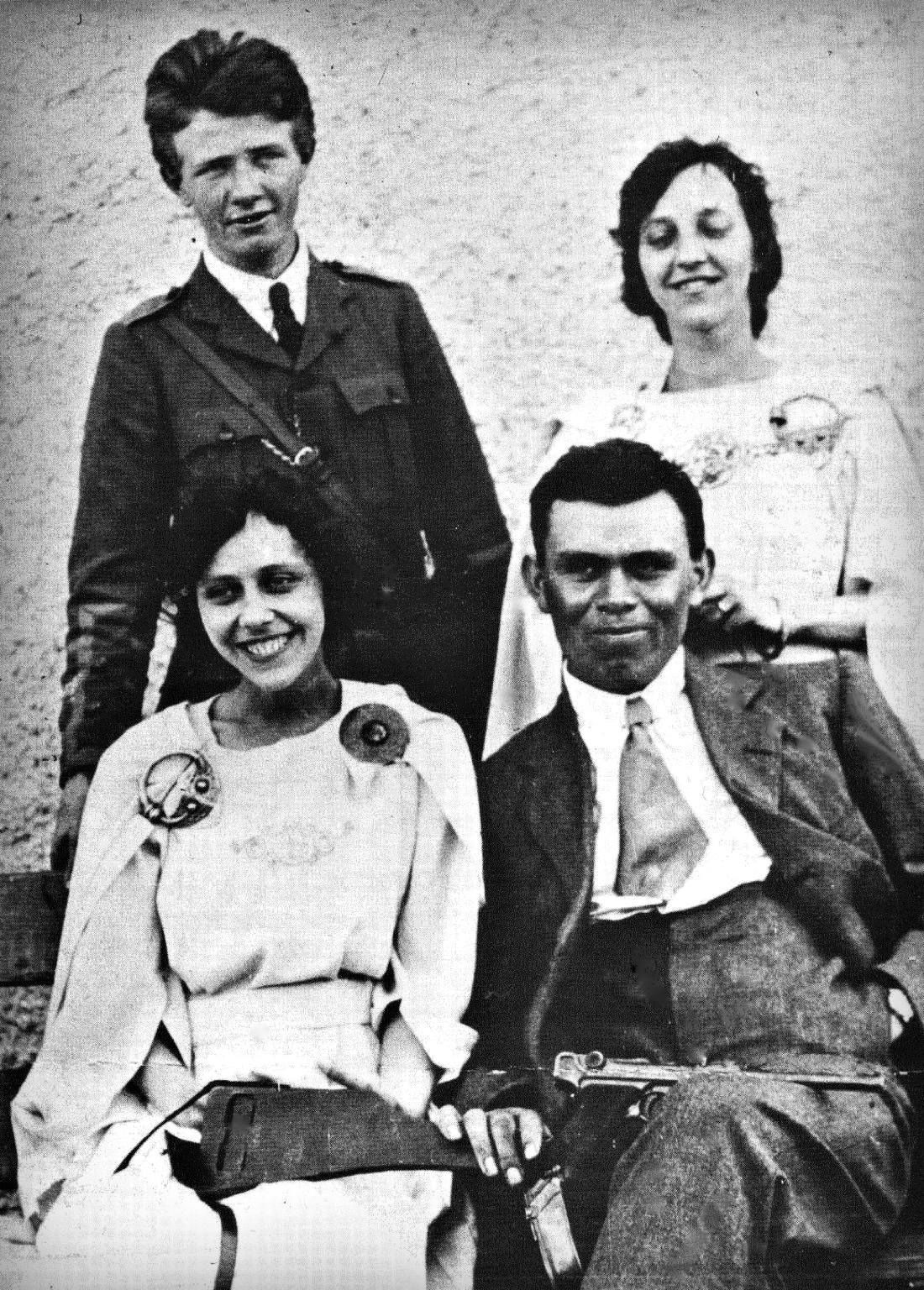
Breen and Brigid Malone (seated) on their wedding day

Breen was married on 12 June 1921 to Brigid Malone, a Dublin Cumann na mBan woman and sister of Lieutenant Michael Malone who was killed in action at the Battle of Mount Street Bridge during the 1916 Rising. They had met in Dublin when she helped to nurse him while he was recovering from a bullet wound.

Seán Hogan was best man and the bride's sister, Aine, was the bridesmaid. Photographs of the wedding celebrations taken by 5th Battalion intelligence officer Séan Sharkey are published in The Tipperary Third Brigade a photographic record. Breen was, at the time, one of the most wanted men in Ireland, and South Tipperary was under martial law, yet a large celebration was held. The wedding took place at Purcell's, "Glenagat House", New Inn, County Tipperary. Many of the key members of the Third Tipperary Brigade attended, including flying column leaders Dinny Lacey and Hogan. Breen was the brother in-law of Commandant Theobald Wolfe Tone FitzGerald, painter of the Irish Republic Flag that flew over the GPO during the Easter Rising in 1916. Many of the Dublin Active Service Unit joined in a party for Dan's wedding; that celebration had to be postponed until after the Truce came into effect on 11 July.

The Breens had two children, Donal and Grainne. Breen was an atheist.

== Death ==
Breen died in a nursing home at Kilcroney House, County Wicklow, in 1969, aged 75. He was buried in Donohill, near his birthplace. His funeral was the largest seen in west Tipperary since that of his close friend and comrade-in-arms, Treacy, at Kilfeacle in October 1920. An estimated attendance of 10,000 mourners assembled in the tiny hamlet, giving ample testimony to the esteem in which he was held.

== In popular culture ==
Breen is mentioned in the Irish folk ballad "The Galtee Mountain Boy", along with Seán Moylan, Dinny Lacey and Seán Hogan. The song, written by Patsy Halloran, recalls some of the travails of a "Flying column" from Tipperary as they fought during the Irish War of Independence and later against the pro-Treaty side during the Irish Civil War.

The trophy for the Tipperary Senior Hurling Championship is named in his honor.

== Bibliography ==
=== Writings ===
- Breen, Dan (1921). My fight for Irish freedom. Dublin: Anvil.

=== Secondary sources ===
- Ambrose, Joe (2007). Dan Breen and the IRA. Mercier Press. ISBN 978-1-85635-506-3.
- Augusteijn, Joost (1996). From Public Defiance to Guerilla Warfare: The Experience of Ordinary Volunteers in the War of Independence 1916-1921. Dublin.
- Dalton, Charles (1929). With the Dublin Brigade (1917-1921). London.
- Maguire, Gloria (1985). The Political and Military Causes of the Division in the Irish Nationalist Movement, January 1921 to August 1921 (D.Phil.). Oxford University.
- Ryan, Desmond (1945). Seán Treacy and the Third Tipperary Brigade. Tralee.
- Townshend, Charles (2005). Easter Rising 1916: The Irish Rebellion. London.
- Townshend, Charles (2014). The Republic: The Fight for Irish Independence. London.

=== External links ===
Media related to Dan Breen at Wikimedia Commons

- Two Killed In Soloheadbeg Ambush 1969 interview with Breen
- Breen the gunman - a blurred line Breen the Gunman: A Blurred Line
- Ricorso Dan Breen
- An Irishman's diary
- My Fight for Irish Freedom – Dan Breen on YouTube
- Lyrics and music to the Ballad of Dan Breen The Ballad Of Dan Breen Song Lyrics
- Lyrics and music to the Galtee Mountain Boy The Galtee Mountain Boy Irish Folk lyrics guitar chords & sheet music

Dáil	Election	Deputy (Party)	Deputy (Party)	Deputy (Party)	Deputy (Party)
13th	1948	Michael Davern (FF)	Richard Mulcahy (FG)	Dan Breen (FF)	John Timoney (CnaP)
14th	1951	Michael Davern (FF)	Richard Mulcahy (FG)	Dan Breen (FF)	Patrick Crowe (FG)
15th	1954	Michael Davern (FF)	Richard Mulcahy (FG)	Dan Breen (FF)	Patrick Crowe (FG)
16th	1957	Michael Davern (FF)	Richard Mulcahy (FG)	Dan Breen (FF)	Frank Loughman (FF)
17th	1961	Michael Davern (FF)	Patrick Hogan (FG)	Dan Breen (FF)	Seán Treacy (Note: Treacy served as Ceann Comhairle in the 20th Dáil from 1973 to 1977, and was returned automatically at the 1977 election. He lost the Labour party whip in February 1985.) (Lab)
18th	1965	Don Davern (FF)	Patrick Hogan (FG)	Jackie Fahey (FF)	Seán Treacy (Lab)
19th	1969	Noel Davern (FF)	Patrick Hogan (FG)	Jackie Fahey (FF)	Seán Treacy (Lab)
20th	1973	Noel Davern (FF)	Brendan Griffin (FG)	Jackie Fahey (FF)	Seán Treacy (Lab)
21st	1977	Noel Davern (FF)	Brendan Griffin (FG)	3 seats 1977–1981	Seán Treacy (Lab)
22nd	1981	Carrie Acheson (FF)	Brendan Griffin (FG)	Seán McCarthy (FF)	Seán Treacy (Lab)
23rd	1982 (Feb)	Seán Byrne (FF)	Brendan Griffin (FG)	Seán McCarthy (FF)	Seán Treacy (Lab)
24th	1982 (Nov)	Seán Byrne (FF)	Brendan Griffin (FG)	Seán McCarthy (FF)	Seán Treacy (Lab)
25th	1987	Noel Davern (FF)	Brendan Griffin (FG)	Seán McCarthy (FF)	Seán Treacy (Note: Treacy served as Ceann Comhairle in the 25th, 26th and 27th Dáil from 1987 to 1997, and was returned automatically at the 1989 and 1992 elections.) (Ind.)
26th	1989	Noel Davern (FF)	Theresa Ahearn (FG)	Michael Ferris (Lab)	Seán Treacy (Ind.)
27th	1992	Noel Davern (FF)	Theresa Ahearn (FG)	Michael Ferris (Lab)	Seán Treacy (Ind.)
28th	1997	Noel Davern (FF)	Theresa Ahearn (FG)	Michael Ferris (Lab)	3 seats from 1997
28th	2000 by-election	Noel Davern (FF)	Theresa Ahearn (FG)	Séamus Healy (Ind.)	3 seats from 1997
28th	2001 by-election	Noel Davern (FF)	Tom Hayes (FG)	Séamus Healy (Ind.)	3 seats from 1997
29th	2002	Noel Davern (FF)	Tom Hayes (FG)	Séamus Healy (Ind.)	3 seats from 1997
30th	2007	Mattie McGrath (FF)	Tom Hayes (FG)	Martin Mansergh (FF)	3 seats from 1997
31st	2011	Mattie McGrath (Ind.)	Tom Hayes (FG)	Séamus Healy (WUA)	3 seats from 1997
32nd	2016	Constituency abolished. See Tipperary			

Dáil	Election	Deputy (Party)	Deputy (Party)	Deputy (Party)
34th	2024	Mattie McGrath (Ind.)	Michael Murphy (FG)	Séamus Healy (Ind.)

Dáil	Election	Deputy (Party)	Deputy (Party)	Deputy (Party)	Deputy (Party)	Deputy (Party)	Deputy (Party)	Deputy (Party)
4th	1923	Dan Breen (Rep)	Séamus Burke (CnaG)	Louis Dalton (CnaG)	Daniel Morrissey (Lab)	Patrick Ryan (Rep)	Michael Heffernan (FP)	Seán McCurtin (CnaG)
5th	1927 (Jun)	Seán Hayes (FF)	Séamus Burke (CnaG)	John Hassett (CnaG)	Daniel Morrissey (Lab)	William O'Brien (Lab)	Michael Heffernan (FP)	Andrew Fogarty (FF)
6th	1927 (Sep)	Seán Hayes (FF)	Séamus Burke (CnaG)	John Hassett (CnaG)	Daniel Morrissey (Lab)	Timothy Sheehy (FF)	Michael Heffernan (FP)	Andrew Fogarty (FF)
7th	1932	Seán Hayes (FF)	Séamus Burke (CnaG)	John Hassett (CnaG)	Daniel Morrissey (Ind.)	Timothy Sheehy (FF)	Dan Breen (FF)	Andrew Fogarty (FF)
8th	1933	Seán Hayes (FF)	Séamus Burke (CnaG)	Richard Curran (NCP)	Daniel Morrissey (CnaG)	Martin Ryan (FF)	Dan Breen (FF)	Andrew Fogarty (FF)
9th	1937	William O'Brien (Lab)	Séamus Burke (FG)	Jeremiah Ryan (FG)	Daniel Morrissey (FG)	Martin Ryan (FF)	Dan Breen (FF)	Andrew Fogarty (FF)
10th	1938	Frank Loughman (FF)	Richard Curran (FG)	Jeremiah Ryan (FG)	Daniel Morrissey (FG)	Martin Ryan (FF)	Dan Breen (FF)	Andrew Fogarty (FF)
11th	1943	Richard Stapleton (Lab)	William O'Donnell (CnaT)	Jeremiah Ryan (FG)	Daniel Morrissey (FG)	Martin Ryan (FF)	Dan Breen (FF)	Andrew Fogarty (FF)
12th	1944	Frank Loughman (FF)	William O'Donnell (CnaT)	Richard Mulcahy (FG)	Daniel Morrissey (FG)	Mary Ryan (FF)	Dan Breen (FF)	Andrew Fogarty (FF)
12th	1947 by-election	Frank Loughman (FF)	Patrick Kinane (CnaP)	Richard Mulcahy (FG)	Daniel Morrissey (FG)	Mary Ryan (FF)	Dan Breen (FF)	Andrew Fogarty (FF)
13th	1948	Constituency abolished. See Tipperary North and Tipperary South						

Dáil	Election	Deputy (Party)	Deputy (Party)	Deputy (Party)	Deputy (Party)	Deputy (Party)
32nd	2016	Séamus Healy (WUA)	Alan Kelly (Lab)	Jackie Cahill (FF)	Michael Lowry (Ind.)	Mattie McGrath (Ind.)
33rd	2020	Martin Browne (SF)	Alan Kelly (Lab)	Jackie Cahill (FF)	Michael Lowry (Ind.)	Mattie McGrath (Ind.)
34th	2024	Constituency abolished. See Tipperary North and Tipperary South				
