= Séumas Robinson (Irish republican) =

Irish republican and politician (1890–1961)

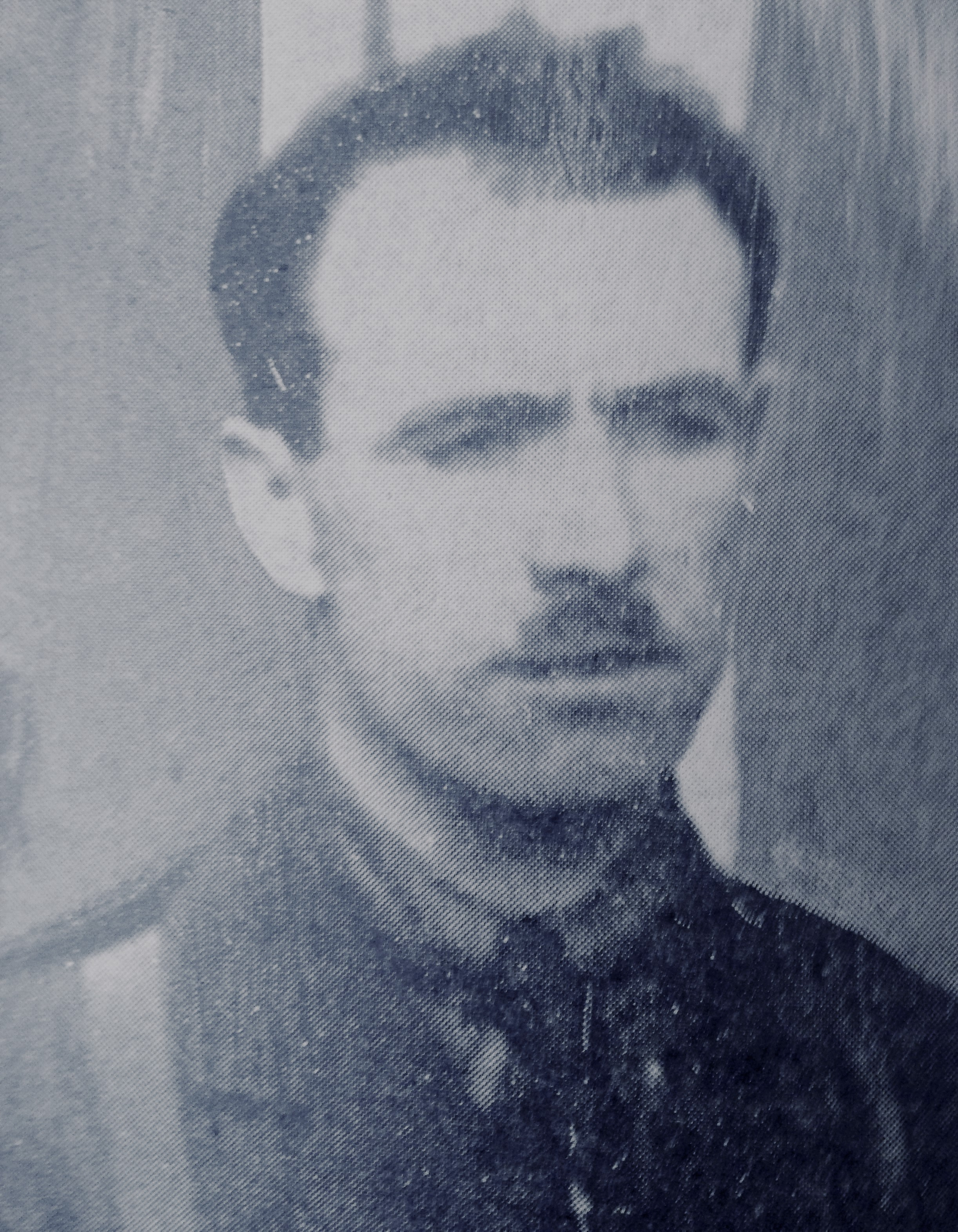
- Robinson in 1922

Senator
- In office 12 December 1928 – 11 December 1935

Teachta Dála
- In office May 1921 – June 1922
- Constituency: Waterford–Tipperary East

Personal details
- Born: 6 January 1890 Belfast, Ireland
- Died: 8 December 1961 (aged 71) Dublin, Ireland
- Party: Fianna Fáil; Sinn Féin
- Spouse: Brigid Keating
- Children: 8

Military service
- Branch/service: Irish Republican Army; Anti-Treaty IRA
- Battles/wars: Easter Rising; Irish War of Independence; Irish Civil War

Séumas Robinson (Irish: Séumas Mac Róibín; né James Robinson; 6 January 1890 – 8 December 1961) was an Irish republican and politician.

== Background ==
Robinson was born as James Robinson at 22 Sevastopol Street in Belfast on 6 January 1890, a son of James Robinson, an insurance agent, and Sarah Jane (Black) Robinson. His family had an Irish Republican/Fenian background, with his grandfather, James Robinson, being a member of the Irish Republican Brotherhood who fled to France following the failed Fenian Rising of 1867. Additionally, Robinson's older brother, Joseph, was active in Irish nationalist circles in the 1900s as a member of the Gaelic League, Gaelic Athletic Association and Fianna Eireann. In 1902, he joined the first Fianna Éireann under Bulmer Hobson. In 1903, the Robinson family moved to Glasgow, where Robinson joined the Conradh na Gaeilge prior to entering a seminary. Robinson served as monk in Scotland in his early adulthood until he got permission in 1913 from the abbot to leave the monastery and participate in the Irish independence movement. He married Brigid Keating and had eight children.

== Revolutionary ==
=== 1916 Easter Rising ===
Robinson and his brother Joseph joined the Irish Volunteers and the Irish Republican Brotherhood in 1913 in Glasgow, and in January 1916 joined the Kimmage Garrison in Dublin. He was appointed section leader by his superior George Plunkett and participated in the 1916 Easter Rising. On Easter Monday, he marched his section to Sackville Street and was greeted by Peadar Bracken who showed him an order from Commandant James Connolly which directed him to seize Hopkins and Hopkins jeweller's on the corner of Sackville Street. He held this position under constant fire until Thursday where he directed his section across the road to the General Post Office. Remarkably, his entire section survived this perilous manoeuvre. He was then stationed in the GPO and the Metropole Hotel for the remainder of the week. He was originally sentenced to death by William Lowe for his part in the Rising, but his sentence was subsequently commuted by General John Maxwell. He was then sent to Frongach internment camp for a number of months and was released on Christmas Eve 1916.

=== Irish War of Independence ===
In 1917 Robinson came to Tipperary at the request of Eamon Uí Dubhir, whom he had met while they were both imprisoned. Robinson became active in the work of the Irish Volunteers in South Tipperary, and in 1918 was elected as commanding officer of the 3rd Tipperary Brigade. In 1919 together with Seán Treacy, Dan Breen and Seán Hogan, he led the party which took part in an attack on a convoy transporting gelignite during the Soloheadbeg ambush in County Tipperary on the same day that First Dáil met. They shot the two policemen dead and stole the explosive. This is considered to be the first engagement of the Irish War of Independence.

A few weeks after the ambush, Robinson decided to join Seán Hogan, Seán Treacy and Dan Breen on the run. These four men were referred to as 'the big four' and were keenly sought by the Royal Irish Constabulary (RIC) and the British military. A large police and military manhunt was launched to find them. A thousand-pound reward was offered for information leading to their capture, this was later raised to ten thousand pounds. The Police Gazette, ‘The Hue and Cry' regularly published accurate descriptions of the wanted men. The houses of known or suspected nationalists were ransacked by the RIC. Fairs and markets were banned in South Tipperary and martial law was imposed. On 23 February 1919, at a Brigade meeting in Nodstown, County Tipperary, Robinson and other Brigade officers drafted a proclamation (signed by Robinson) ordering all British military and police forces out of South Tipperary and, if they stayed they would be held to have "forfeited their lives". GHQ refused to sanction the proclamation and demanded it not be publicly displayed. Despite this it was still posted in several places in Tipperary. The leadership of the Irish Volunteers in Dublin, arranged for the big four to be shipped to America, however they refused to go. Robinson and Treacy travelled to Dublin and met Michael Collins and told him that they, along with Hogan and Breen, would remain in Ireland.

Following Hogan's capture in May 1919, Robinson took part in his rescue at Knocklong railway station in East Limerick while Hogan was being transported from Thurles to Cork. After Knocklong, Robinson, Sean Treacy, Dan Breen and Sean Hogan relocated to Dublin where they participated with Dublin volunteers in a number of attacks in the early part of the war. On 19 December 1919, a group of eleven IRA men, including Treacy, Robinson, Hogan, Paddy Daly, Joe Leonard, Martin Savage and Breen attempted the assassination of the Lord Lieutenant of Ireland, Lord French.

Robinson returned to Tipperary at the end of 1919 to resume his role commanding the 3rd Tipperary Brigade. Under Robinson's leadership a series of attacks on RIC barracks were undertaken by the brigade in 1920. In September 1920 he appointed Dinny Lacey as O/C of the brigade's first flying column and later that year he established the brigade's second flying column with Seán Hogan as O/C. In April 1921, he became the second in command of the IRA Second Southern Division, under Ernie O'Malley.

=== Civil War ===
He was opposed to the Anglo-Irish Treaty and voted against it. When the Irish Civil War broke out over the Treaty, Robinson sent some of his Tipperary men to help the anti-Treaty IRA fighters in Dublin, after a plea from Oscar Traynor. However, the Tipperary contingent arrived too late to take part in the Battle of Dublin. At the outbreak of civil war, he was appointed O/C of the IRA Southern Division. He was critical of the leadership of the anti-Treaty side saying they had no coherent military or political strategy.

== Politics ==
At the 1921 general election, Robinson was elected to Dáil Éireann as a Sinn Féin TD for Waterford–Tipperary East. He failed to win a seat at the 1922 general election. Robinson left Sinn Féin and was a founding member of Fianna Fáil. He was elected to Seanad Éireann for Fianna Fáil in 1928 and re-elected in 1931 and 1934. He resigned his Seanad seat in December 1935 after serving for eight years.

== Later life ==
In 1947 he was appointed one of the five founding members of the Bureau of Military History, associated with the history of the independence movement that lasted from 1913 to 1921 and was responsible for appointing military pensions to all those who had fought in the conflict from this period. Robinson died in Dublin on 8 December 1961 aged 72.

Dáil	Election	Deputy (Party)	Deputy (Party)	Deputy (Party)	Deputy (Party)	Deputy (Party)
2nd	1921	Eamon Dee (SF)	Frank Drohan (SF)	Cathal Brugha (SF)	Vincent White (SF)	Séumas Robinson (SF)
3rd	1922	John Butler (Lab)	Nicholas Phelan (Lab)	Cathal Brugha (AT-SF)	Vincent White (PT-SF)	Daniel Byrne (FP)
4th	1923	Constituency abolished. See Waterford and Tipperary				
