= Ernie O'Malley =

Irish republican and writer (1897–1957)

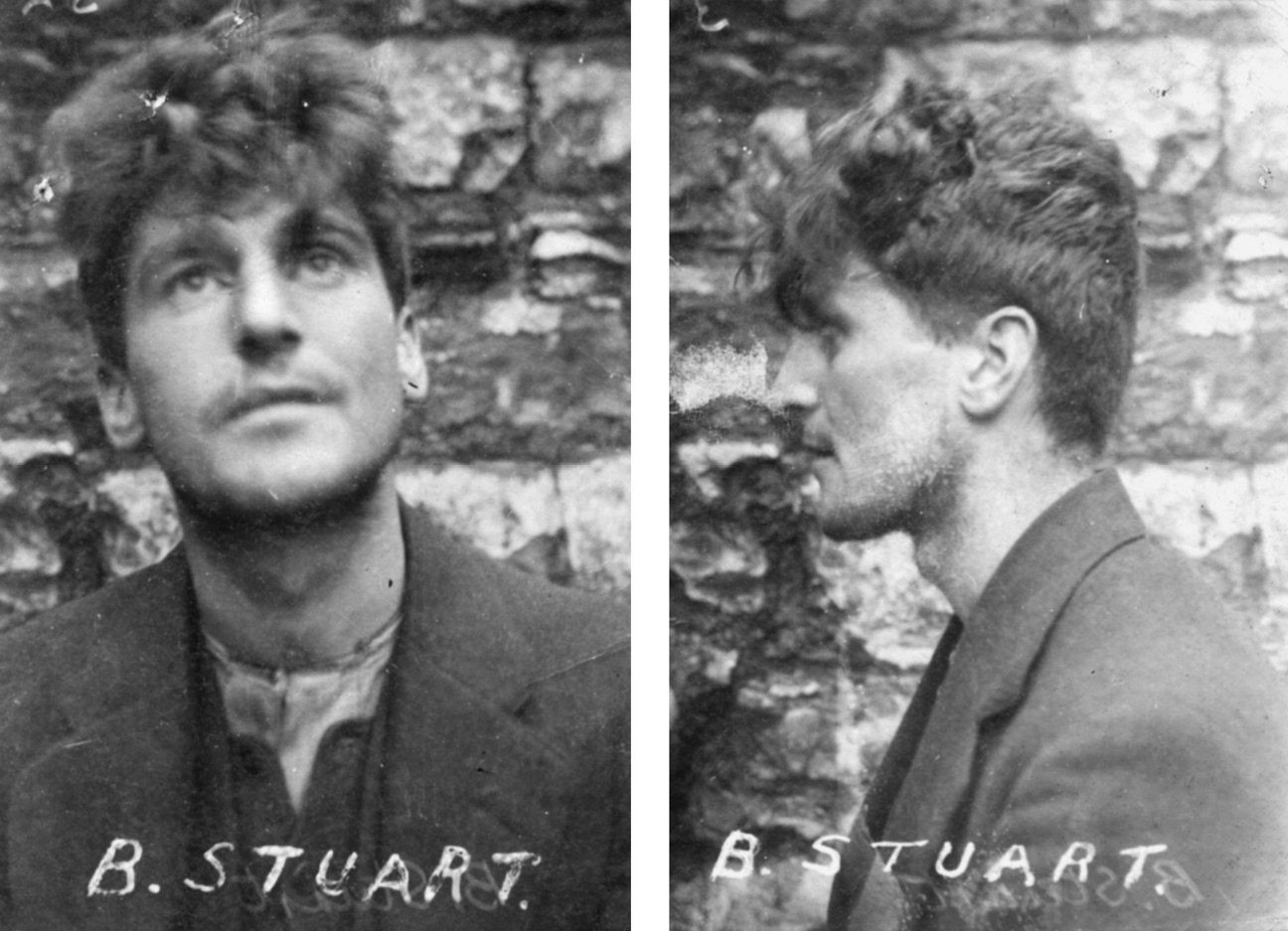
- O'Malley pictured under an alias in Kilmainham Gaol, January 1921

Personal details
- Born: Ernest Bernard Malley; 26 May 1897 Castlebar, County Mayo, Ireland
- Died: 25 March 1957 (aged 59) Howth, County Dublin, Ireland

Military service
- Allegiance: Irish Republican Army; Anti-Treaty IRA
- Years of service: 1916–1923
- Rank: Commandant-general
- Battles/wars: Irish War of Independence; Irish Civil War

Ernest Bernard Malley (Irish: Earnán Ó Máille; 26 May 1897 – 25 March 1957) (Note: Once he joined the Irish revolutionary cause in 1916, O'Malley began to use versions of his name that reflected an Irish, as opposed to a British, identity. In particular, he adopted the prefix 'O', which means "grandson" in the Irish language and which is very common throughout the island and abroad. Hence, one finds him called Ernie (a short form of "Ernest") O'Malley, as well as Earnán O'Malley and Earnán Ó Máille, his full name in the Irish language. See "Ernie O'Malley: the Bohemian revolutionary who traveled the world". The Irish Times, 1 October 2020: https://www.rte.ie/history/2020/1004/1168518-ernie-omalley-the-bohemian-revolutionary/) was an Irish republican and writer. After a sheltered upbringing, as a young medical student in Dublin he witnessed and participated in the Easter Rising of 1916, an event that changed his outlook fundamentally. O'Malley soon joined the Irish Volunteers before leaving home in spring 1918 to become an IRA organiser and training officer during the Irish War of Independence against British rule in Ireland. In the later period of that conflict, he was appointed a divisional commander with the rank of general. Subsequently, O'Malley strongly opposed the Anglo-Irish Treaty and became assistant chief of staff of the Anti-Treaty IRA during the Irish Civil War of 1922–1923.

After being severely wounded in a gun battle with Free State troops in November 1922, O'Malley was taken prisoner. He endured forty-one days on hunger strike in late 1923 and was the very last republican to be released from internment by the Free State authorities in July 1924. He then spent two years in Europe and North Africa to improve his health before returning to Ireland. Following an abortive attempt to resume his medical studies, O'Malley went to the United States to raise funds for a new nationalist newspaper and spent seven years wandering around the country and Mexico before beginning his writing and coming back to Ireland. In 1935 he married an American sculptor Helen Hooker. He became well known in the arts and had a deep interest in folklore.

He wrote two memoirs, On Another Man's Wound and The Singing Flame, and two histories, Raids and Rallies and Rising-Out: Seán Connolly of Longford, covering his early life, the war of independence and the civil war period. These published works, in addition to his role as a senior leader on the losing side in the civil war, mark him as a primary source in the study of early twentieth-century Irish history and society. O'Malley also interviewed 450 people who participated in the war of independence and the civil war. Much of the evidence he gathered from them represents the activities and opinions of the ordinary soldier. By the time of his death in 1957, he had become a "deeply respected military hero".

Although he was elected, against his wishes, to Dáil Éireann in 1923 while in prison, O'Malley eschewed politics. As an Irish republican, he saw himself primarily as a soldier who had "fought and killed the enemies of our nation". The violent struggle in which O'Malley engaged, failed to achieve his key goal of all-island self-determination.

== Early life ==
O'Malley was born in Castlebar, County Mayo, on 26 May 1897. His was a middle class Catholic family in which he was the second of eleven children born to local man Luke Malley and his wife Marion (née Kearney) from Castlereagh, County Roscommon. The family's storytelling governess also lived with them in Ellison Street. The house was opposite a Royal Irish Constabulary (RIC) barracks. O'Malley noted the importance of the police and that officers would nod in courtesy when his father walked by. As a child, he often visited the barracks and was given a tour of it. He also remembered RIC men dressed in suits leaving the town to keep peace at Orange parades in the North.

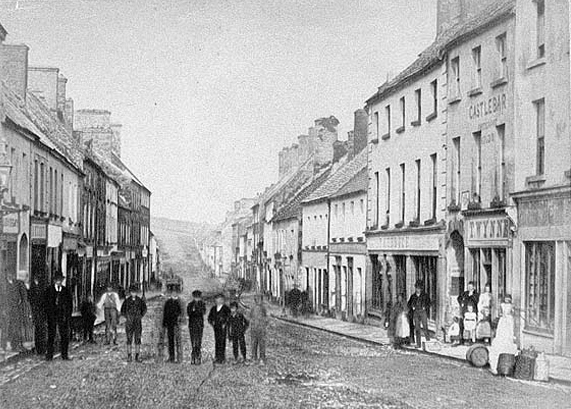
Main Street, Castlebar, c. 1900

Although O'Malley heard of prominent political names like Parnell and Redmond at the dinner table, his parents never spoke of Ireland to him and his siblings. It was as if "nationality did not exist to disturb or worry normal life" in Castlebar, which he called a "shoneen town", meaning "a little John Bull town". (Note: "Shoneen" is the Irish term for "John Bull". Its literal meaning is "Little John", a pejorative play on John Bull, a figurative term for the United Kingdom and England in particular) Still, he was able to learn a little bit of Irish. O'Malley's father was a solicitor's clerk with conservative Irish nationalist politics: he supported the Irish Parliamentary Party. Priests dined in the Malley house and the family had privileged seats at Mass. The family spent the summer at Clew Bay, where O'Malley developed a lifelong love of the sea. He recounts meeting an old woman who, prophetically, spoke of fighting and trouble in store for him.

=== Dublin ===
The Malleys moved to Dublin in 1906 when Ernie was still a boy. The 1911 census lists them living at 7 Iona Drive, Glasnevin, a northern suburb. His father obtained a post with the Congested Districts Board and later became a senior civil servant. O'Malley considered that he received a reasonably good education at the O'Connell Christian Brothers School in North Richmond St, where he "rubbed shoulders with all classes and conditions". His nickname there was "Red Mick". He was later to win a scholarship to study medicine at University College Dublin. Joseph Devlin, the Belfast nationalist MP, visited O'Malley's school and made a very favourable impression on the boy.

However, he was less impressed by the visit of King Edward VII to Dublin in July 1907, when he was aged ten, noting that he "didn't like the English" and spelt "king" with a small letter. O'Malley heard James Larkin and James Connolly speak during the great Dublin lock-out of 1913–1914. He witnessed heavy violence by the police and was in favour of the strikers' cause. He also observed the Irish Citizen Army drilling. He heard of the Howth gun-running incident that occurred in July 1914 and that three people had been killed in the aftermath.

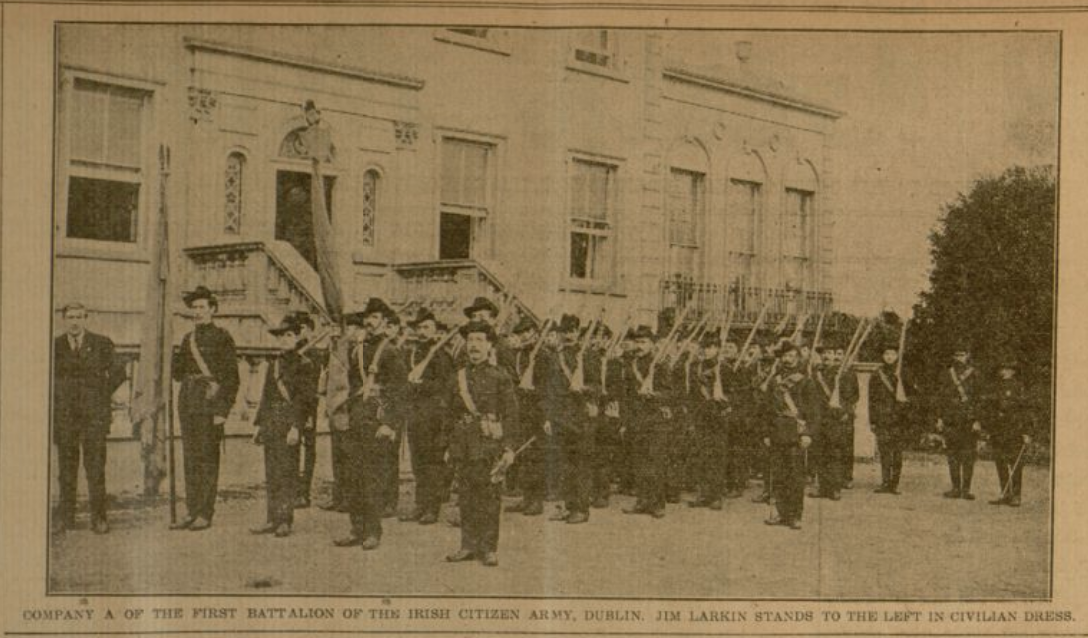
Larkin and the Irish Citizen Army

His older brother, Frank, and next younger brother, Albert, joined the Royal Dublin Fusiliers in the British Army at the outbreak of World War I. O'Malley saw prime minister H. H. Asquith in Dublin, where he had come to urge Irishmen to do their bit for the war effort. He was initially indifferent to the Irish Citizen Army and the Irish Volunteers, whom he had observed drilling in the mountains. At that time, O'Malley was planning to join the British Army, like his friends and brothers. In August 1915, he saw the body of veteran Irish republican Jeremiah O'Donovan Rossa lying in state and witnessed the funeral procession at Glasnevin Cemetery.

== Revolutionary career ==
=== Easter Rising and Irish Volunteers ===
O'Malley was in his first year of studying medicine at University College Dublin when the Easter Rising, which was soon to leave an "indelible mark" on him, convulsed the city in April 1916. He recalls that, on Easter Monday, he saw a new flag of green, white and orange on top of the General Post Office in Sackville Street (now O'Connell Street) and later read the Proclamation of the Republic at the base of Nelson's Pillar. Of the leaders of the new "Provisional Government of the Irish Republic", O'Malley had previously met Tom Clarke and Thomas MacDonagh.

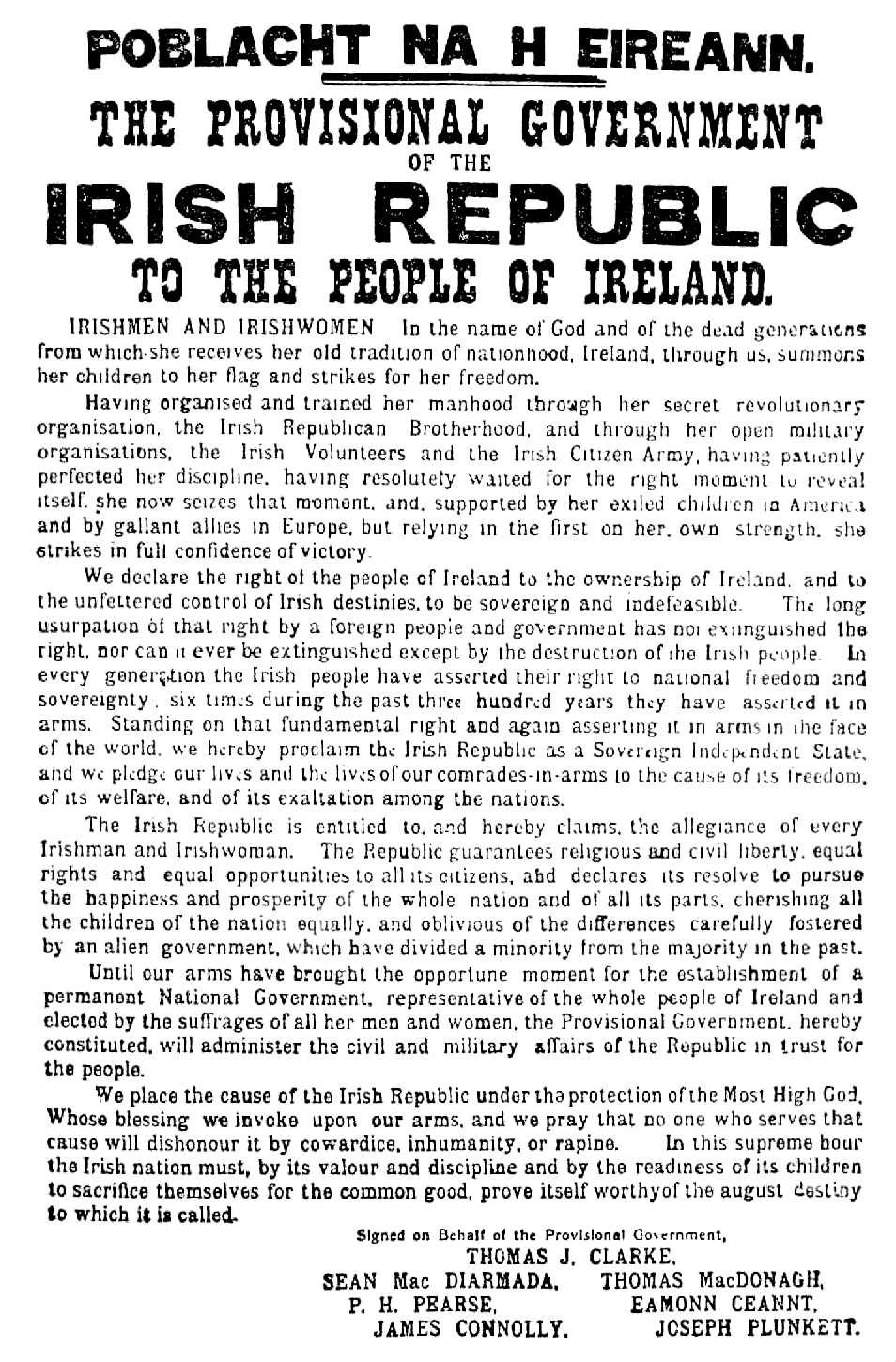
Proclamation of the Irish Republic

O'Malley was almost persuaded by some anti-rising friends to join them in defending Trinity College against the rebels should they attempt to take it. O'Malley writes that he was offered the use of a rifle if he would return later and assist them. On his way home, he encountered an acquaintance who observed that O'Malley would be shooting fellow Irishmen, for whom he had no hatred, if he took that rifle. However, O'Malley recalls that his main feeling was one of mere annoyance at the inconvenience the fighting was causing. O'Malley kept a diary of what he saw during the rising, including looting.

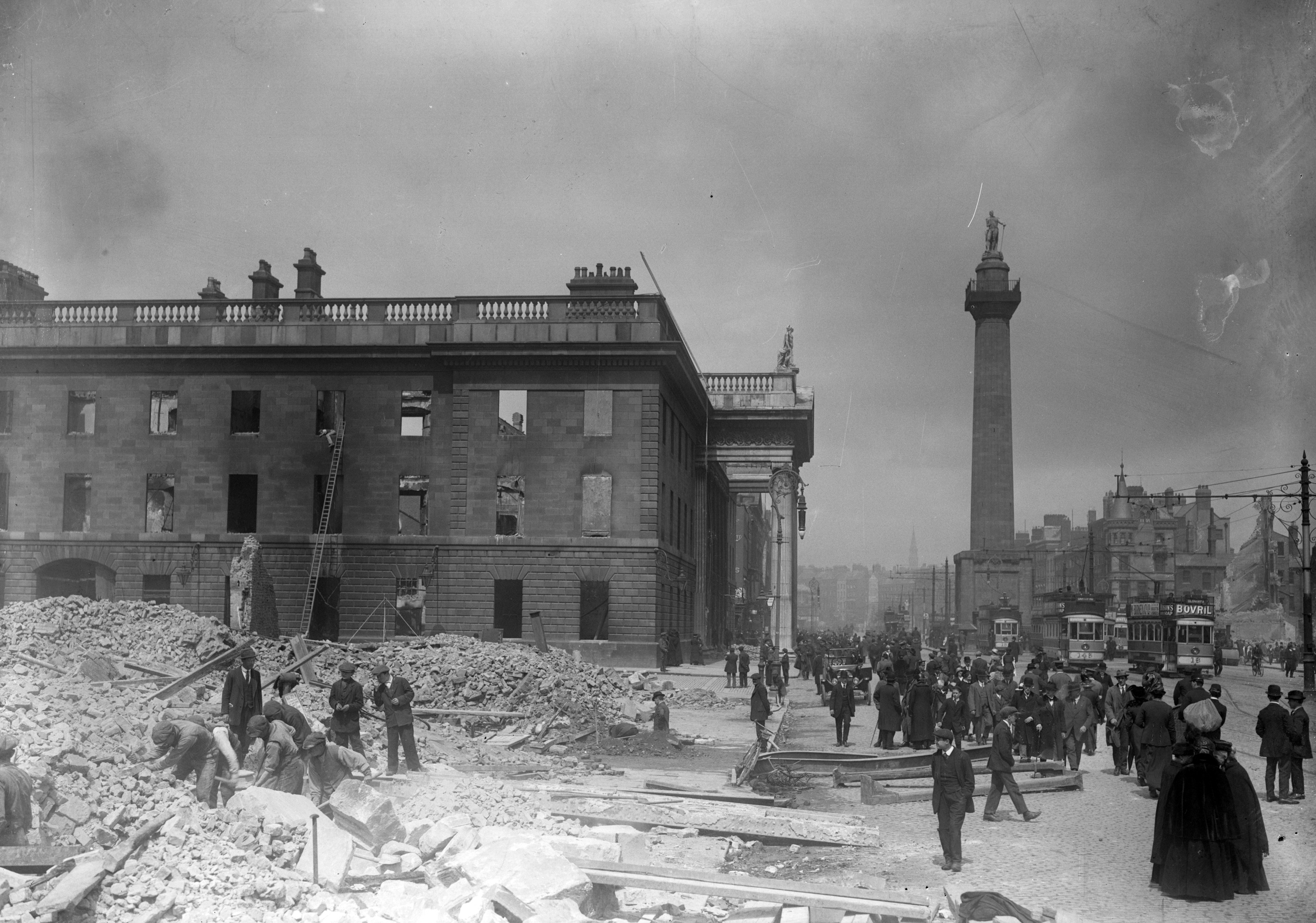
Ruins of the General Post Office

After some thought, he decided that his sympathies lay with the nationalists: only Irish people had the right to settle Irish questions. Therefore, he and a school friend attacked British troops with a rifle. "My father was given one, a German Mauser", he was told, "... by a soldier who brought it back from the front". This was O'Malley's first experience of using a weapon, a dangerous action that could have cost him his life. He and his friend made their escape before they were surrounded, but not before agreeing to meet up the following night. One commentator states that those responsible for O'Malley's pension claim in the 1930s "appear to have taken him at his word for the three days of peripatetic sniping activity" in the second part of Easter week. The resentment O'Malley felt at the shooting by firing squad of three of the signatories to the proclamation turned to rage at the execution in early May of John MacBride, whom he knew from visits to the family home.

Soon after the rising, O'Malley became deeply involved in Irish republican activism. In August 1916, he had been invited to join the Irish Volunteers, Dublin 4th Battalion, which operated south of the River Liffey. However, because that battalion was quite a distance away, some time after Christmas 1916 he became a member of the 1st Battalion, F Company, because its base north of the Liffey was much nearer the family home. Later he was assigned to signals. From only twelve men in 1916, that company grew steadily during 1917 and 1918 under the captaincy of first Frank McCabe then Liam Archer.

O'Malley was unable to come and go freely from the family home, to which he was not given a key. That reality and his medical studies made it difficult to be on parade, and had to refuse training to become a non-commissioned officer. His three younger brothers helped keep his activities quiet, and older brother Frank, now a British army officer of whom he was very fond, knew nothing about his brother's nationalist activities. Despite passing his first university examinination in the autumn of 1916, O'Malley was spending less and less time at his studies and eventually lost his medical scholarship.

F Company engaged in drilling and parades from its secret drill hall at 25 Parnell Square; sometimes senior figures from the battalion staff were present. During a baton charge in Westmoreland Street, O'Malley and his colleagues knocked over a policeman and ran off with his baton. In the second half of 1917, he joined the Gaelic League.

O'Malley paid £4, a considerable sum, for a rifle of his own. It was a Lee-Enfield .303, which he hid in his bedroom. Later, in order to acquire a modern firearm, O'Malley donned his brother's British Army uniform and, armed with a loaded "bulldog .45" revolver, entered Dublin Castle. He held his nerve sufficiently to obtain a permit to purchase a Smith & Wesson .38 revolver and 200 rounds of ammunition.

==== Field organiser ====
O'Malley was finding it increasingly difficult to hide his activities from his parents, who queried the motives of the Irish Volunteers. Eventually, in early March 1918, he left both his studies and the family home and went on the run, working full-time for the Irish Volunteers, later called the IRA. (Note: In early 1919, the Irish Volunteers took an oath to uphold the Irish Republic. As the army of the republic, the movement became known as the "Irish Republican Army") It would be more than three years until he would see his family again.

At the time he became attached to General Headquarters (GHQ) Organisational Staff under Michael Collins, there were not more than ten people who worked full-time for the Volunteers. While he was told which brigade area he was to work in and his best local contacts, O'Malley was given no detailed orders; instead, he was largely left to his own devices in organising rural brigades. This duty brought him to at least 18 brigade areas around Ireland. On one occasion he attended a meeting of the Ulster Volunteer Force in Derry City for intelligence gathering but picked up nothing.

GHQ first dispatched O'Malley to assistant chief of staff, Richard Mulcahy, at Dungannon, County Tyrone. He was appointed second lieutenant in charge of the Coalisland district.

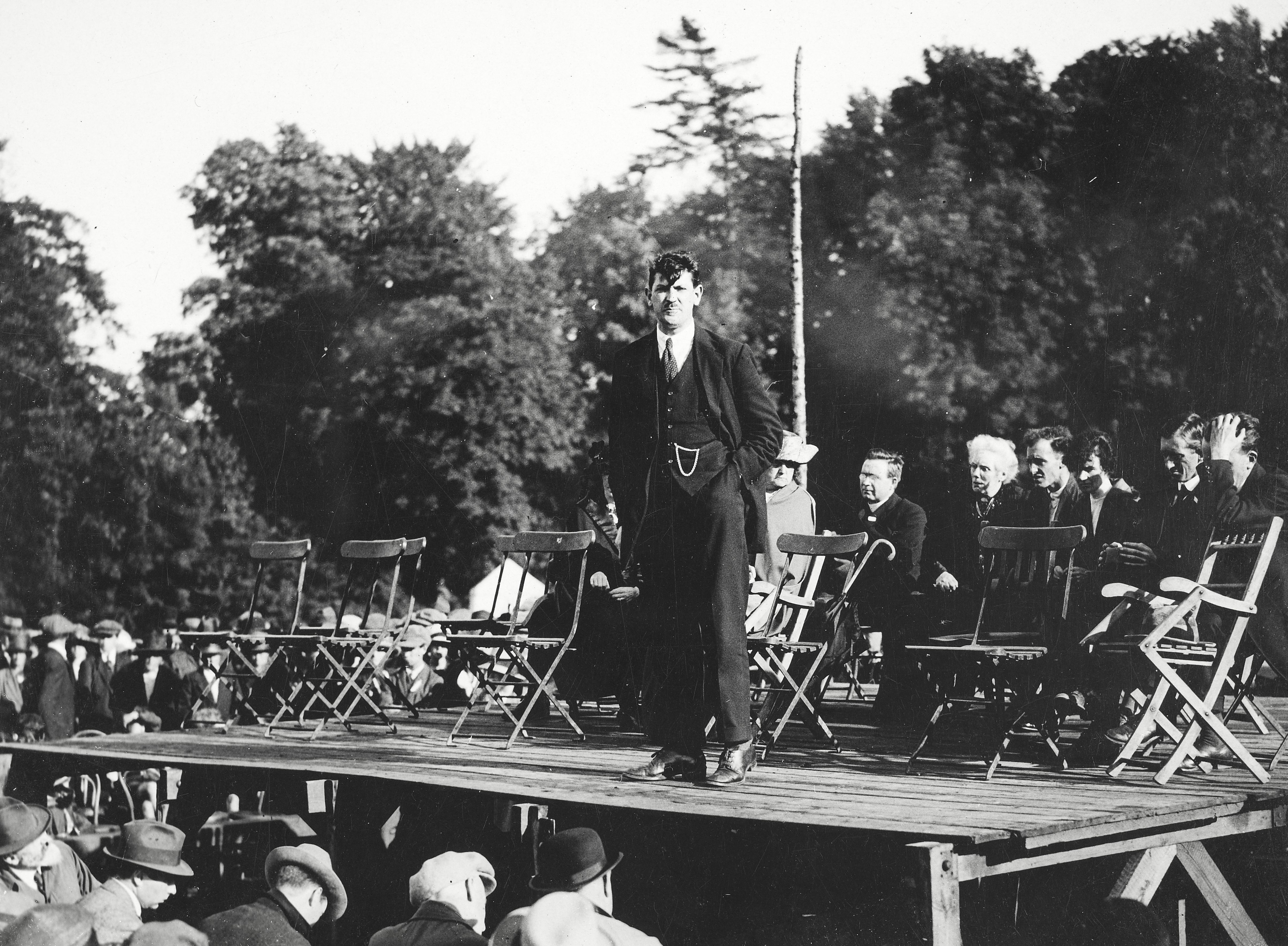
Michael Collins, O'Malley's superior at GHQ

In May 1918, Collins sent O'Malley, who had "less than two years of informal training with the Irish Volunteers" to County Offaly. He was instructed "to hold brigade officer elections and develop a fighting unit in an area seventy-five miles south-west of Dublin". Collins told him to seek out some good men in that county that were "on the run". He arguably escaped capture or death when stopped by an RIC patrol in Philipstown, in the same county, and narrowly avoided having to draw a concealed pistol.

From Athlone, where he was planning to seize the magazine fort, an order from Collins in July sent him to help organise brigades in north and south Roscommon on the border with Galway. The police sought to arrest him and he was twice fired on and wounded. He crossed again to Roscommon and went to ground in the mountains. Using field glasses, O'Malley spied on the Lord Lieutenant, Lord French, at Rockingham House. This could have been hazardous in view of the strong British presence in nearby Carrick-on-Shannon. Night drilling continued in near silence behind village schoolhouses, but in a number of counties secret organising and planning for raids on RIC barracks to seize weaponry went ahead regardless of risk.

O'Malley took responsibility for organising over a dozen areas of the country from 1918 to 1921, even the remote Galway island of Inisheer. In visiting many parts of Ireland, both by bicycle and on foot, O'Malley carried much of what he owned, some 60 lb. weight including his books and notebooks. Hence, he was obliged to be his own military base and commissariat. Nonetheless, he had very little money and was totally reliant on local people for his daily needs, including clothing.

=== Irish Republican Army ===
Although officially a "staff captain" (who reported only to GHQ in Dublin), O'Malley continued to act as an organiser and training officer for rural IRA brigades. This was an important duty: with minimal help from GHQ, he was to train recruits to become an effective local fighting force against a strong military opponent once the war against the British got under way in January 1919. Hence it was vital to master "military technology". O'Malley expressed exasperation at officers generally lacking knowledge and failing to set an example by attending classes for instruction.

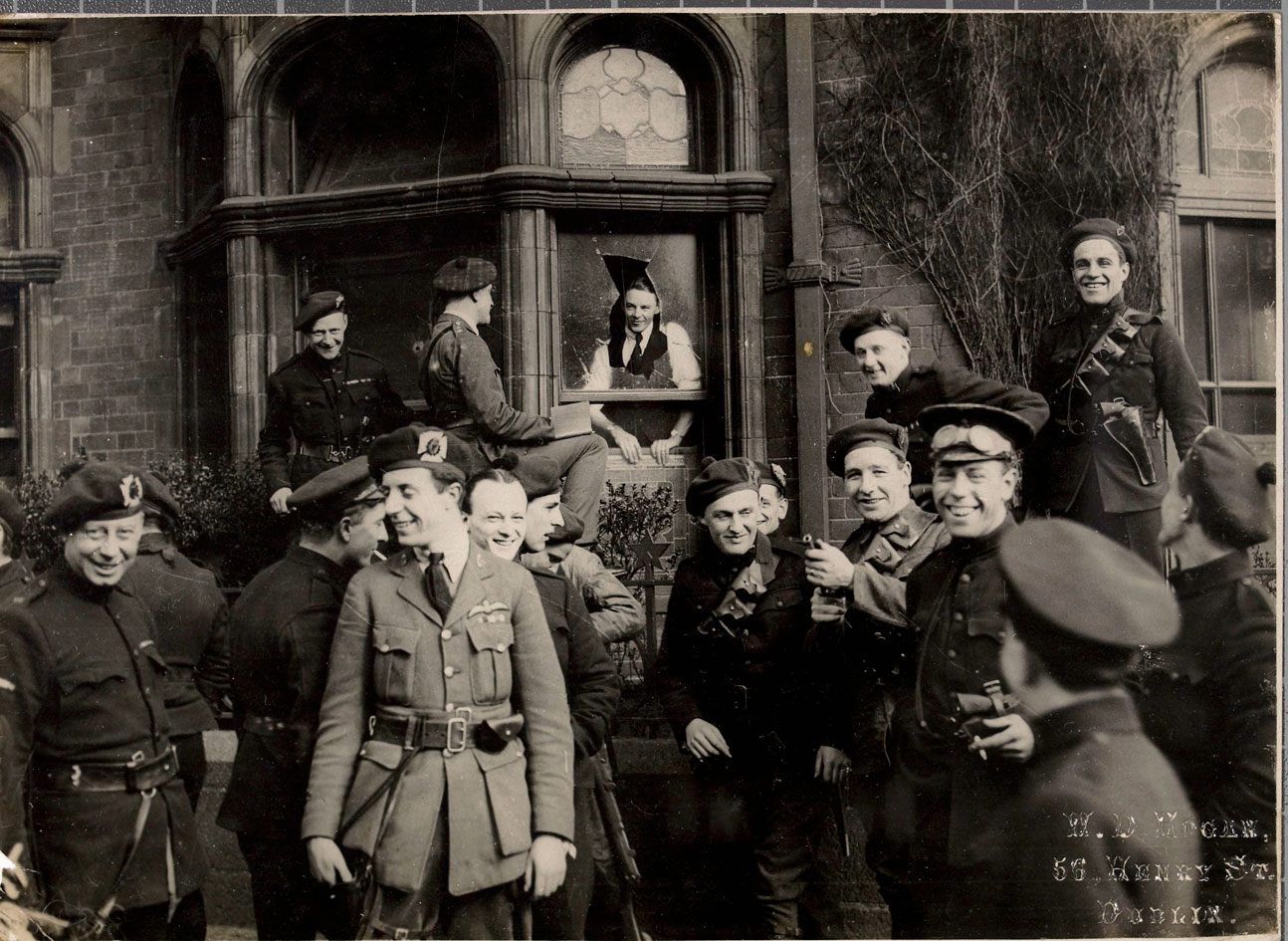
Black and Tans and Auxiliaries in Dublin

In mid-1919, O'Malley found himself in trouble with Collins for administering the new oath of allegiance to the Irish Republic to a company of IRA men in Santry, County Dublin. Collins had shown him the wording of this oath but it had not yet been officially approved by GHQ. While Collins valued O'Malley's work, the latter never overcame the negative initial impression he formed of Collins; nonetheless, his relationship with his superior was one of trust. Collins later sent O'Malley to London, where he once again dressed in British Army uniform to purchase a small number of revolvers and ammunition.

In February 1920, Eoin O'Duffy and O'Malley led an IRA attack on the RIC barracks in Ballytrain, County Monaghan. They were successful in taking it, which was one of the first captures of an RIC barracks in the war. GHQ had developed this strategy in early 1920 to acquire desperately needed arms and ammunition.

In early May, O'Malley was assigned by Collins to the Tipperary area at the request of Séumas Robinson and Seán Treacy. He participated actively in attacks on three RIC barracks: Hollyford (11 May), Drangan (4 June) and Rearcross (12 July). He had his hands burnt by a paraffin fire on the roof of Hollyford barracks; had the wind not changed direction at the very last second at Drangan, he would likely have been burnt alive; and at Rearcross barracks, he was wounded by shrapnel from exploding police hand-grenades and by shots they fired upwards towards the roof. These attacks made him well known as a man of action with leadership qualities. Just before the operation against Drangan, O'Malley had to abort an attack on Sixmilebridge police barracks in nearby County Clare after men commanded by Michael Brennan became overcome by fumes when thawing out gelegnite.

On 27 September, O'Malley and Liam Lynch led the Cork No. 2 Brigade in an attack against the military barracks in Mallow, County Cork. This successful action saw the IRA capture large quantities of firearms and ammunition, partially burning the barracks in the process. In reprisal, soldiers went on a rampage in Mallow the next day.

In October, O'Malley served as a judge in the Republican Courts, recently established to undermine British rule.

==== Capture and escape ====
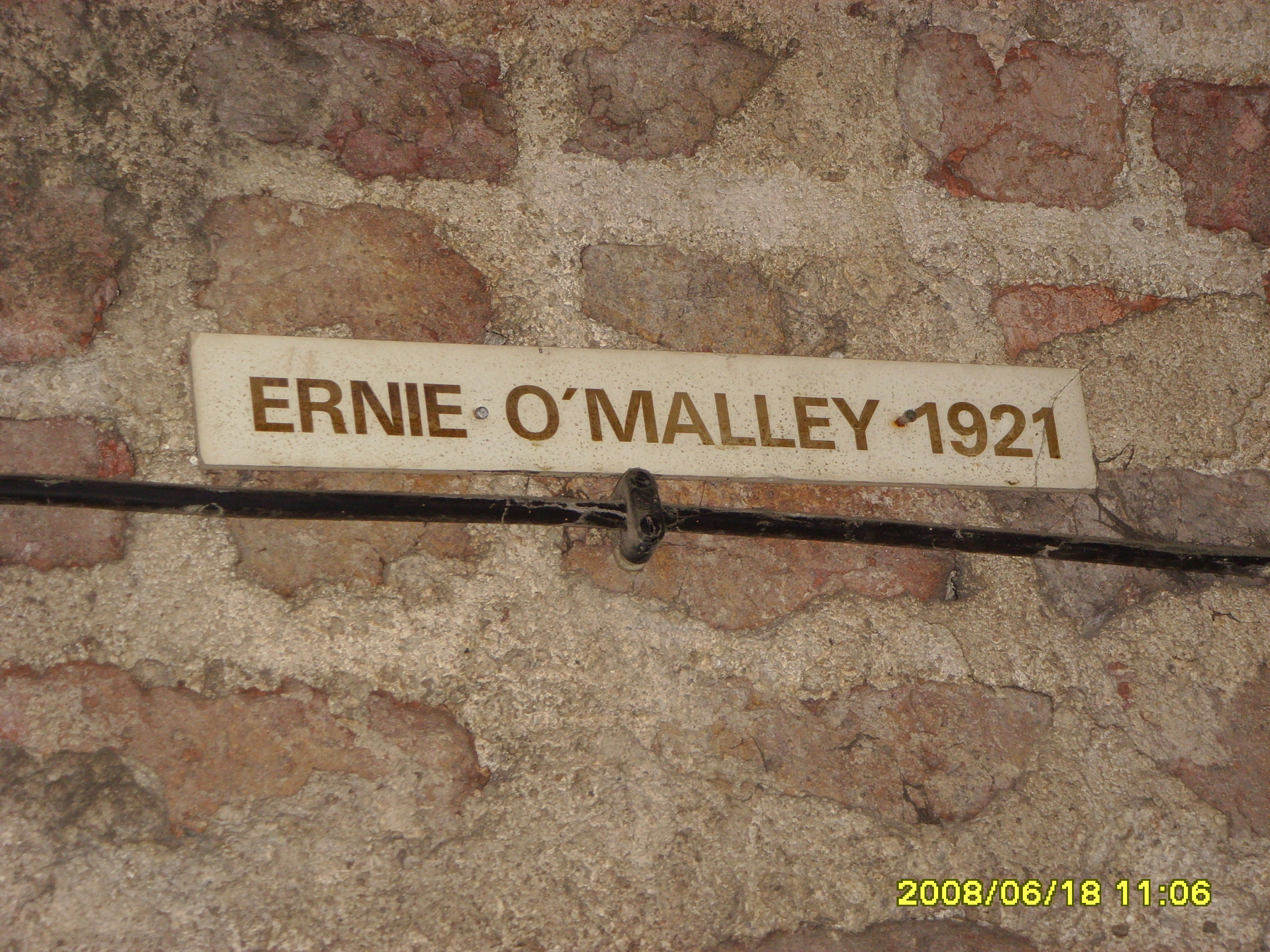
A plaque in O'Malley's cell in Kilmainham Gaol

O'Malley was taken prisoner by Auxiliaries in the home of local IRA commandant James O'Hanrahan at Inistioge, County Kilkenny, on the morning of 9 December 1920. He had been planning an attack on the Auxiliary barracks at Woodstock House, an important base in the south-east of the county that he knew to be well guarded. O'Malley had been given an automatic Webley revolver; however, he was still unfamiliar with this new weapon and could not draw it in time. He had displayed an uncharacteristic lack of care regarding O'Hanrahan's house being a likely British raiding target. Much to O'Malley's disgust, also seized were notebooks containing the names of members of the 7th West Kilkenny Brigade, all of whom were subsequently detained.

On his arrest, he gave his name as "Bernard Stewart". O'Malley's arrest sheet records him as being from Roscommon and in possession of the loaded weapon and four maps. O'Malley endured a mixture of good treatment and violence from his various captors. This included being badly beaten during his interrogation at Dublin Castle where, as a self-confessed IRA volunteer, he was in severe danger of execution following recent high-profile attacks on British forces. By early January 1921, O'Malley was among the first to be imprisoned in Kilmainham Gaol, which had been newly reopened for receipt of political prisoners.

He was held under the name of "Stuart", as recorded by the British. His fellow IRA man Simon Donnelly, who did not recognise O'Malley at first, recorded that this "Mr Stewart" looked different to before and was sporting a large moustache. Newspapers were forbidden there, but he was secretly given a copy of a newspaper article by someone else who knew his real identity. It referred to a recent raid on a flat in Dawson St, Dublin, in which many papers had been taken away and the female occupant (Note: A reference to Eileen McGrane, one of Michael Collins' assistants) of the flat arrested. That flat had been used by Michael Collins, some of whose papers were captured, while O'Malley had documents in a separate room.

The seizure of O'Malley's papers led to a new name of interest to the British. By late January, a letter from Dublin Castle to senior British military authorities referred to an IRA officer, a "notorious rebel" called "E. Malley", whom they were most anxious to arrest in connection with "many attacks on barracks". The letter asked about tracing this man's older brother Frank, then an army officer in East Africa, to see if he could provide information on him.

The IRA leadership feared O'Malley could be executed, for he was one of a number of men regarded as "notorious murderers". However, thanks to a plan devised by Collins he managed to escape from Kilmainham Gaol on 14 February 1921 along with colleagues Frank Teeling and Donnelly. They were aided by two Welsh British Army soldier-guards who had republican sympathies and passed on a bolt-cutter that had been smuggled in.

==== Divisional commandant ====
In spring 1921 O'Malley chaired a stormy meeting near Mallow at which he advised senior Cork figures that GHQ had ordered the formation of the First Southern Division, in Munster. At this gathering Liam Lynch was elected officer commanding of the IRA's largest fighting body. O'Malley was soon summoned to a meeting in Dublin with the President of the Irish Republic Éamon de Valera, Collins and Mulcahy, where he was placed in command of the IRA's Second Southern Division, in Munster, ahead of more senior commanders in that province. With five brigades in Limerick, Kilkenny and Tipperary, it was the second-largest division in the IRA's new structure. As commandant-general of that division, O'Malley, not yet 24, now led more than 7,000 men.

He was to complain that his orders to brigade commandants for a coordinated attack on British forces in mid-May, as part of a wider IRA effort to prevent the execution of captured comrades, had not been carried out. However, on 19 June, his men captured three British Army officers. Citing the continuing execution of IRA prisoners in Cork, O'Malley had the men shot the next day after promising to send their valuables to their comrades.

O'Malley felt that the IRA was winning the war, so he was shocked when news reached him on 9 July that a truce would come into effect two days later. During the truce period in the second half of 1921, O'Malley considered that his state of preparedness for action in the county of Tipperary was getting better every day. O'Malley felt that while the British had control of the cities and towns, the IRA had free rein over the countryside.

The men under O'Malley's command initially thought the truce would only last for a few weeks, although it held as negotiations with the British gradually got underway. O'Malley was suspicious of the truce, but he used this time to work and strengthen his division, which saw visits from senior GHQ staff.

As munitions remained a problem, O'Malley went to London to purchase potassium chlorate for explosives, as well as guns and military equipment; he met Collins during the peace negotiations. While he was there, members of his division had stolen British weapons. This led to a high-level IRA inquiry, as the action represented a breach of the truce and could have imperilled the negotiations. All in all, O'Malley felt that the IRA was still preparing for war.

== Civil war and aftermath ==
=== Opposition to the treaty ===
O'Malley opposed the Anglo-Irish Treaty on the grounds that any settlement falling short of an independent Irish Republic, particularly a settlement backed up by British threats of restarting hostilities, was unacceptable. Moreover, he expressed clear opposition to the "Document No. 2", created by de Valera, which proposed "external association" with the British Empire as an alternative to the treaty. O'Malley offered his resignation as officer commanding the Second Southern Division. Mulcahy, now chief of staff, refused to accept it, telling him that he was "acting prematurely".

O'Malley's outright hostility to the treaty, which was ratified by Dáil Éireann on 7 January 1922, saw his division become the first to secede from GHQ. In mid-January, he informed Mulcahy in person of this decision. O'Malley had a watching brief at meetings of IRA Army Council at this time, in order to ensure the republican agenda was heard. He was not alone in opposing the treaty: a small majority of GHQ staff and divisional commanders, and a larger majority of IRA volunteers, were against it. He is described as acting at that period as one of a number of "virtual warlords in their own areas". Sunday 26 February saw O'Malley lead an attack by the IRA South Tipperary brigade on the RIC barracks in the town of Clonmel, where he had his headquarters. A very large quantity of weapons, including an armoured car, and ammunition were taken. While this led the British government to ask the Provisional Government what measures they were taking to assert their control over Tipperary, the incident is not mentioned in O'Malley's account of what happened to barracks in his area after the treaty. Around this time O'Malley, who had refused to attend staff meetings at GHQ, ignored an order to attend a court martial in Dublin.

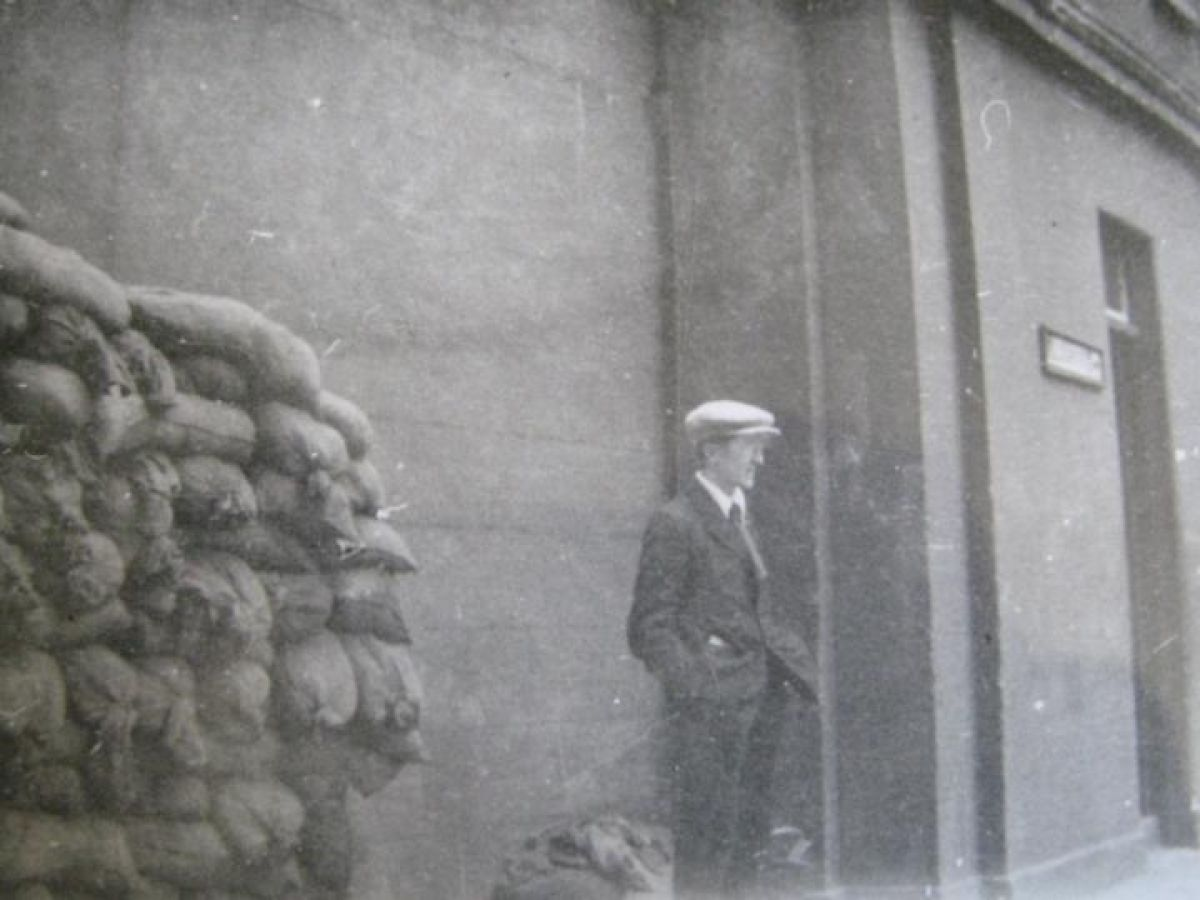
O'Malley outside the Four Courts, April to June 1922

O'Malley was party to early meetings of what became known as the republican "acting military council". That body later established an anti-treaty headquarters staff in which O'Malley became director of organisation and a member of the executive; he was also secretary to the IRA Convention which went ahead on 26 March despite GHQ having banned it. The IRA was now officially split into pro- and anti-treaty camps.

On 14 April, O'Malley was one of the Anti-Treaty IRA officers who occupied the Four Courts in Dublin, an event that helped to widen the split even further prior to the start of the Irish Civil War. In late spring, he seized one of the first armoured cars handed over to local forces by the departing British and brought it from Templemore, County Tipperary, to the Four Courts. O'Malley also repudiated any efforts at compromise with the pro-treaty side, made by some opponents of the treaty. He considered these as an attempt to create a wedge between the Four Courts garrison and the majority of republicans led by Lynch.

After the Four Courts Executive was established, O'Malley's deputy in operations was future Nobel Peace Prize recipient Seán MacBride. However, O'Malley relied primarily on his assistant Todd Andrews. Even in late June O'Malley was planning an attack on Northern Ireland and sent Todd to Cavan to meet local IRA commandant Paddy Smith. On 26 June, he suggested and carried out the kidnapping of Free State assistant chief of staff, J. J. "Ginger" O'Connell, and kept him prisoner in the Four Courts.

=== Outbreak of civil war ===
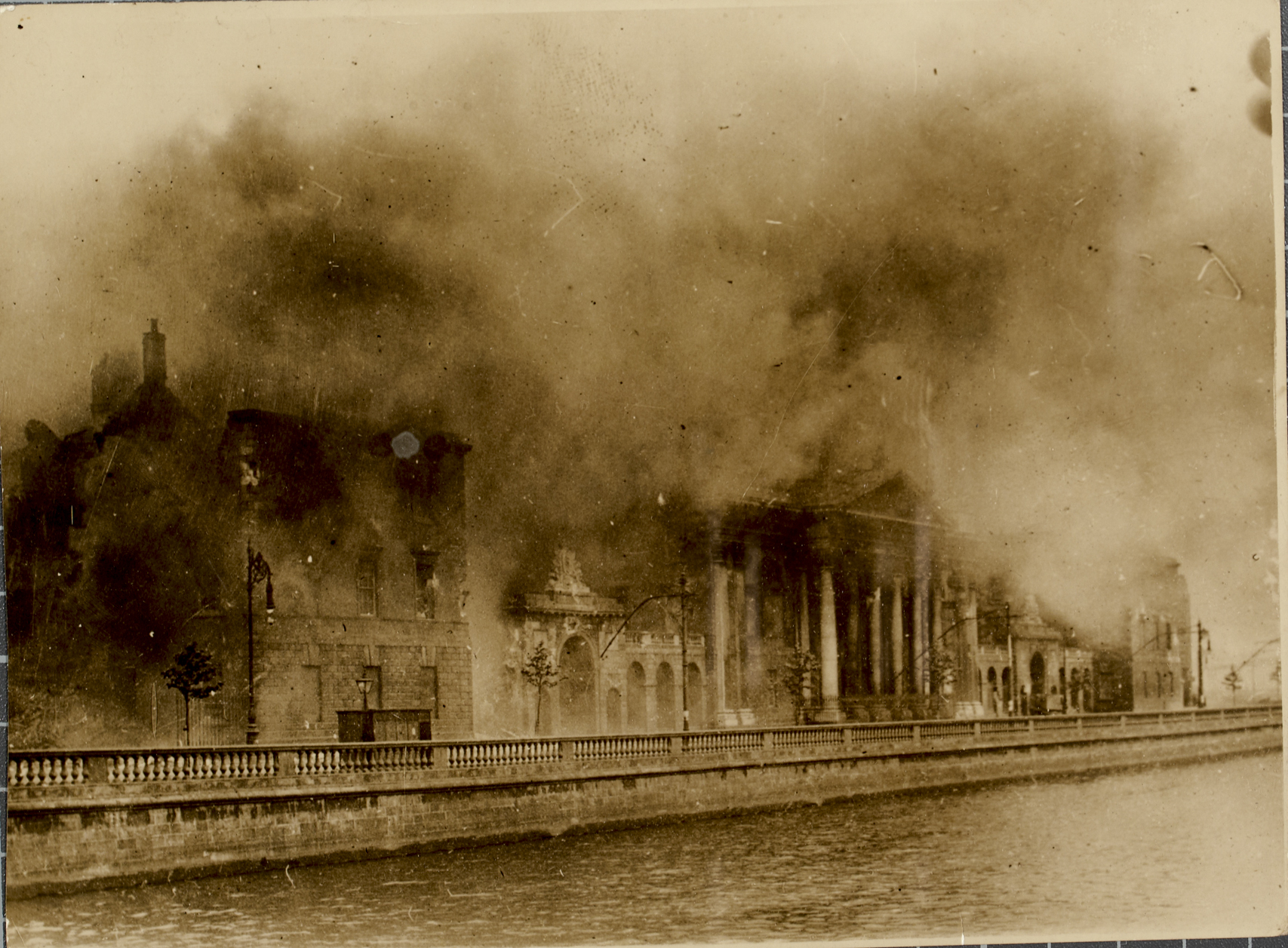
The Four Courts explosion

On 28 June 1922, government forces shelled the Four Courts. O'Malley was in the building when the Records Office was blown up during the advance by Free State troops on 30 June. The explosion cost him all the notes and manuals on training and tactics he had compiled and revised several times. Of that day he wrote in The Singing Flame:

As we stood near the gate there was a loud shattering explosion … The munitions block and a portion of Headquarters block went up in flames and smoke … The yard was littered with chunks of masonry and smouldering records; pieces of white paper were gyrating in the upper air like seagulls. The explosion seemed to give an extra push to roaring orange flames which formed patterns across the sky. Fire was fascinating to watch; it had a spell like running water. Flame sang and conducted its own orchestra simultaneously. It can't be long now, I thought, until the real noise comes.

A national army report claimed that O'Malley later informed Free State general Paddy O'Daly that the IRA had set off a mine inside the records office and that he was sorry more national army soldiers had not been injured.

O'Malley, who assumed operational command of the Four Courts occupation after garrison commander Paddy O'Brien was injured by shrapnel, was ordered by his senior IRA commanders – over his objections – to surrender to the Free State Army on the afternoon of 30 June. He was to have led a break-out but it did not come off: "By then to emerge would have been suicide". That evening he escaped from temporary captivity in the Jameson Distillery along with Seán Lemass and two others. The next day he travelled via the Wicklow Mountains to Blessington, then to County Wexford and finally to County Carlow. This escape probably saved O'Malley's life, as four of the other senior Four Courts leaders were later executed.

A force led by O'Malley captured Enniscorthy but this action cost the life of his comrade O'Brien and the IRA was forced to abandon much of County Wexford and south-east Leinster.

==== Assistant chief of staff ====
On 10 July 1922, O'Malley was made acting assistant chief of staff and was later appointed to the IRA army council. He was second-in-command to Liam Lynch, who had been confirmed as IRA chief of staff when the split in republican ranks was healed on 27 June. He was also appointed as head of the Eastern and Northern Command, covering the provinces of Ulster and Leinster. O'Malley was disenchanted with being placed over areas he did not know well, instead of going to the west or south where his fighting experience would be put to much better use.

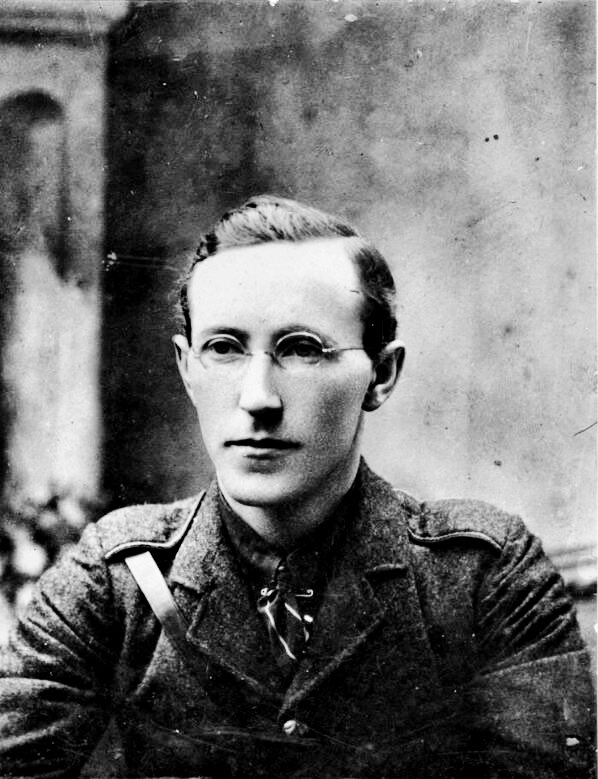
Liam Lynch, IRA Chief of Staff

In September 1922, O'Malley pressed Lynch to implement Liam Mellows' proposed 10-Point Programme for the IRA, which would have seen it adopt communist policies in an attempt to secure support from left-wing elements in Ireland. However, even if O'Malley thought highly of Mellows, there is nothing in his civil war-focused writings to indicate that he supported the Communist thrust of Mellows' programme. (Note: With reference to Mellows in The Singing Flame and "No Surrender Here!", there is nothing to indicate that O'Malley was in favour of his ideas. Further, O'Connor (p. 127) notes that the Communist Party of Ireland claimed three important new converts at this time, namely Mellows, McKelvey and Peadar O'Donnell, but no mention is made of O'Malley. While O'Malley may have discussed buying weapons from the USSR with two left-leaning IRA volunteers, the IRA Executive rejected formal links with Communists)

During an inspection of the North, O'Malley was in South Armagh in October. He joined Frank Aiken (commander of the IRA's 4th Northern Division) and Pádraig Ó Cuinn (quartermaster-general) for a planned assault on Free State positions in Dundalk. This operation was designed to rescue IRA men imprisoned after earlier attacks launched by Aiken but it turned out to be abortive.

O'Malley was forced to live a clandestine existence in Dublin city, where Madge Clifford of Cumann na mBan was his full-time secretary and "adjutant", and had to build up a new headquarters command staff. Moreover, effective military operations in the city were few and far between: O'Malley felt his men there lacked the spirit to carry out his orders and he considered himself a glorified clerk. From the start, he was frustrated at being cooped up and seeing no action. Todd Andrews recorded that O'Malley hated being shut up in Dublin and would have excelled as a field commander.

Lack of contact with Lynch was also a major problem: following a meeting of the IRA Executive on 15 July, none was held until 16–17 October. At that meeting Lynch informed O'Malley, to his relief, that he would be moving IRA GHQ to Dublin and giving O'Malley command in the west; however, this did not happen. O'Malley also believed that Lynch's strategy of holding a defensive line in the south and locating GHQ in County Cork made no sense: a concerted attack on Dublin should have been an early priority. This lack of ambition, he argued, demoralised both the IRA and its supporters, and it allowed the "Staters" (the Free State Army) to build up their strength in preparation for a gradual take-over of areas of the country dominated by "Irregulars" (the IRA).

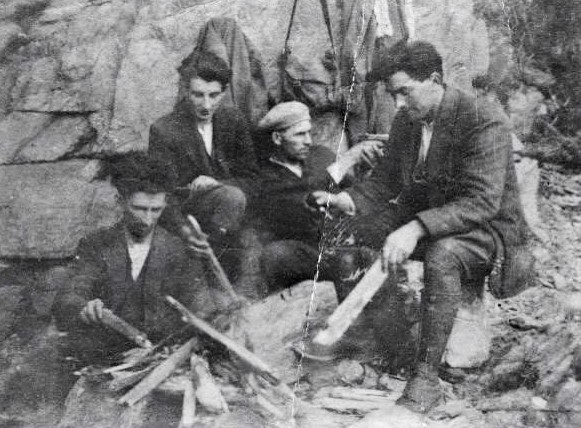
Anti-Treaty IRA men in Co. Waterford

O'Malley expressed the view that, to win the war, guerrilla tactics were insufficient. Rather, the anti-treaty side needed to use more conventional warfare, with larger columns to drive the enemy out of towns and villages. He told Lynch that the destruction of communications, unless part of an immediate military operation, was folly, as it discouraged a fighting spirit. An uncoordinated struggle of scattered attrition, he wrote, was certain to lead to defeat.

In late October, O'Malley issued an order that the names of all enemy officers or soldiers who had ill-treated prisoners or been party of Free State "murder gangs" were to be circulated to IRA units with a shoot-on-sight instruction. Among three generals named was Emmet Dalton, who, ironically, had been a schoolmate of O'Malley's.

==== Capture ====
On 4 November 1922, O'Malley was captured after a shoot-out with Free State soldiers at the family home of Nell O'Rahilly Humphreys, 36 Ailesbury Road, in the Donnybrook area of Dublin, which had been his headquarters for six weeks. He was severely wounded in the incident, being hit over nine times. A Free State soldier was also killed in the gunfight. Anno O'Rahilly, who lived in the house, was accidentally shot by O'Malley during the raid but survived. He was kept in Portobello military hospital, where Free State army chief of staff Seán MacMahon visited him in a private capacity. O'Malley was too ill to recognise the enemy general but learnt later that MacMahon had expressed a hope that O'Malley would not die.

Still severely affected by his wounds, O'Malley was transferred from Portobello to Mountjoy Prison hospital on 23 December 1922. As he made clear in The Singing Flame, he was in grave danger of being one of the many executed for armed insurrection against the state and, additionally in his case, for killing a soldier. O'Malley believed that the authorities were waiting for him to recover sufficiently for an "elaborate trial" to take place, a scenario in which he would refuse to recognise the court. Charges were preferred against him in January 1923.

Another republican prisoner, Peadar O'Donnell, recorded that it was only the intervention of O'Malley's doctors – who insisted that the prisoner was too ill even to be tried – that had saved him from a court martial and firing squad. O'Malley even wrote what he thought would be his final letter to Lynch.

However, no trial was held: there appeared to be official reservations about the reaction to shooting a man who would have to be carried to execution on a stretcher. This concern was likely heightened by inquiries about O'Malley made by prominent Americans and the publication in the Irish newspapers, The Times and the New York Times, in January 1923, of reports about his severe condition.

By February 1923, despite letters to the contrary, he felt that the anti-treaty side had been beaten since before Christmas, in which regard he acknowledged his own failure.

O'Malley's most important external contact from prison was his friend the American-born Irish nationalist Molly Childers, wife of Erskine who was executed soon after O'Malley's arrest. The two corresponded on many topics, with Childers sending O'Malley all kinds of goods and food parcels.

==== Hunger strike ====
The civil war ended with the cessation of hostilities and dumping of arms in May 1923, but most IRA prisoners were not released until much later. On 13 October, O'Malley and many others in Mountjoy Prison went on hunger strike for forty-one days, in protest at the continued detention of IRA prisoners (see 1923 Irish Hunger Strikes). After seven days O'Malley and the other senior officers (Note: Despite his incarceration, O'Malley had officially become assistant chief of staff on 8 December 1922 following the execution of Joe McKelvey (O'Malley and Dolan, "No Surrender Here!", p. 346)) or elected members were moved to Kilmainham Gaol. Against his will, he had been nominated as a Sinn Féin candidate for Dublin North at the 1923 general election held on 27 August and was elected as a TD. O'Malley "hated" being a member of the Dáil. Cognisant of the propaganda value of commemorating the anniversaries of the first men to be executed, in late November O’Malley ordered every man to "educate himself and those around him to do all that is necessary to complete the work for which his comrades died".

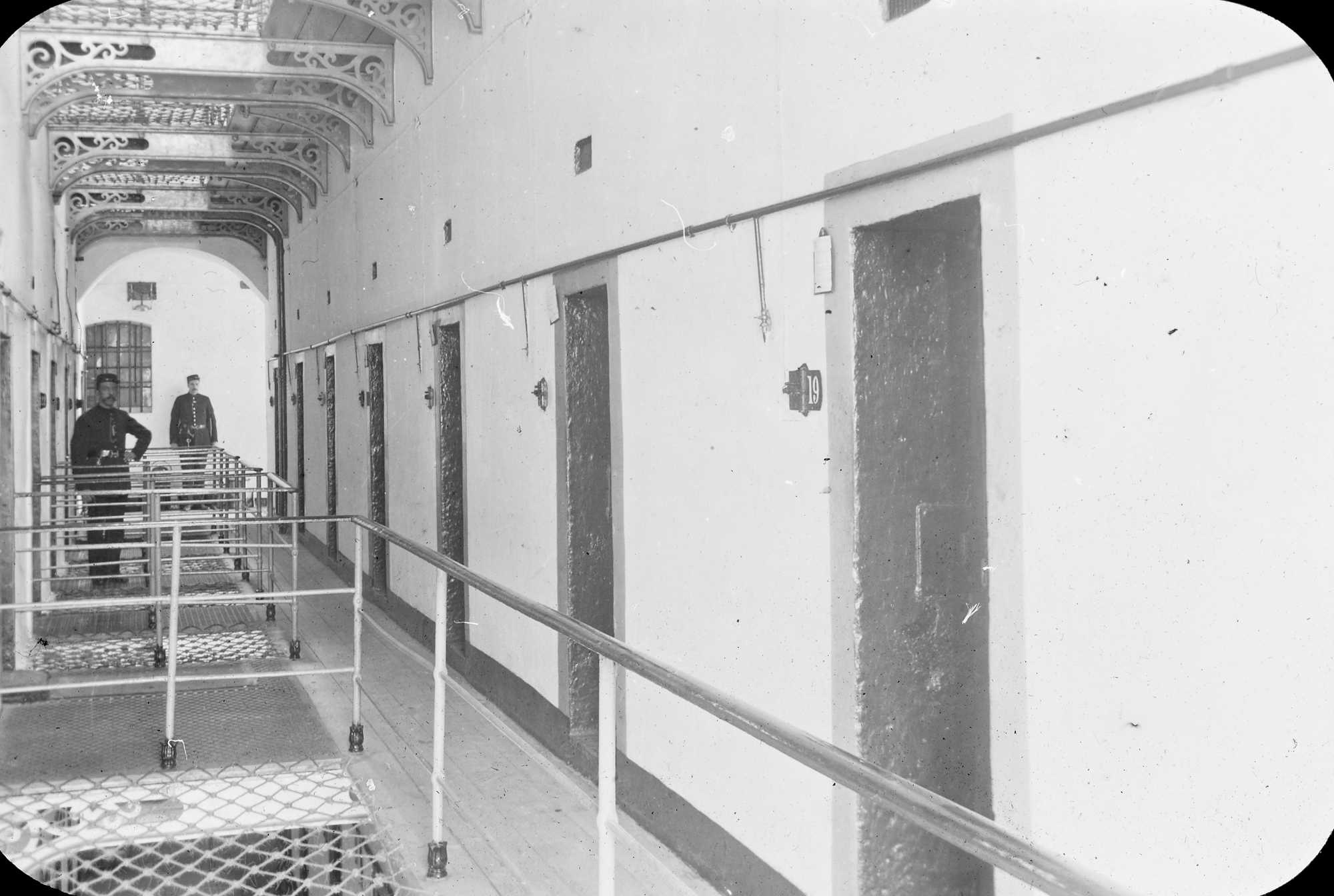
A corridor in Kilmainham Gaol

By 11 January 1924, O'Malley had been the last anti-treaty inmate moved from Kilmainham Gaol. He was transferred to St Bricin's military hospital, thence to Mountjoy Prison where at first he spent some time in the hospital wing. Then came a move to the Curragh army camp hospital in late winter before he joined the other anti-treaty prisoners in the huts of the Curragh Camp. By mid-1924, the Free State government heard strong calls in parliament for the release of the final 600-odd anti-treaty prisoners, in the interests of restoring a more normal state of affairs. Further pressure came from the organisers of the Tailteann Games, which were expected to be attended in early August by tens of thousands of overseas visitors.

Despite official reservations, the prisoners began to be set free. His period of internment complete, O'Malley was the very last anti-treaty prisoner to be released. He left the Curragh, along with Seán Russell, on 17 July 1924, well over a year after the end of hostilities.

==== Personal cost ====
During the civil war, three of O'Malley's younger brothers, Cecil, Paddy and Kevin, were arrested by Free State troops in July 1922. Another younger brother, Charlie, also anti-treaty, was killed on 4 July 1922 in Sackville Street during the Battle of Dublin. In all, O'Malley suffered more than a dozen wounds from 1916 to 1923. Despite this high personal cost partition was becoming entrenched and he had failed in his principal aim of an Ireland free from foreign interference.

==== Secretary to IRA Executive ====
Upon his release, O'Malley went to his parents' home in Dublin and acted as he had before leaving home over six years previously. He also stayed with Count Plunkett. Despite its defeat the IRA was still in existence. He became secretary to its executive and attended a meeting of that body on 10–11 August 1924 at which de Valera and almost all the IRA hierarchy were present. O'Malley was one of a sub-committee of five appointed to act as an army council to the executive. He also proposed a motion, passed unanimously, that IRA members must refuse to recognise courts in the Free State or Six Counties for charges relating to actions committed during the war or to political activities since then. Further, a legal defence would only be permitted if the death penalty might be imposed. Yet his military career was over and he remained aloof from politics. O'Malley stayed with Sinn Féin and did not join Fianna Fáil in 1926, nor did he contest the June 1927 general election.

== Subsequent life ==
=== Europe ===
O'Malley left Ireland in February 1925 and spent 18 months travelling in Europe and Morocco to improve his health. He used the alias 'Cecil Edward Smyth-Howard' and secured a British passport in that name. To finance his trip, he had raised some £300 in gifts and loans from sources in Ireland.

While abroad in the 1920s, O'Malley established connections with the Basque and Catalan nationalists, becoming acquainted with Francesc Macià, leader of the Catalan nationalist group Estat Català. Seán MacBride, then living in Paris, was made aware that O'Malley was known to French intelligence as a "chief military adviser to Colonel Macià", who was then in exile in Paris. O'Malley likewise appears to have liaised with Basque nationalists around this same period, as they were planning a rebellion in tandem with that of the Catalans. O'Malley was one of two Irish republicans, the other being Ambrose Victor Martin, to have cooperated with the Basque and Catalan nationalists resident in Paris, then exiled from the Spanish dictatorship of Miguel Primo de Rivera. Peadar O'Donnell stated that the IRA Army Council had given the go-ahead for O'Malley to speak to those seeking an independent Catalonia.

The following excerpt from a letter from O'Malley to Harriet Monroe, dated 10 January 1935, provides an autobiographical summary of the years 1925–1926:

I went to Catalonia to help the Catalan movement for independence; I studied their folklore and cultural institutions. I learned to walk again in the Pyrénées. I became a good mountain climber, covered the frontier from San Sebastian to Perpignan, lived in the Basque country. I walked through a part of Spain, southern and South East France and most of Italy. I did some mediaeval history at Grenoble. I walked through Italy slowly, worked at archeology in Sicily and lived in Rome and Florence for a time. I walked through Germany to Holland and through Belgium and then to North Africa. After some years I returned to the National University to again take up medicine but I did not get my exams. The years abroad taught me to use my eyes in a new way.

=== North America ===
O'Malley returned to University College Dublin to continue his medical studies in October 1926, but these did not progress well. He was heavily involved in the university hill-walking club and its literary and historical societies; along with literary friends, he founded the college Dramatic Society in spring 1928.

He left Ireland again in October 1928 without graduating. For eight months in 1928 and 1929, he and Frank Aiken toured the east and west coasts of the USA on behalf of de Valera's plan to raise funds for the establishment of the new, independent pro-republican newspaper, The Irish Press. O'Malley considered a newspaper that would articulate the anti-treaty position an important development. That fund-raising effort was successful: the newspaper was published and flourished for many years.

O'Malley spent the next few years based in New Mexico, Mexico and New York. In September 1929, he arrived in Taos, New Mexico. He lived among the literary and artistic community there and close to the Native American pueblo of Taos. He began work on his account of his military experiences that would later become On Another Man's Wound. At that time he fell in with Mabel Dodge Luhan, Dorothy Brett and Irish poet Ella Young. In May 1930, he moved to Santa Fe, where he gave lectures on Irish culture, history and literature. A figure of particular interest was James Joyce, whose Ulysses was to influence the presentation of On Another Man's Wound.

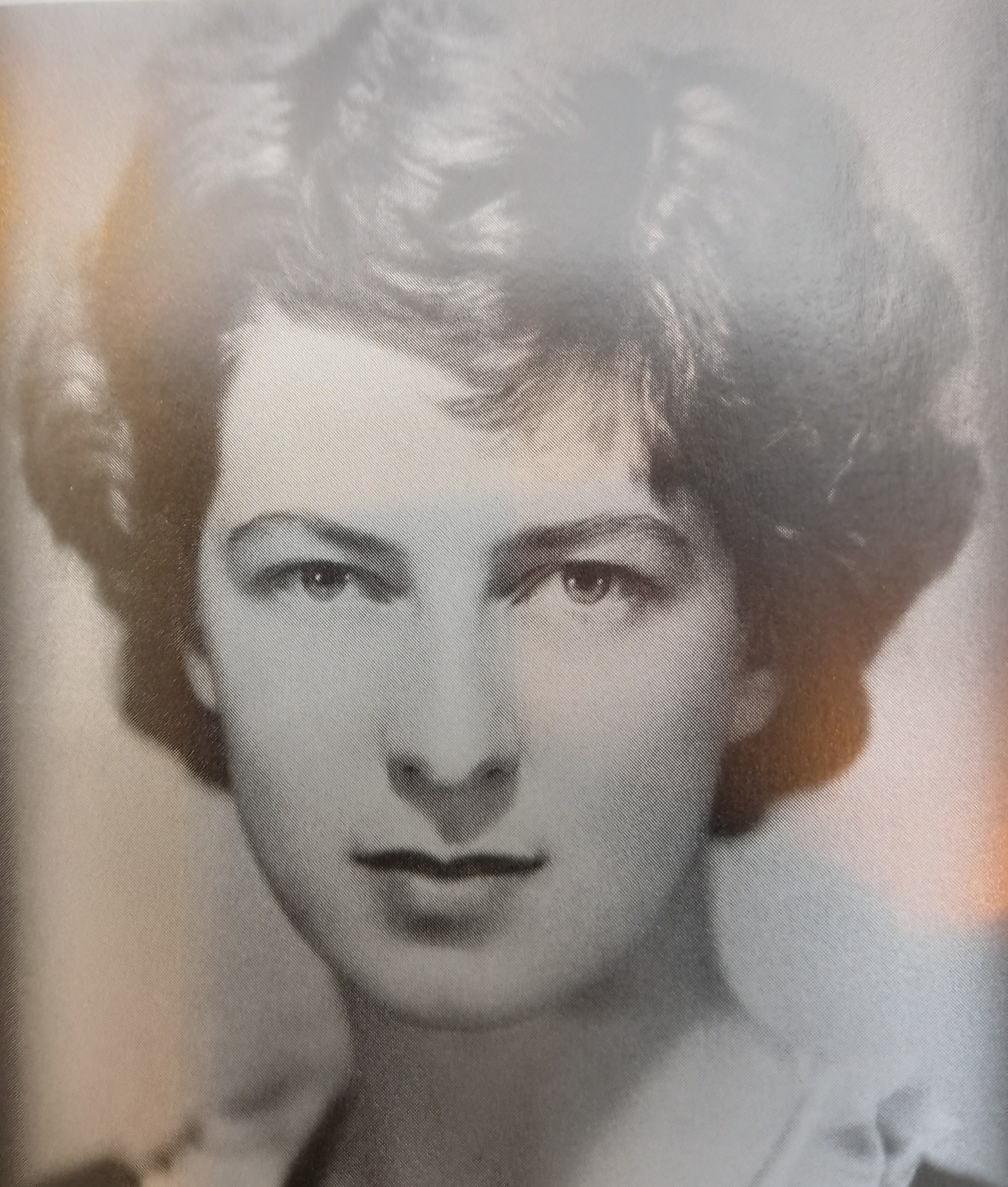
Helen Hooker, c. 1925

In 1931, he travelled to Mexico for eight months observing its culture and artists. However, he failed to secure employment there as he had hoped. His US visa having expired, he reputedly swam across the Rio Grande to return to Santa Fe. From late 1931 to June 1932, O'Malley worked in Taos as a tutor to the children of Helen Golden, widow of leading New York Irish nationalist Peter Golden; when she was hospitalised in early 1932, O'Malley looked after the children. During this period he became good friends with photographer Paul Strand. In June 1932, he travelled to New York, where in 1933 he met 28 year old Helen Hooker, a wealthy young sculptor and gifted tennis player, whom he was later to marry.

=== Return to Ireland ===
In 1934, O'Malley was granted a wound and war pension of approximately £330 a year (Note: The equivalent amount in winter 2024 is approximately £29,500) by the Fianna Fáil government for his service in the War of Independence. Academic Marie Coleman believes that he was treated generously – compared to others – despite not having become a member of the Irish Volunteers until several months after the Easter Rising. In June of that year, it was noted in the Dáil that he was rumoured to be coming back into public life as chief of staff of the Volunteer Force created by the government in April. While remaining out of political life, he later convened a meeting of anti-Franco Irish republicans when most people in Ireland supported Franco in the Spanish Civil War.

Now possessed of a steady income, he married Hooker in London on 27 September 1935, before he returned to Ireland to resume his medical studies. The O'Malleys had three children, all born in Dublin: Cathal (a son, 1936), Etain (a daughter, 1940) and Cormac (a son, 1942). The family divided its time between Dublin and Burrishoole, Newport, County Mayo. Hooker and O'Malley devoted themselves to the arts: she was involved in sculpture, photography and theatre, while he pursued a career in history and the arts as a writer. Jack Butler Yeats was amongst his friends and the art collection O'Malley assembled was later to sell for over €5.4 million. Not long after his return to Ireland O'Malley became a member of the Royal Society of Antiquities of Ireland to further his interest in folklore. He remained in neutral Ireland during World War II and offered his services to his local defence force in Mayo but was not accepted. This was likely on account of his poor health: he had also farmed in Burrishole from 1940 to 1944 and was worn out. O'Malley got to know the members of his family again, many of whom had distinguished careers during and after the war.

In September 1944, the family moved to Clonskeagh, Dublin, although Helen was often absent. By the end of the war years the O'Malleys' marriage had begun to fail. In summer 1945, Helen O'Malley went to America for six months to see her family and thereafter began to spend more time away from her husband and children. This period included a year in London in 1946–1947. After 1948 she returned to the United States. In 1950, Helen took her two elder children out of Coláiste na Rinne, an Irish-language boarding school at Ring, County Waterford. She flew them to the States to live with her. The youngest child was not at school and thus stayed with his father. This incident was referred to as a "kidnapping". Helen divorced her husband in 1952.

In the late 1940s and early 1950s, he carried out and compiled a written record of hundreds of interviews with veterans of the war against the British and the fratricidal struggle that followed it. Planned since the late 1930s, it began to take shape in 1945 when O'Malley consulted Florrie O'Donoghue about the latter's idea of collecting Tan War memories. O'Malley's work, written in a colloquial style in notebooks, was mostly complete by autumn 1950, though it continued on and off until early 1954. His civil war interviews were mainly, but not exclusively, with anti-treaty veterans.

In 1951, O'Malley acted as a special adviser to John Ford on the set of The Quiet Man (1952) and the two became firm friends.

=== Illness and death ===
Throughout his life, O'Malley endured considerable ill-health from the wounds and hardship he had suffered during his revolutionary days. His main weakness, however, was a heart condition that started in childhood. His brother Kevin, a heart specialist, took care of him in later years, especially after O'Malley suffered a serious heart attack in spring 1953. In August 1954, O'Malley moved with his son Cormac to a flat in Dublin to have easier access to a hospital and be closer to brother Kevin. During the summers of 1954 to 1956 O'Malley and his son spent time on the Aran Islands, where the ailing republican gathered local folklore and information on fishing.

Ernie O'Malley died at 9.20 a.m. on Monday 25 March 1957 at his sister Kaye's home in Howth. Contrary to his wishes, he was given a state funeral by the newly elected Fianna Fáil government. It was attended by many of the deceased's comrades from all over Ireland, including President Seán T. O'Kelly, de Valera, Lemass, Aiken and Dan Breen. While O'Malley's ex-wife, children and brothers looked on, Sean Moylan delivered the graveside oration: "There wasn't a corner of Ireland where a soldier of Ireland's revolutionary period survived that the name of Commandant-General Ernie O'Malley would not evoke proud memories, not a place where patriotism was honoured that would not sorrow at his death. He was fortunate, Ireland was fortunate in his being born into a period of Irish history where his special gifts, his soldierly qualities could be used to the greatest effect ... The Ireland of his generation was not lacking in men of high purpose, deep sincerity and courage ... among them, Ernie O'Malley had pride of place".

== Legacy ==
O'Malley remains an important figure in a "fractious period" of 20th-century Irish history. Roy Foster observed: "What remains striking about O'Malley's legacy is not only his creation of one of the most remarkable memoirs in Irish literary history, but also the story of the journey of a deeply original and powerful intelligence, coping with the fallout of an extraordinary youth and a saddened middle age". O'Malley firmly believed that Ireland, having been dominated by an occupying power for so long, deserved to rule itself. Achieving that aim was the sole, almost overwhelming, focus of his early adult years. He contributed significantly to making IRA volunteers, often poorly armed, into a formidable guerrilla force. Lemass considered him an exceptional military field commander. However, he decried O'Malley's utility as a strategist at HQ albeit with the civil war already lost to the republicans by then. Tom Barry, who was passed over for the divisional command given to O'Malley, felt that the latter paid too much heed to the military manual.

Todd Andrews stated that O'Malley had "taken part in more attacks on British soldiers, Black and Tans and RIC than any other IRA men in Ireland"; yet while admired, he was not generally liked. O'Malley's good friend Tony Woods, who had been in the Four Courts, disapproved of The Singing Flame (which he incorrectly attributed to Frances-Mary Blake) and considered O'Malley "only a third-rate general". Máire Comerford believed that the civil war would not have been lost by the anti-treaty side if all IRA men had been like O'Malley. Simon Donnelly considered him "Without doubt one of the bravest soldiers who ever fought for Irish independence".

O'Malley was uncomfortable with being addressed as "General" once he ceased being a soldier or "gunman", a term he later did not disapprove of. While he had fought his opponents in the struggle for independence and during the civil war, and retained his uncompromising republican beliefs until the day he died, he bore no ill will towards anyone in his later years. He may have felt that he was "hated thoroughly" by the men he had trained, on account of the demands he had made of them. Yet he did not spare himself: when he died in 1957, five of the many bullets he had received in numerous actions remained in his body.

O'Malley's literary output, as well as the research he undertook in his later years, resulted in his being portrayed as the "historian of the resistance". One author claims that O'Malley, in writing in The Singing Flame about nationalist defeats of old, the failure to defeat the Free State feeling as raw to republicans as any previous reverse and a fondness amongst his fellow captives for old ballads, was likening the departure of republicans from Ireland ("released prisoners crowded to the United States") to the Flight of the Wild Geese; however, O'Malley did not use that specific term. O'Malley's work filled a gap the historiography of the Irish revolutionary period that mostly overlooked the activities of local leaders and their men. In that regard, his voluminous civil war output is both accurate and "unrivalled". His memoirs are the main inspiration behind the Ken Loach 2006 film The Wind that Shakes the Barley and the character of Damien Donovan is based loosely on O'Malley. A sculpture of Manannán mac Lir, donated in his memory by Helen Hooker, stands in the Mall in Castlebar, County Mayo. A 2007 proposal to rename a road in Castlebar in O'Malley's honour was strongly supported by local residents but rejected by town councillors. Despite O'Malley's appreciation of the arts, Todd Andrews did not consider him an intellectual.

A documentary film on O'Malley's life, On Another Man's Wound: Scéal Ernie O'Malley ("Ernie O'Malley's Story"), was made for TG4 by Jerry O'Callaghan in 2008. A Call to Arts, a documentary about the artistic journey of Helen Hooker and Ernie O'Malley, was produced by Cormac O'Malley and directed by Chris Kepple in 2020. It was shown on Connecticut Public Television (2020) and RTÉ (2021).

Several scholarships and awards exist jointly to honour the cultural legacy of O'Malley and his wife. The University of Limerick in 2026 established the O'Malley Fellowship, for an American scholar, as a "vital investment in advancing Irish Studies at an international level". This biannual fellowship is supported by the Irish American Cultural Institute (IACI). In 1989, IACI created the O'Malley Art Award, a biennial bursary open to persons resident in Ireland. New York University's Tamiment Library established the O'Malley Research Travel Grant in 2019 for students to undertake research in the archives of Irish America at NYU.

There is a small museum, housing some of O'Malley's stamp and coin collection, in an Irish pub named in his honour in the Kips Bay neighborhood of Manhattan, New York City.

== Works ==
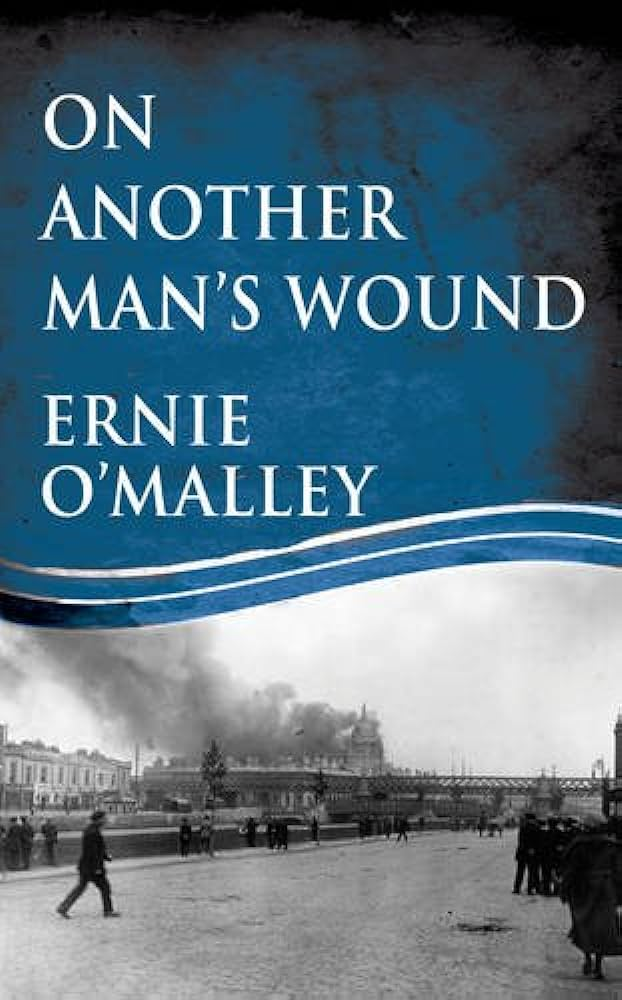
Cover of O'Malley's memoir on the Irish War of Independence (Mercier Press, 2012)

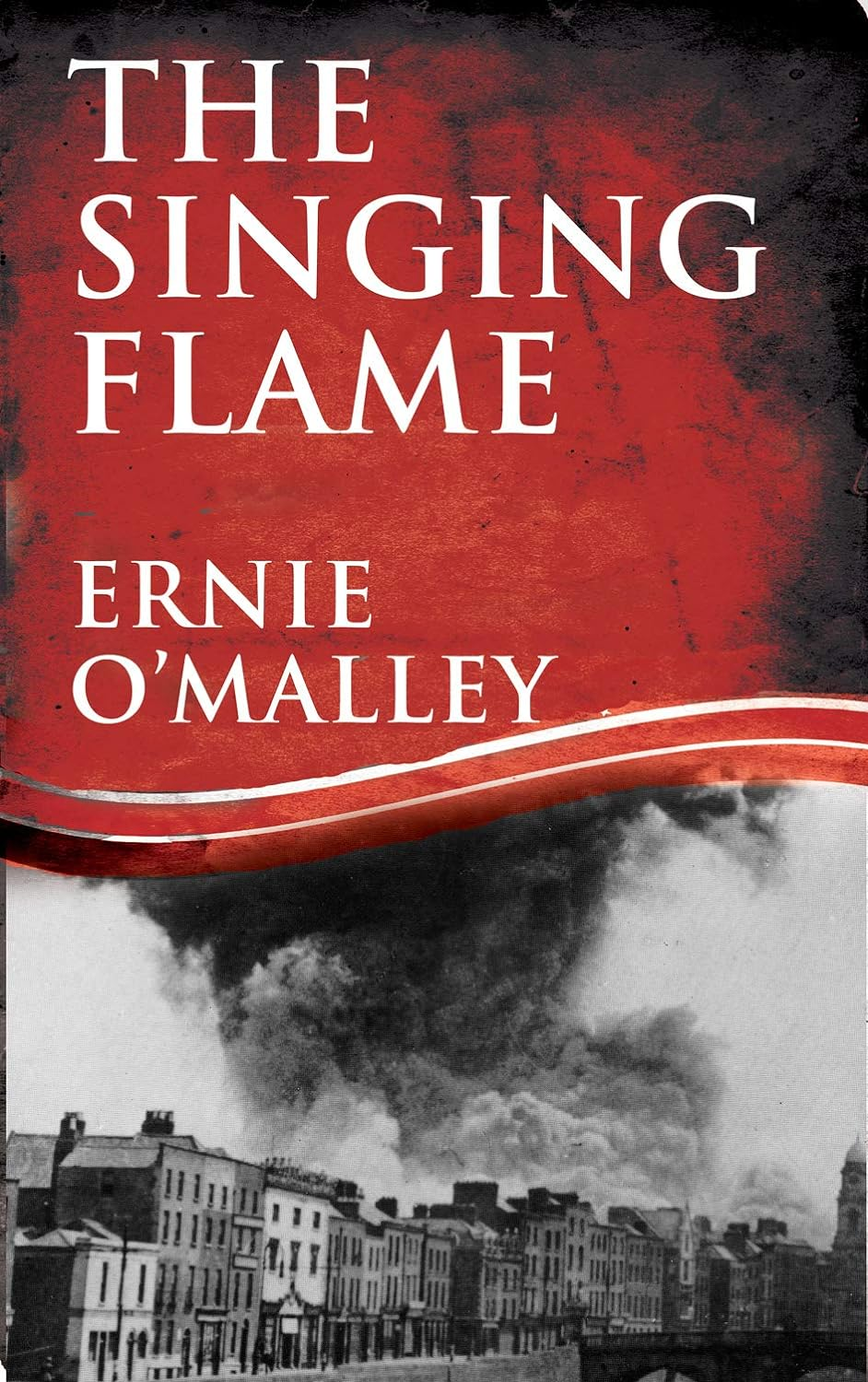
Cover of O'Malley's memoir on the Truce and Civil War period (Mercier Press, 2012)

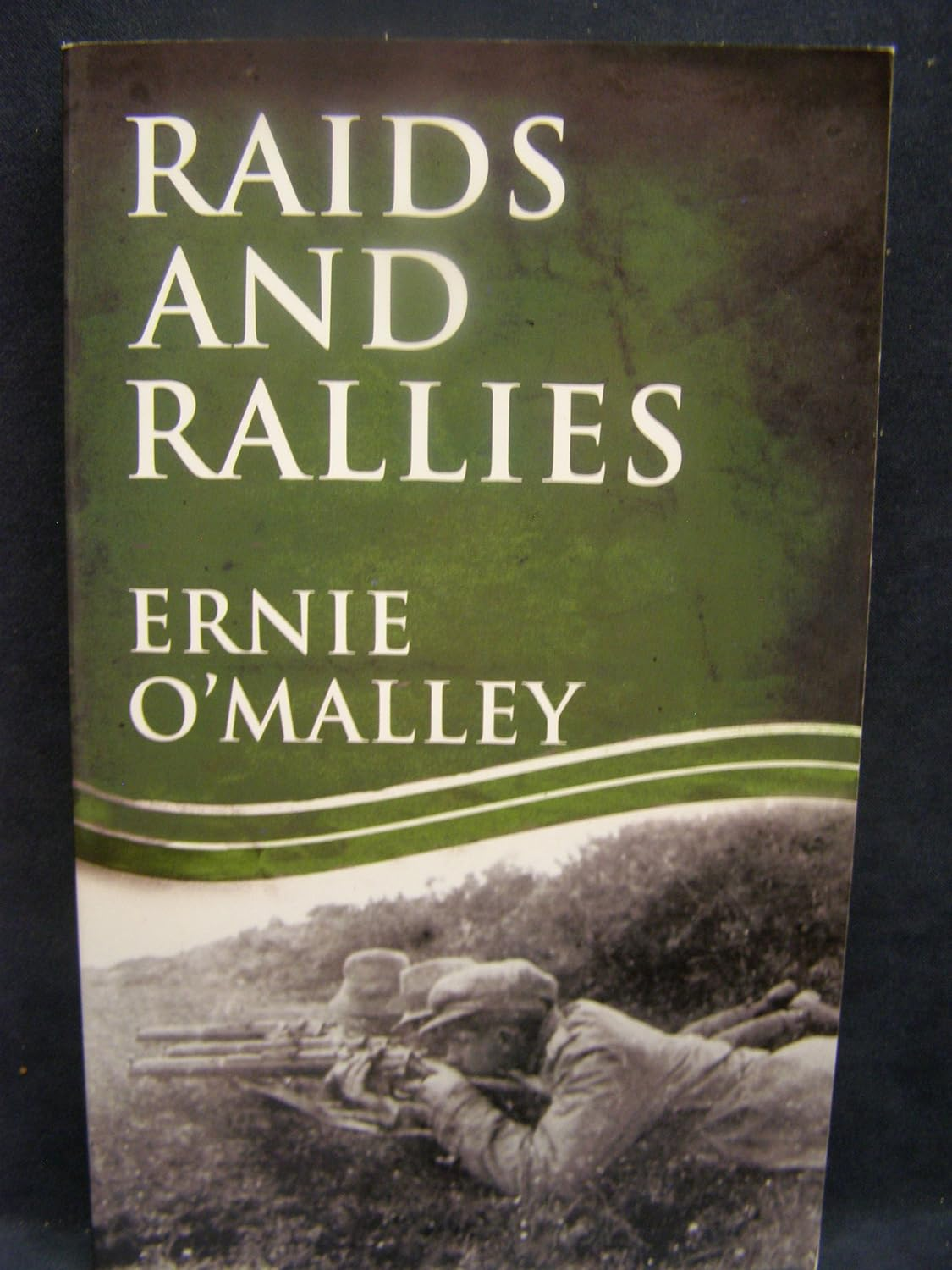
Cover of O'Malley's Raids and Rallies documenting attacks on police barracks (Mercier Press, 2011

- On Another Man's Wound (London, Rich & Cowan, 1936)
- Army Without Banners: Adventures of an Irish Volunteer (Boston, Houghton Mifflin, 1937)
- The Singing Flame (Dublin, Anvil Books, 1978)
- Raids and Rallies (Dublin, Anvil Books, 1982)
- Rising-Out: Seán Connolly of Longford (Dublin, UCD Press, 2007)
- Broken Landscapes: Selected Letters of Ernie O'Malley 1924–1957 (Dublin, Lilliput Press, 2011)
- "No Surrender Here!" The Civil War Papers of Ernie O'Malley 1922–1924 (Dublin, Lilliput Press, 2007)

In 1928, in a letter to fellow republican Sheila Humphreys, O'Malley explained his attitude to writing:

I have the bad and disagreeable habit of writing the truth as I see it, and not as other people (including yourself) realise it, in which we are a race of spiritualised idealists with a world idea of freedom, having nothing to learn for we have made no mistakes.

O'Malley's most celebrated writings are On Another Man's Wound, a memoir of the Irish War of Independence, and its sequel, The Singing Flame, a continuing memoir of his involvement in the Irish Civil War. These two volumes were written during O'Malley's time in New York, New Mexico and Mexico between 1929 and 1932. O'Malley's son also notes that On Another Man's Wound took seven years from start to finish before it was finally published. The work was ready for publication by 1932, but it was rejected by no fewer than thirteen American publishers. Thus, O'Malley had to wait until his return to Ireland in 1935 for the book to be considered by other publishers.

On Another Man's Wound was published in London and Dublin in 1936, although the seven pages detailing O'Malley's ill-treatment while under arrest in Dublin Castle were omitted. An unabridged version was published in America a year later under the title Army Without Banners: Adventures of an Irish Volunteer. The New York Times described it as "a stirring and beautiful account of a deeply felt experience", while the New York Herald Tribune called it "a tale of heroic adventure told without rancor or rhetoric". The book was a success and went down well with O'Malley's former comrades. Peadar O'Donnell had seen and edited the manuscript.

In an article in The Irish Times in 1996, the writer John McGahern described On Another Man's Wound as "the one classic work to have emerged directly from the violence that led to independence", adding that it "deserves a permanent and honoured place in our literature".

On Another Man’s Wound was published in Germany in 1938, 1941 and 1943 as Rebellen in Irland: Erlebnisse eines irischen Freiheitskämpfers (Rebels in Ireland: Experiences of an Irish Freedom Fighter). While the book was acclaimed internationally, not everyone was thrilled with it. A former IRA colleague, Joseph O'Doherty from Donegal, sued O'Malley for libel. This led to a court case in 1937, which O'Malley lost. It cost him £400 in damages, a substantial sum well over his annual pension.

Perhaps on account of its more controversial theme, The Singing Flame was not published until 1978, over twenty years after O'Malley's death. It was not until 1972 that Cormac O'Malley unexpectedly received the manuscript from a friend in the United States. Moreover, O'Malley's lack of knowledge of the civil war as a whole had required him to undertake years of research right into the 1950s. In all he undertook 450 interviews of his comrades over a five-year period in the late 1940s and early 1950s.

Based on these interviews, he gave a series of talks on Radio Éireann in 1953, which were popular. These in turn led to his 'IRA Raids' serial in The Sunday Press from 1955 to 1956. This series of articles was then consolidated and published as a book, Raids and Rallies, in 1982.

After his research was complete, O'Malley wrote a biography of Longford republican and fellow organiser Seán Connolly. It was published in 2007 as Rising-Out: Seán Connolly of Longford.

His official military and personal papers on the civil war were published in 2007, under the title, "No Surrender Here!" The Civil War Papers of Ernie O'Malley, 1922–1924. His personal letters were published in 2011 as Broken Landscapes: Selected Letters of Ernie O'Malley, 1924–1957. In 2012, a series entitled The Men Will Talk to Me: Ernie O'Malley's Interviews was initiated and has the interviews he made in Kerry, Galway, Mayo, Clare, Cork and with the Northern Divisions.

O'Malley wrote and published some poetry in Poetry magazine (Chicago) in 1935 and 1936, and in the Dubliner Magazine in 1935. From 1946 to 1948, he also contributed, as books editor, to the literary and cultural magazine, The Bell, edited by his old comrade Peadar O'Donnell now the editor of the periodical. In late 1946, O'Malley explained the recent revolutionary conflict in Ireland and the context of Irish neutrality during WWII for a French audience. O'Malley also gathered ballads and stories from the revolutionary period; and during World War II, he noted down over 300 traditionary folktales from his native area near Clew Bay in Mayo. The island information he collected from 1954 to 1956 saw the light of day in 2017 as Nobody's Business: The Aran Diaries of Ernie O'Malley. O'Malley wrote many as yet unpublished works of poetry, sketches, essays and his 1926 experiences in the Pyrenees. His extensive diaries, especially from his travels in Europe, New Mexico and Mexico, are held in New York.

== Sources ==
- English, Richard (1998). Ernie O'Malley: IRA Intellectual. Clarendon Press. ISBN 978-0-19-151867-6.
- Martin, Harry; O'Malley, Cormac (2021). Ernie O'Malley: A Life. Merrion Press. ISBN 978-1-78537-392-3.

| Dáil | Election | Deputy (Party) | Deputy (Party) | Deputy (Party) | Deputy (Party) | Deputy (Party) | Deputy (Party) | Deputy (Party) | Deputy (Party) |
|---|---|---|---|---|---|---|---|---|---|
| 4th | 1923 | Alfie Byrne (Ind.) | Francis Cahill (CnaG) | Margaret Collins-O'Driscoll (CnaG) | Seán McGarry (CnaG) | William Hewat (BP) | Richard Mulcahy (CnaG) | Seán T. O'Kelly (Rep) | Ernie O'Malley (Rep) |
| 4th | 1925 by-election | Alfie Byrne (Ind.) | Patrick Leonard (CnaG) | Margaret Collins-O'Driscoll (CnaG) | Oscar Traynor (Rep) | William Hewat (BP) | Richard Mulcahy (CnaG) | Seán T. O'Kelly (Rep) | Ernie O'Malley (Rep) |
| 5th | 1927 (Jun) | Alfie Byrne (Ind.) | John Byrne (CnaG) | Margaret Collins-O'Driscoll (CnaG) | Oscar Traynor (SF) | Denis Cullen (Lab) | Richard Mulcahy (CnaG) | Seán T. O'Kelly (FF) | Kathleen Clarke (FF) |
| 6th | 1927 (Sep) | Alfie Byrne (Ind.) | John Byrne (CnaG) | Margaret Collins-O'Driscoll (CnaG) | Patrick Leonard (CnaG) | James Larkin (IWL) | Richard Mulcahy (CnaG) | Seán T. O'Kelly (FF) | Eamonn Cooney (FF) |
| 6th | 1928 by-election | Alfie Byrne (Ind.) | John Byrne (CnaG) | Margaret Collins-O'Driscoll (CnaG) | Patrick Leonard (CnaG) | Vincent Rice (CnaG) | Richard Mulcahy (CnaG) | Seán T. O'Kelly (FF) | Eamonn Cooney (FF) |
| 6th | 1929 by-election | Thomas F. O'Higgins (CnaG) | John Byrne (CnaG) | Margaret Collins-O'Driscoll (CnaG) | Patrick Leonard (CnaG) | Vincent Rice (CnaG) | Richard Mulcahy (CnaG) | Seán T. O'Kelly (FF) | Eamonn Cooney (FF) |
| 7th | 1932 | Alfie Byrne (Ind.) | John Byrne (CnaG) | Margaret Collins-O'Driscoll (CnaG) | Oscar Traynor (FF) | Cormac Breathnach (FF) | Richard Mulcahy (CnaG) | Seán T. O'Kelly (FF) | Eamonn Cooney (FF) |
| 8th | 1933 | Alfie Byrne (Ind.) | Patrick Belton (CnaG) | Vincent Rice (CnaG) | Oscar Traynor (FF) | Cormac Breathnach (FF) | Richard Mulcahy (CnaG) | Seán T. O'Kelly (FF) | Eamonn Cooney (FF) |
| 9th | 1937 | Constituency abolished. See Dublin North-East and Dublin North-West | | | | | | | |

| Dáil | Election | Deputy (Party) | Deputy (Party) | Deputy (Party) | Deputy (Party) |
|---|---|---|---|---|---|
| 22nd | 1981 | Ray Burke (FF) | John Boland (FG) | Nora Owen (FG) | 3 seats 1981–1992 |
| 23rd | 1982 (Feb) | Ray Burke (FF) | John Boland (FG) | Nora Owen (FG) | 3 seats 1981–1992 |
| 24th | 1982 (Nov) | Ray Burke (FF) | John Boland (FG) | Nora Owen (FG) | 3 seats 1981–1992 |
| 25th | 1987 | Ray Burke (FF) | John Boland (FG) | G. V. Wright (FF) | 3 seats 1981–1992 |
| 26th | 1989 | Ray Burke (FF) | Nora Owen (FG) | Seán Ryan (Lab) | 3 seats 1981–1992 |
| 27th | 1992 | Ray Burke (FF) | Nora Owen (FG) | Seán Ryan (Lab) | Trevor Sargent (GP) |
| 28th | 1997 | Ray Burke (FF) | Nora Owen (FG) | G. V. Wright (FF) | Trevor Sargent (GP) |
| 28th | 1998 by-election | Seán Ryan (Lab) | Nora Owen (FG) | G. V. Wright (FF) | Trevor Sargent (GP) |
| 29th | 2002 | Seán Ryan (Lab) | Jim Glennon (FF) | G. V. Wright (FF) | Trevor Sargent (GP) |
| 30th | 2007 | James Reilly (FG) | Michael Kennedy (FF) | Darragh O'Brien (FF) | Trevor Sargent (GP) |
| 31st | 2011 | James Reilly (FG) | Alan Farrell (FG) | Brendan Ryan (Lab) | Clare Daly (SP) |
| 32nd | 2016 | Constituency abolished. See Dublin Fingal | | | |
