= Cormac O'Malley =

Irish American author

Cormac Kevin Hooker O'Malley (born 20 July 1942, Dublin) is an Irish American author and historian. The third child of Irish republican Ernie O'Malley and American sculptor Helen Hooker, O'Malley grew up in County Mayo in the west of Ireland, where collecting stamps got the young boy "thinking about other parts of the world". He was educated in England before moving to the United States to live with his mother after his father's death in 1957.

The family lived in Colorado, Greenwich, Connecticut, and New York city, and O'Malley attended Harvard University before a period in the U.S. Navy. He later graduated from Columbia Law School in New York city. O'Malley lives in Stonington, Connecticut. In 1971 he married Moira Kennedy of Columbia Law School, who later became the first director of the Ireland Fund and was an important figure in the Irish American diaspora. They had two children, daughter Bergin (1977) and son Conor (1979), and two grandchildren. The family's work saw them live in New York, Mexico City, Brussels and London. O'Malley's wife died in 2018.

Although O'Malley was unaware of his father's revolutionary past until after the latter's death in 1957, he has edited his father's three memoirs on the militant Irish nationalist struggle from 1916 to 1924: On Another Man’s Wound, The Singing Flame and Raids and Rallies. He owns the copyright to these works. The second and third works were published in 1972, when he was given his father's manuscript on the civil war era. In 2021 he co-authored a biography about his father, Ernie O'Malley: A Life. O'Malley is also the custodian of many papers left by his father and mother and has promoted his family's heritage through books, film, seminars and lectures. He entrusted his father's nationalist struggle papers to University College Dublin (UCD Archives) and those of a non-nationalist nature to New York University (NYU Archives of Irish America).

A former research associate at Trinity College Dublin in Dublin, O'Malley has been prominent in Irish American cultural exchange including serving as the president of the Glucksman Ireland House Board of Advisors. He was the organizer of the 2014 symposium on Ernie O'Malley and Modern Ireland and Revolution at Glucksman Ireland House. He was the producer for A Call to Arts, a 2020 documentary about his parents' journey through the arts.

O'Malley’s dream dinner party guests would be his father, Padraig Pearse and Michael Collins.

Of O'Malley a colleague observed: "Cormac O'Malley has enabled a dynamic corpus of scholarship on Ireland and on the transatlantic ties that bind Ireland and the U.S".

== Publications ==
- Cormac O'Malley and Richard English (ed.); Prisoners: The Civil War Letters of Ernie O'Malley (Swords, Poolbeg Press, 1991)
- Cormac O'Malley and Richard English (ed.); No Surrender Here!: The Civil War Papers of Ernie O'Malley; 1922-1924 (Dublin, The Lilliput Press, 2007)
- Cormac O'Malley (ed.); Rising Out, Sean Connolly of Longford, 1890-1921 by Ernie O'Malley (Dublin, UCD Press, 2007)
- Cormac O'Malley and Nicholas Allen (ed.); Broken Landscapes: Selected Letters of Ernie O'Malley, 1924-1957 (Dublin, The Lilliput Press, 2011)
- Cormac O'Malley and Tim Horgan (ed.); The Men Will Talk to Me: Kerry Interviews by Ernie O'Malley (Dublin, Mercier Press, 2012)
- Cormac O'Malley and Cormac Ó Comhraí (ed.); The Men Will Talk to Me: Galway Interviews by Ernie O'Malley (Dublin, Mercier, 2013)
- Cormac O'Malley and Vicent Keane (ed.); The Men Will Talk to Me: Mayo Interviews by Ernie O'Malley (Dublin, Mercier, 2014)
- Cormac O'Malley and Juliet Barron (ed.); Western Ways: Remembering Mayo Through the Eyes of Helen Hooker and Ernie O'Malley (Dublin, Mercier, 2015)
- Cormac O'Malley (ed.); Modern Ireland and Revolution, Ernie O'Malley in Context (Kildare, IAP, 2016)
- Cormac O'Malley and Róisín Kennedy (ed.); Nobody's Business: The Aran Diaries of Ernie O'Malley (Dublin, The Lilliput Press, 2017)
- Cormac O'Malley and Harry Martin; Ernie O'Malley: A Life (Newbridge, Merrion Press, 2021)
- Cormac O'Malley and Patrick Mahoney; The Enchanted Bay: Tales and Legends from Ernie O'Malley’s Irish Folklore Collection (Newbridge, Merrion Press, 2024)
