= Alexandra Podkolzina =

Russian-American tennis player

- Country (sports): Russia; United States
- Born: September 2, 1985 (age 39); Moscow, Russia
- Height: 5-11
- Plays: Right-handed
- Prize money: $29,817

Singles
- Highest ranking: No. 364 (September 22, 2008)

Grand Slam singles results
- US Open: 1R (2002)

Alexandra "Sasha" Podkolzina (born September 2, 1985) is a Russian-American former professional tennis player.

== Biography ==
Podkolzina was born in Moscow and trained briefly in Marbella, Spain before moving to the United States at the age of 13. Her family settled in Concord, California and she attended Northgate High School, while competing in junior tournaments.

A right-handed player, Podkolzina achieved a rare double in 2002 when she won both the USTA Girls 18s National Hardcourt and Claycourt Championships. This earned her a wildcard into the main draw of the 2002 US Open, where she was beaten in the first round by Anca Barna.

She played college tennis for UC Berkeley in 2003/04 and competed on the professional tour until 2008, reaching a best singles ranking of 364 in the world.
