= Barbara Breit =

American tennis player (1937–2022)

- Full name: Barbara Nicolette Breit
- Country (sports): United States
- Born: December 30, 1937; New York City
- Died: July 20, 2022 (aged 84); Madison, Wisconsin

Singles
- Highest ranking: No. 6 (1955, Lance Tingay)

Grand Slam singles results
- US Open: SF (1955)

Barbara Nicolette Breit (December 30, 1937 – July 20, 2022) was an American tennis player of the 1950s.

Breit, eldest of three sisters, was born to German emigrant parents in New York City and raised in Los Angeles. She won back to back national under 18s titles in 1954 and 1955. While still a schoolgirl, Breit upset third-seeded Beverly Baker Fleitz in the quarter-finals of the 1955 U.S. National Championships, before losing her semi-final match to Patricia Ward.

At the tournament now known as the Cincinnati Masters, Breit was seeded No. 1 in 1955 at age 17 years and six months. She is still the youngest player ever to get the top seed in women's singles in Cincinnati. She reached the semifinals that year before falling to unseeded and fellow Californian Mimi Arnold.

In 2015 she was inducted into the Southern California Jewish Sports Hall of Fame.
