= 2002 US Open – Women's singles =

Women's singles
- 2002 US Open

Final
- Champion: (United States) Serena Williams
- Runner-up: (United States) Venus Williams
- Score: 6–4, 6–3

Details
- Draw: 128
- Seeds: 32

Events
Singles	men	women		boys	girls
Doubles	men	women	mixed	boys	girls
WC Singles	men	women	quad
WC Doubles	men	women	quad
Legends	men	women	mixed
← 2001 ·	US Open	· 2003 →

Serena Williams defeated the two-time defending champion, her sister Venus Williams, in a rematch of the previous year's final, 6–4, 6–3 to win the women's singles tennis title at the 2002 US Open. It was her second US Open singles title and fourth major singles title overall. It was also the third component of her first "Serena Slam" (a non-calendar year Grand Slam) and her second consecutive major title won without losing a set during the tournament.

This marked the final major appearance of four-time major champion and former world No. 1 Arantxa Sánchez Vicario, who lost to Marion Bartoli in the first round. It was also the final US Open appearance of two-time champion Monica Seles, who lost to Venus Williams in the quarterfinals. It was also the first major appearance for future world No. 1 and three-time major finalist Dinara Safina, who lost in the second round to Serena Williams.

== Seeds ==
1. (United States) Serena Williams (champion)
2. (United States) Venus Williams (final)
3. (United States) Jennifer Capriati (quarterfinals)
4. (United States) Lindsay Davenport (semifinals)
5. (Australia) Jelena Dokić (second round)
6. (United States) Monica Seles (quarterfinals)
7. (Belgium) Kim Clijsters (fourth round)
8. (Belgium) Justine Henin (fourth round)
9. (Switzerland) Martina Hingis (fourth round)
10. (France) Amélie Mauresmo (semifinals)
11. (Slovakia) Daniela Hantuchová (quarterfinals)
12. (Russia) Elena Dementieva (second round)
13. (Italy) Silvia Farina Elia (fourth round)
14. (United States) Chanda Rubin (fourth round)
15. (Russia) Anastasia Myskina (third round)
16. (Bulgaria) Magdalena Maleeva (third round)
17. (Israel) Anna Smashnova (second round)
18. (Japan) Ai Sugiyama (second round)
19. (Luxembourg) Anne Kremer (first round)
20. (Czech Republic) Dája Bedáňová (fourth round)
21. (United States) Lisa Raymond (third round)
22. (Russia) Tatiana Panova (third round)
23. (Switzerland) Patty Schnyder (third round)
24. (Croatia) Iva Majoli (third round)
25. (Spain) Arantxa Sánchez Vicario (first round)
26. (France) Nathalie Dechy (third round)
27. (Thailand) Tamarine Tanasugarn (second round)
28. (Greece) Eleni Daniilidou (first round)
29. (Austria) Barbara Schett (second round)
30. (United States) Meghann Shaughnessy (third round)
31. (United States) Alexandra Stevenson (first round)
32. (Argentina) Paola Suárez (second round)

== Draw ==
=== Key ===
- Q = Qualifier
- WC = Wild card
- LL = Lucky loser
- Alt = Alternate
- ITF = ITF entry
- PR = Protected ranking
- SR = Special ranking
- SE = Special exempt
- JE = Junior exempt
- JR = Junior Accelerator Programme entrant
- CO = College Accelerator Programme entrant
- NG = Next Gen Accelerator Program entrant
- w/o = Walkover
- r = Retired
- d = Defaulted

=== Finals ===
Quarterfinals
1	(United States) Serena Williams	6	6
11	(Slovakia) Daniela Hantuchová	2	2
4	(United States) Lindsay Davenport	3	6	6
(Russia) Elena Bovina	6	0	2
10	(France) Amélie Mauresmo	4	7^{7}	6
3	(United States) Jennifer Capriati	6	6^{5}	3
6	(United States) Monica Seles	2	3
2	(United States) Venus Williams	6	6

Semifinals
1	(United States) Serena Williams	6	7
4	(United States) Lindsay Davenport	3	5
10	(France) Amélie Mauresmo	3	7	4
2	(United States) Venus Williams	6	5	6

Final
1	(United States) Serena Williams	6	6
2	(United States) Venus Williams	4	3

=== Top half ===
==== Section 1 ====
First round
1	(United States) S Williams	6	6
WC	(United States) C Morariu	2	3
(Italy) R Grande	6^{5}	1
(Russia) D Safina	7^{7}	6
(Uzbekistan) I Tulyaganova	6	6
(Italy) Ad Serra Zanetti	0	0
(Slovenia) M Matevžič	3	6^{4}
26	(France) N Dechy	6	7^{7}
20	(Czech Republic) D Bedáňová	6	6
(Russia) A Jidkova	1	3
WC	(United States) A Baker	6	2	6^{3}
(Russia) E Likhovtseva	4	6	7^{7}
Q	(Czech Republic) D Chládková	6	6
(United States) M Tu	0	4
(Spain) M Marrero	6	4	0
15	(Russia) A Myskina	4	6	6

Second round
1	(United States) S Williams	6	6
(Russia) D Safina	0	1
(Uzbekistan) I Tulyaganova	1	6	6^{1}
26	(France) N Dechy	6	3	7^{7}
20	(Czech Republic) D Bedáňová	7^{7}	2	6
(Russia) E Likhovtseva	6^{2}	6	3
Q	(Czech Republic) D Chládková	6	5	1
15	(Russia) A Myskina	3	7	6

Third round
1	(United States) S Williams	6	6
26	(France) N Dechy	1	1
20	(Czech Republic) D Bedáňová	6	3	6
15	(Russia) A Myskina	3	6	2

Fourth round
1	(United States) S Williams	6	6
20	(Czech Republic) D Bedáňová	1	1

==== Section 2 ====
First round
11	(Slovakia) D Hantuchová	6	6
(Australia) N Pratt	2	1
(Argentina) M Díaz Oliva	5	1
(France) V Razzano	7	6
(Slovenia) K Srebotnik	6	6
(United States) L Granville	3	4
WC	(United States) A Harkleroad	3	2
24	(Croatia) I Majoli	6	6
27	(Thailand) T Tanasugarn	6	6^{4}	6
(Germany) B Rittner	4	7^{7}	2
WC	(United States) B Bielik	6	6
Q	(Czech Republic) R Voráčová	4	4
(Zimbabwe) C Black	6	6^{8}	6
Q	(Argentina) ME Salerni	3	7^{10}	4
(United States) S Reeves	1	2
8	(Belgium) J Henin	6	6

Second round
11	(Slovakia) D Hantuchová	6	6
(France) V Razzano	3	2
(Slovenia) K Srebotnik	4	4
24	(Croatia) I Majoli	6	6
27	(Thailand) T Tanasugarn	4	2
WC	(United States) B Bielik	6	6
(Zimbabwe) C Black	3	2
8	(Belgium) J Henin	6	6

Third round
11	(Slovakia) D Hantuchová	6	6
24	(Croatia) I Majoli	3	1
WC	(United States) B Bielik	5	1
8	(Belgium) J Henin	7	6

Fourth round
11	(Slovakia) D Hantuchová	6	3	7^{7}
8	(Belgium) J Henin	1	6	6^{4}

==== Section 3 ====
First round
4	(United States) L Davenport	6	6
(Denmark) E Dyrberg	2	1
(Hungary) P Mandula	4	6	6
(Netherlands) M Oremans	6	4	2
(Paraguay) R Neffa-de los Ríos	6	6
(Slovakia) L Cervanová	1	4
Q	(France) M Bartoli	6	6
25	(Spain) A Sánchez Vicario	3	1
19	(Luxembourg) A Kremer	6^{3}	2
Q	(Russia) S Kuznetsova	7^{7}	6
(Slovakia) J Husárová	6	7
Q	(Bulgaria) M Geznenge	0	5
(Italy) T Garbin	0	6	1
(Belgium) E Callens	6	2	6
Q	(United States) B Rippner	1	4
13	(Italy) S Farina Elia	6	6

Second round
4	(United States) L Davenport	6	6
(Hungary) P Mandula	4	2
(Paraguay) R Neffa-de los Ríos	6	2	2
Q	(France) M Bartoli	3	6	6
Q	(Russia) S Kuznetsova	2	6	6
(Slovakia) J Husárová	6	3	2
(Belgium) E Callens	2	2
13	(Italy) S Farina Elia	6	6

Third round
4	(United States) L Davenport	6	6
Q	(France) M Bartoli	3	1
Q	(Russia) S Kuznetsova	2	3
13	(Italy) S Farina Elia	6	6

Fourth round
4	(United States) L Davenport	6	6
13	(Italy) S Farina Elia	3	1

==== Section 4 ====
First round
12	(Russia) E Dementieva	6	6
(Japan) S Obata	2	3
(Italy) F Schiavone	3	6	6
Q	(United States) A Cargill	6	1	1
WC	(United States) S Taylor	3	6	2
Q	(Colombia) F Zuluaga	6	4	6
(United States) L Osterloh	1	1
22	(Russia) T Panova	6	6
31	(United States) A Stevenson	4	7	3
(France) S Foretz	6	5	6
(Russia) A Kournikova	3	0
(Indonesia) A Widjaja	6	6
(Argentina) C Fernández	6^{5}	6^{6}
(Russia) E Bovina	7^{7}	7^{8}
(Germany) G Arn	2	2
5	(Federal Republic of Yugoslavia) J Dokić	6	6

Second round
12	(Russia) E Dementieva	6^{7}	3
(Italy) F Schiavone	7^{9}	6
Q	(Colombia) F Zuluaga	7	5	4
22	(Russia) T Panova	5	7	6
(France) S Foretz	7	6
(Indonesia) A Widjaja	5	1
(Russia) E Bovina	6	6
5	(Federal Republic of Yugoslavia) J Dokić	3	2

Third round
(Italy) F Schiavone	3	6	6
22	(Russia) T Panova	6	4	3
(France) S Foretz	2	7	5
(Russia) E Bovina	6	5	7

Fourth round
(Italy) F Schiavone	6^{4}	4
(Russia) E Bovina	7^{7}	6

=== Bottom half ===
==== Section 5 ====
First round
7	(Belgium) K Clijsters	6	6
(Spain) C Martínez Granados	1	0
(Spain) G León García	4	3
WC	(United States) M Washington	6	6
(Switzerland) E Gagliardi	3	3
(Russia) V Zvonareva	6	6
(Slovakia) H Nagyová	7	4	7
28	(Greece) E Daniilidou	5	6	5
23	(Switzerland) P Schnyder	7^{8}	5	6
PR	(Russia) N Petrova	6^{6}	7	2
(Czech Republic) A Gerši	1	7	0
(Slovakia) M Suchá	6	5	6
(Spain) C Torrens Valero	7^{7}	6
(Germany) A Rösch	6^{1}	3
Q	(Czech Republic) I Benešová	3	2
10	(France) A Mauresmo	6	6

Second round
7	(Belgium) K Clijsters	6	7^{7}
WC	(United States) M Washington	1	6^{1}
(Russia) V Zvonareva	6	6
(Slovakia) H Nagyová	1	0
23	(Switzerland) P Schnyder	6	6
(Slovakia) M Suchá	3	3
(Spain) C Torrens Valero	6^{3}	2
10	(France) A Mauresmo	7^{7}	6

Third round
7	(Belgium) K Clijsters	1	7	6
(Russia) V Zvonareva	6	5	4
23	(Switzerland) P Schnyder	1	4
10	(France) A Mauresmo	6	6

Fourth round
7	(Belgium) K Clijsters	6	3	5
10	(France) A Mauresmo	4	6	7

==== Section 6 ====
First round
16	(Bulgaria) M Maleeva	6	3	7
(Czech Republic) K Hrdličková	3	6	5
(Japan) S Asagoe	4	6^{9}
(France) É Loit	6	7^{11}
(United States) A Frazier	6	6
(Spain) V Ruano Pascual	3	3
Q	(South Korea) M-r Jeon	3	3
18	(Japan) A Sugiyama	6	6
30	(United States) M Shaughnessy	6	6
(Indonesia) W Prakusya	3	4
(Germany) M Weingärtner	1	2
(Spain) C Martínez	6	6
(Slovenia) T Pisnik	6	6
PR	(United States) S Cacic	2	2
Q	(United States) B Mattek	0	0
3	(United States) J Capriati	6	6

Second round
16	(Bulgaria) M Maleeva	4	6	7
(France) É Loit	6	3	5
(United States) A Frazier	6	6
18	(Japan) A Sugiyama	4	2
30	(United States) M Shaughnessy	6	6
(Spain) C Martínez	3	2
(Slovenia) T Pisnik	4	2
3	(United States) J Capriati	6	6

Third round
16	(Bulgaria) M Maleeva	6	2	2
(United States) A Frazier	3	6	6
30	(United States) M Shaughnessy	2	2
3	(United States) J Capriati	6	6

Fourth round
(United States) A Frazier	1	3
3	(United States) J Capriati	6	6

==== Section 7 ====
First round
6	(United States) M Seles	6	6
(Hungary) Z Gubacsi	3	3
(Croatia) S Talaja	4	6	2
(Austria) B Schwartz	6	4	6
Q	(South Korea) Y-j Cho	6	6
(Spain) M Serna	3	4
(France) M Pierce	6^{3}	3
32	(Argentina) P Suárez	7^{7}	6
17	(Israel) A Smashnova	7^{7}	6
(Switzerland) M-G Mikaelian	6^{1}	4
(Belarus) T Poutchek	6^{3}	6^{7}
(South Africa) A Coetzer	7^{7}	7^{9}
(Spain) Á Montolio	6	2	4
Q	(Italy) An Serra Zanetti	1	6	6
(United States) M Irvin	3	7	4
9/WC	(Switzerland) M Hingis	6	5	6

Second round
6	(United States) M Seles	1	7^{7}	6
(Austria) B Schwartz	6	6^{5}	2
Q	(South Korea) Y-j Cho	6	6
32	(Argentina) P Suárez	4	4
17	(Israel) A Smashnova	2	4
(South Africa) A Coetzer	6	6
Q	(Italy) An Serra Zanetti	4	1
9/WC	(Switzerland) M Hingis	6	6

Third round
6	(United States) M Seles	6	5	6
Q	(South Korea) Y-j Cho	1	7	3
(South Africa) A Coetzer	3	4
9/WC	(Switzerland) M Hingis	6	6

Fourth round
6	(United States) M Seles	6	6
9/WC	(Switzerland) M Hingis	4	2

==== Section 8 ====
First round
14	(United States) C Rubin	6	6
(United States) J Craybas	1	3
(Germany) A Barna	6	6
WC	(United States) A Podkolzina	1	2
(Switzerland) M Casanova	6	6
(Croatia) J Kostanić	4	3
(United States) J Hopkins	4	3
21	(United States) L Raymond	6	6
29	(Austria) B Schett	6	6
(Sweden) A Svensson	3	2
Q	(Estonia) M Ani	2	2
(Germany) M Müller	6	6
(Australia) A Molik	6	6
(Austria) P Wartusch	4	0
Q	(Croatia) M Lučić	0	0
2	(United States) V Williams	6	6

Second round
14	(United States) C Rubin	6	6
(Germany) A Barna	4	1
(Switzerland) M Casanova	4	2
21	(United States) L Raymond	6	6
29	(Austria) B Schett	7	2	5
(Germany) M Müller	5	6	7
(Australia) A Molik	1	2
2	(United States) V Williams	6	6

Third round
14	(United States) C Rubin	7^{7}	6
21	(United States) L Raymond	6^{2}	4
(Germany) M Müller	1	2
2	(United States) V Williams	6	6

Fourth round
14	(United States) C Rubin	2	6	5
2	(United States) V Williams	6	4	7

== Other entry information ==
=== Wild cards ===
- (United States) Ally Baker
- (United States) Bea Bielik
- (United States) Ashley Harkleroad
- (Switzerland) Martina Hingis
- (United States) Corina Morariu
- (United States) Alexandra Podkolzina
- (United States) Sarah Taylor
- (United States) Mashona Washington

=== Protected ranking ===
- (United States) Sandra Cacic
- (Russia) Nadia Petrova

=== Qualifiers ===
- (Estonia) Maret Ani
- (France) Marion Bartoli
- (Czech Republic) Iveta Benešová
- (United States) Ansley Cargill
- (Czech Republic) Denisa Chládková
- (South Korea) Cho Yoon-jeong
- (Bulgaria) Maria Geznenge
- (South Korea) Jeon Mi-ra
- (Russia) Svetlana Kuznetsova
- (Croatia) Mirjana Lučić
- (United States) Bethanie Mattek
- (United States) Brie Rippner
- (Argentina) María Emilia Salerni
- (Czech Republic) Renata Voráčová
- (Italy) Antonella Serra Zanetti
- (Colombia) Fabiola Zuluaga

=== Withdrawals ===
- (Spain) Anabel Medina Garrigues → replaced by (Japan) Saori Obata
- (France) Sandrine Testud → replaced by (Czech Republic) Adriana Gerši

Preceded by 2002 Wimbledon Championships – Women's singles	Grand Slam women's singles	Succeeded by 2003 Australian Open – Women's singles
