= USTA Girls 18s National Championships =

Tournament information
- Founded: 1918
- Location: San Diego; United States
- Venue: Barnes Tennis Center
- Surface: Hard court - outdoors
- Draw: 256S / / 128D

Current champions (2025)
- Singles: (United States) Alyssa Ahn
- Doubles: (United States) Thea Frodin (United States) Kristina Penickova

The USTA Girls 18s National Championships is a junior tennis tournament held on outdoor hard courts in San Diego. It is the highest level domestic junior tournament hosted by the USTA. The tournament is contested in early August just before the US Open. The winners of the singles and doubles events are awarded with a wild card into the US Open.

== Singles champions ==
Year	Champion	Runner-up	Score
1918	(United States) Katherine Porter		
1919	(United States) Katherine Gardner		
1920	(United States) Louise Dixon		
1921	(United States) Helen Wills		
1922	(United States) Helen Wills		
1923	(United States) Helen Hooker		
1924	(United States) Helen Jacobs		
1925	(United States) Helen Jacobs		
1926	(United States) Louise McFarland		
1927	(United States) Marjorie Gladman		
1928	(United States) Sarah Palfrey		
1929	(United States) Sarah Palfrey		
1930	(United States) Sarah Palfrey		
1931	(United States) Ruby Bishop		
1932	(United States) Helen Fulton		
1933	(United States) Bonnie Miller		
1934	(United States) Helen Pedersen		
1935	(United States) Patricia Henry		
1936	(United States) Margaret Osborne		
1937	(United States) Barbara Winslow		
1938	(United States) Helen Bernhard		
1939	(United States) Helen Bernhard		
1940	(United States) Louise Brough		
1941	(United States) Louise Brough		
1942	(United States) Doris Hart		
1943	(United States) Doris Hart		
1944	(United States) Shirley Fry		
1945	(United States) Shirley Fry		
1946	(United States) Helen Pastall		
1947	(United States) Nancy Chaffee		
1948	(United States) Beverly Baker		
1949	(United States) Maureen Connolly		
1950	(United States) Maureen Connolly		
1951	(United States) Arita Kanter		
1952	(United States) Julia Sampson		
1953	(United States) Mary Ann Ellenberger		
1954	(United States) Barbara Breit		
1955	(United States) Barbara Breit		
1956	(United States) Miriam Arnold		
1957	(United States) Karen Hantze		
1958	(United States) Sally Moore		
1959	(United States) Karen Hantze		
1960	(United States) Karen Hantze		
1961	(United States) Victoria Palmer		
1962	(United States) Victoria Palmer		
1963	(United States) Julie Heldman		
1964	(United States) Mary Ann Eisel		
1965	(United States) Jane Bartkowicz		
1966	(United States) Jane Bartkowicz		
1967	(United States) Jane Bartkowicz		
1968	(United States) Kristy Pigeon		
1969	(United States) Sharon Walsh		
1970	(United States) Sharon Walsh		
1971	(United States) Chris Evert	(United States) Janet Newberry	6–1, 6–3
1972	(United States) Ann Kiyomura		
1973	(United States) Carrie Fleming		
1974	(United States) Rayni Fox		
1975	(United States) Beth Norton		
1976	(United States) Lynn Epstein		
1977	(United States) Tracy Austin		
1978	(United States) Tracy Austin		
1979	(United States) Andrea Jaeger		
1980	(United States) Kate Gompert		
1981	(United States) Lisa Bonder		
1982	(United States) Leigh-Anne Eldredge		
1983	(United States) Caroline Kuhlman		
1984	(United States) Melissa Gurney		
1985	(United States) Stephanie Rehe		
1986	(United States) Tami Whitlinger		
1987	(United States) Ann Grossman		
1988	(United States) Laxmi Poruri		
1989	(United States) Jennifer Capriati		
1990	(United States) Lisa Raymond		
1991	(United States) Lindsay Davenport		
1992	(United States) Maria Vento		
1993	(United States) Janet Lee		
1994	(United States) Meilen Tu		
1995	(United States) Aubrie Rippner		
1996	(United States) Lilia Osterloh		
1997	(United States) Jacqueline Trail		
1998	(United States) Laura Granville		
1999	(United States) Laura Granville		
2000	(United States) Kristen Schlukebir		
2001	(United States) Amber Liu	(United States) Ally Baker	6–1, 6–2
2002	(United States) Alexandra Podkolzina	(United States) Whitney Deason	4–6, 6–2, 6–1
2003	(United States) Theresa Logar	(United States) Alexandra Podkolzina	6–3, 6–4
2004	(United States) Jessica Kirkland	(United States) Andrea Remynse	6–1, 6–3
2005	(United States) Mary Gambale	(United States) Alexa Glatch	7–6, 5–7, 6–1
2006	(United States) Lauren Albanese	(United States) Ashley Weinhold	6–3, 6–0
2007	(United States) Ashley Weinhold	(United States) Alison Riske	6–3, 6–3
2008	(United States) Gail Brodsky	(United States) Coco Vandeweghe	7–5, 6–1
2009	(United States) Christina McHale	(United States) Lauren Embree	6–0, 6–1
2010	(United States) Shelby Rogers	(United States) Nicole Gibbs	6–3, 5–7, 7–6
2011	(United States) Lauren Davis	(United States) Nicole Gibbs	7–6, 1–6, 6–3
2012	(United States) Victoria Duval	(United States) Allie Kiick	3–6, 6–1, 6–0
2013	(United States) Sachia Vickery	(United States) Allie Kiick	4–6, 6–2, 6–0
2014	(United States) CiCi Bellis	(United States) Tornado Alicia Black	6–3, 6–1
2015	(United States) Sofia Kenin	(United States) Tornado Alicia Black	6–2, 5–7, 7–5
2016	(United States) Kayla Day	(United States) Nicole Frenkel	6–2, 3–6, 6–1
2017	(United States) Ashley Kratzer	(United States) Kelly Chen	6–2, 4–6, 6–4
2018	(United States) Whitney Osuigwe	(United States) Kayla Day	7–5, 6–3
2019	(United States) Katie Volynets	(United States) Emma Navarro	6–2, 6–4
2021	(United States) Ashlyn Krueger	(United States) Reese Brantmeier	6–2, 7–6^{(7–3)}
2022	(United States) Eleana Yu	(United States) Valerie Glozman	6–3, 7–5
2023	(United States) Clervie Ngounoue	(United States) Katherine Hui	1–6, 6–4, 6–2
2024	(United States) Iva Jovic	(United States) Valerie Glozman	7–6^{(8–6)}, 6–3
2025	(United States) Alyssa Ahn	(United States) Maya Iyengar	6–1, 6–2
