= Helen Hooker =

American sculptor and painter (1905–1993)

- Hooker circa 1930
- Born: 1 January 1905; Greenwich, Connecticut, U.S.
- Died: 2 April 1993 (aged 88); Greenwich, Connecticut, U.S.
- Known for: Sculpture and portrait painting
- Parent(s): Elon Huntington Hooker and Blanche Ferry

Helen Huntington Hooker or Helen Hooker O'Malley Roelefs (1 January 1905 – 2 April 1993) was an American sculptor and portrait painter who spent a considerable part of her career in Ireland.

== Early life ==
Helen Huntington Hooker was born in Greenwich, Connecticut on 1 January 1905. She was the third of four daughters of engineer and businessman Elon Huntington Hooker, and Blanche Ferry, a daughter of entrepreneur Dexter M. Ferry and Adeline E. Miller. Helen's family were wealthy and well-established in American society and reportedly had six governors of Connecticut and Massachusetts among their forebears. She attended Miss Chapin's School in New York City until 1923, and in the same year won the American National Junior Tennis Championship, ranking tenth.

Artistic from an early age, she made her first sculpture of a rabbit at age 6. Instead of attending university, Hooker established a studio practice and enrolled with the Art Students League of New York. She studied sculpture with Mahonri Young, William Zorach, and Edmond Amateis in New York, and later in Paris at Académie de la Grande Chaumière with Antoine Bourdelle. Hooker was well-travelled, studying wood carving in Germany, sculpture and dance in Greece, theatre design in Moscow, and painting in Leningrad, where she learned from the Russian avant-garde painter Pavel Filonov.

== Time in Ireland ==
In 1933, Hooker met and fell in love with the Irish writer Ernie O'Malley, of whom her family did not approve. However, the couple married on 27 September 1935 at the Marylebone registry office in London. The couple first moved to 229 Upper Rathmines Road in Dublin and later moved to County Mayo in Autumn 1937. With financial assistance from Hooker's father, the couple rented and then bought Burrishoole Lodge in Curraunboy near Newport, County Mayo, with 40 acres in Hooker's name. She bought an additional 30 acres in 1942, which the family worked as a farm. They amassed an extensive art collection, which included works by Jack Butler Yeats, Evie Hone, Mainie Jellett, Paul Henry, Nano Reid, John Piper, Henry Moore, Amedeo Modigliani, and Georges Rouault. The couple had three children, Cathal, Etáin, and Cormac. By 1944, their marriage was failing, leading to Hooker requesting a divorce in late 1946 in the United States. They finally separated and divorced in 1952, and Hooker abducted two of the eldest children to Colorado Springs, Colorado without O'Malley's consent. Their youngest remained with O'Malley in Ireland.

Hooker continued to be a generous patron of the arts in Ireland. In 1992, she donated a collection of 1,200 of her photographic works to the National Library of Ireland. The photographs were taken by Hooker and O'Malley, and featured ancient monastic sites, scenic views, and candid portrait photographs. Hooker established the O'Malley collection of paintings by other artists in collaboration with the Irish American Cultural Institution. Part of this collection is on permanent loan to the Irish Museum of Modern Art and the other half with the Mayo County Council. She originally wished a museum would be built in Mayo to house the collection, but it did not come to fruition.

== Artistic work ==
After returning to Connecticut in 1930, she held an exhibition of her watercolours at the Darien Guild of Seven Arts, and a further show at the National Arts Club in New York in 1933. Hooker exhibited her first work in Ireland in 1943, Island woman, at the Irish Exhibition of Living Art, and A portrait of Mrs Kiernan at the Royal Hibernian Academy. She showed seven more pieces at the Living Art exhibitions from 1944 to 1948. Hooker built a studio at Burrishoole in December 1943, but bought and moved into a house at 15 Whitebeam Avenue in Clonskeagh, Dublin in Autumn 1944. From Clonskeagh, she began work with the Players Theatre at Trinity College Dublin, doing theatre design. Following the end of her marriage, Hooker split her time between Connecticut and Dublin. She held her first solo show in St Stephen's Green Gallery in 1950, which featured busts of Liam O'Flaherty and Denis Johnston. The Dublin Magazine wrote that Hooker was "in the academic tradition as a sculptor. She models well and surely; and in her straight portraiture shows excellent feeling for character. She is not so successful when she attempts to simplify or formalise which, admittedly, she does rarely."

Following her return to the States, she held her first exhibition of sculpture at the Taylor Museum of the Colorado Springs Fine Arts Center. Hooker spent six months of every year in Ireland from 1960, writing that "I have made my name as an artist in Dublin...My best years I gave to Ireland with all my heart and my soul." She modeled numerous famous Irish figures, such as Mary Lavin, Eavan Boland, Austin Clarke, Dana Rosemary Scallon, and Éamon de Valera. De Valera did not sit for Hooker, but they had tea together for 20 minutes, after which Hooker retired to a Dublin hotel and reportedly worked for 36 hours, modeling from memory. She exhibited a portrait of Patrick Carey with the RHA in 1974, but she generally exhibited more in the U.S. than in Ireland. A 1973 retrospective of her work was held at Fairfield Court in Greenwich, Connecticut and was sponsored by the American Irish Historical Society. In 1980, 18 of her works cast in polyester from plaster originals were featured at the Birmingham Museum of Art in Alabama. The Ferguson Library in Stamford, Connecticut hosted an exhibition of 21 of Hooker's portraits in 1985, including a portraits of Seamus Heaney, Samuel Beckett, James Galway, and Seán O'Casey.

== Later life ==
Hooker married Richard Roelofs, Jr. on 15 August 1956 at Chelmsford, her family's estate in Greenwich, Connecticut. She was widowed in 1971. Hooker died on 2 April 1993, in Greenwich. The University of Limerick officially inaugurated the Helen Hooker-O'Malley Roelofs Sculpture Trust in September 1993. The trust includes all 41 heads and figures of her Irish portraits. As of 2004, the University of Limerick now holds a permanent exhibition of the O'Malley Collection.
