= Ambrose Victor Martin =

Irish republican activist

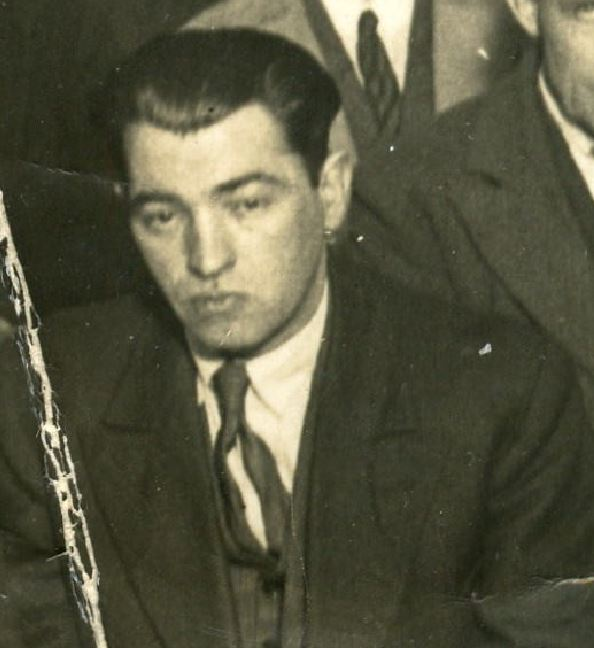
- Born: 5 April 1900; Buenos Aires, Argentina
- Died: 6 July 1974 (aged 74); Dublin, Ireland
- Other names: Ambrosio, Ambrosi
- Education: St. Finian's College
- Occupations: Political activist, trade manager
- Spouse: Margaret Harding (m. 1918) Amelia Coates (m. 1968)
- Parent: María Juana Martin

Signature
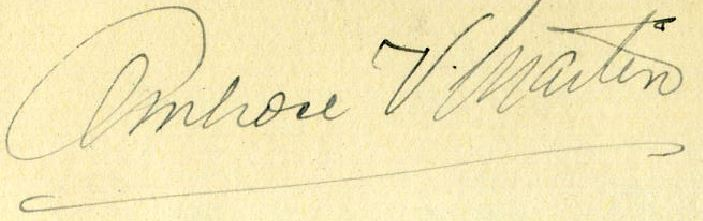

Ambrose Victor Martin (variably "Ambrosio" in Spanish or "Ambrosi" in Catalan) was an Irish-Argentinian known largely for his Irish republican activism in Argentina and Spain.

== Early life ==
Ambrose Martin was born in the province of Buenos Aires, Argentina in 1900 to an Irish-Argentinian family from County Westmeath. Martin was raised in the small town of Suipacha alongside many other Argentinians of Irish descent. It was probably also during this time that he became acquainted with the many Basque-Argentinians who lived in Suipacha as well, as he would go on to become deeply involved in the Basque nationalist movement both in Spain and Latin America later in his life.

In 1914, he was sent off to Mullingar, Ireland to attend St. Finian's College, where he would spend the remainder of his childhood.

== Early involvement in politics ==
Following the 1916 Easter Rising, the young Ambrose Martin was swept up in the revolutionary fervour and became involved in Sinn Féin. Martin rose within the ranks of the movement, coming to be known as a vibrant orator, and becoming acquainted with notable figures such as Laurence Ginnell, Eamon Bulfin, and Margaret Mary Pearse. He was arrested by the British authorities in 1919 and deported back to Argentina.

In Argentina, Ambrose Martin busily worked with Irish republicans to propagandize and raise funds for the movement back in Ireland. He was even apparently implicated in an attempt to organize an IRA brigade in Argentina. Martin was involved with a faction of the Irish-Argentinian community headed by Patrick McManus, a staunch republican from County Donegal whose hardline politics caused annoyance to the small cadre of diplomats sent over from Dublin.

After two years, Martin began to journey back to Ireland in 1922 after the pronouncement of the Anglo-Irish Treaty brought an end to the Irish War of Independence. On his way to Ireland, he made a stop in the Basque Country, where he was scheduled to give a series of lectures on Ireland to the youth group of the Basque Nationalist Party. Martin claimed to have 'old friends' from the area, likely going back to his early years in rural Buenos Aires. He made a great impression on the young Basque nationalists, whose press organ reported that "never before have we seen our patriotic youth as impassioned". Martin also gave an inaugural speech on Cumann na mBan for the Basque nationalist women's group Emakume Abertzale Batza ("Association of Patriot Women"). During this visit, he became good friends with Eli Gallastegi and other figures in the pro-independence faction Aberri faction of the Basque Nationalist Party.

Martin returned to Ireland in April 1922, shortly before the outbreak of the Irish Civil War. Martin himself claims to have fought with the IRA against the Irish Free State, though later Irish intelligence assessed this claim to be false, believing that he was running the family grocery shop in Kilbeggan for the duration of the war. Martin left Ireland in 1924, returning to the Basque Country at some point late in the year. In November 1924 he was apparently arrested by Spanish police alongside some Basque nationalists during a mendigoxale (mountaineering) outing at which he spoke on the Irish struggle for freedom. During the military dictatorship of Miguel Primo de Rivera (1923-1930), Basque nationalism was heavily persecuted, pressuring Martin and many of his Basque comrades to leave for France.

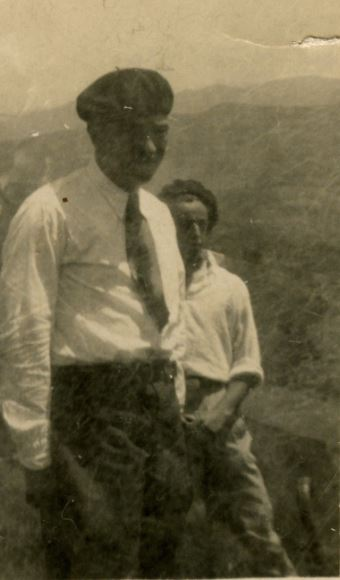
Ambrose Martin in the Basque mountains circa 1924

Ambrose Martin next appeared in Paris, lodging with a band of similarly exiled Catalan nationalists. During this time, he became affiliated with the Catalan nationalist party Estat Català, led by Francesc Macià. He also came into contact with Leopold Kerney, Ireland's pioneering diplomat in France at the time. As his associates in Estat Català planned a military operation to send an army through France into Catalonia and proclaim an independent republic, Ambrose Martin supplied them with Irish republican propaganda and writings on IRA tactics. Martin also assisted with a Basque plan to stage an uprising in coordination with that of Estat Català. On one occasion, Martin had Leopold Kerney forward a request to Dublin for IRA veterans to help "polish furniture" in the Basque Country. During this period, Martin was a key node connecting important figures in the Irish republican movement with their Basque and Catalan nationalist counterparts, who often consciously followed the Irish example. Martin appears to have abandoned the rebellion plot in late 1925 or early 1926, working temporarily in the home of an aristocratic family in Paris. The Catalan plot was eventually foiled by French police, who had been keeping close tabs on the radical exiles from Spain. Martin returned to Argentina in 1927.

== Return to Ireland ==
Exiled in Argentina again, Ambrose Martin returned to Suipacha where he opened a business called the "Basque-Irish Café" catering to the local Basque and Irish diasporas.

In 1932, Éamon de Valera's Fianna Fáil party won the Irish election. With many old anti-Treatyites rehabilitated, Martin made his way back to Ireland after approximately eight years in exile. He again stopped first in the Basque Country where he gave another series of lectures which were received with much enthusiasm. Upon returning to Ireland, Martin received lucrative business licenses from the new government to open an import-export business. Amidst the early stages of the Anglo-Irish Trade War, Martin was well-positioned to make a fortune as he tapped new markets for Irish products. Martin established the Irish-Iberian Trading Company in Dublin, and his Basque partners set up a parallel import-export business in Bilbao called Euzkerin with which they cooperatively coordinated Basque-Irish trade.

With the outbreak of the Spanish Civil War in 1936, Martin thrust himself into politics again. In January 1937, Martin assisted the Republican Congress when they brought over Basque priest Ramón Laborda for a publicity tour to raise support for the Second Spanish Republic in Ireland. For his sympathies with the republican government in Spain, Martin was denounced by far-right TD Patrick Belton as "one of the most pronounced and prominent Communists in this country." Martin was a strong advocate for the Basque nationalists during the war, and relayed messages from the Basque government to the press in Ireland. Following the fall of pro-republican Basque territory to the rebel armies of Francisco Franco, Basque nationalist icon Eli Gallastegi moved his family to Ireland thanks to the efforts of his close friend Ambrose Martin.

== Later life ==
Following a serious injury from being hit by a car, Ambrose Martin retired to a château he purchased in Brittany, France in 1938. Martin remained there for several years, from where he continued to run the Irish-Iberian Trading Company, now trading with Francoist Spain. He offered temporary shelter in his Breton manor to Basque nationalists fleeing Spain throughout the Second World War. Martin returned to Dublin after the war, living a relatively quiet life until a fatal heart attack in 1974.

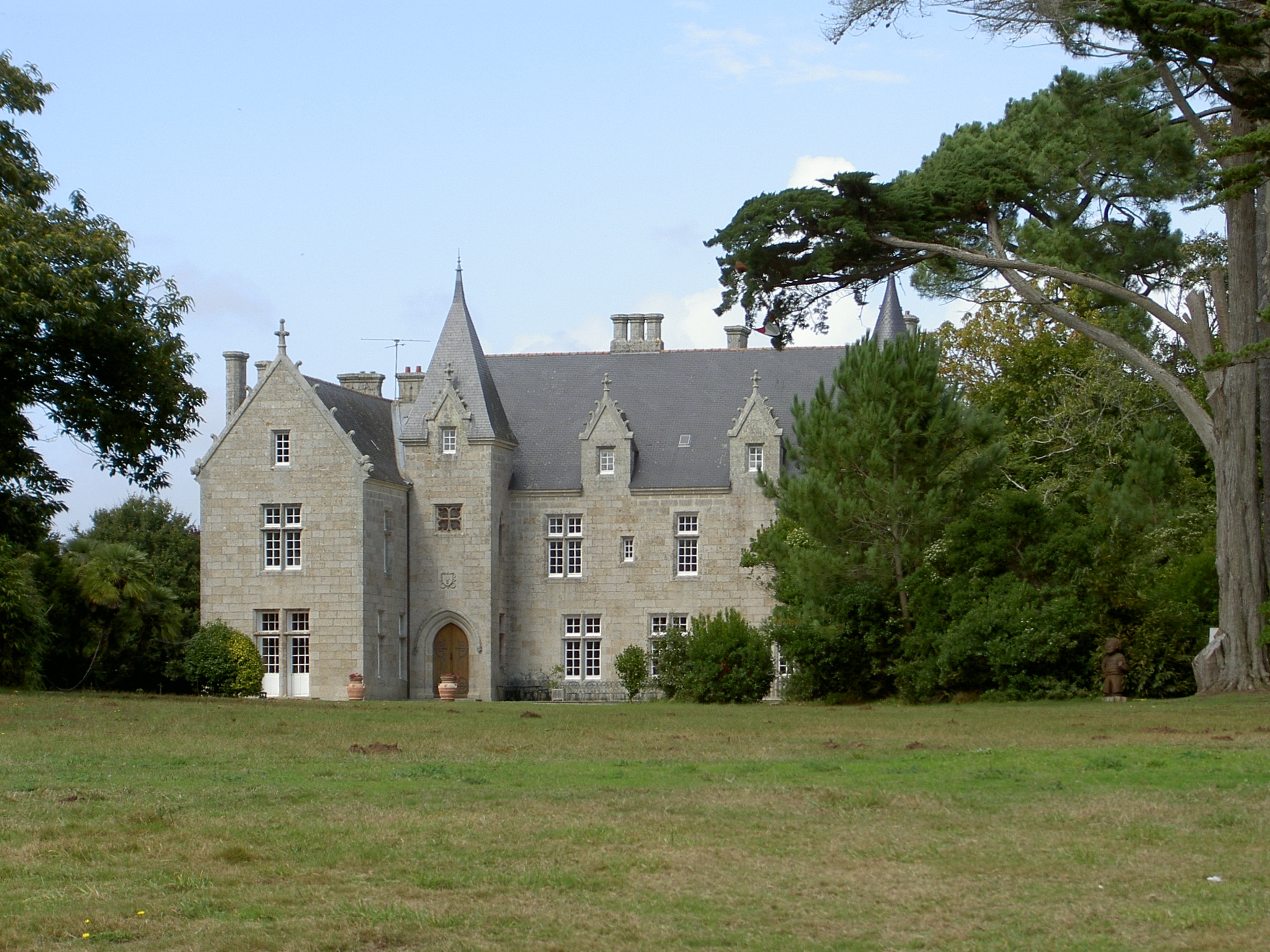
Kerlut manor
