= Government of the 1st Dáil =

Revolutionary government of the Irish Republic 1919 to 1921

The government of the 1st Dáil was the executive of the unilaterally declared Irish Republic. At the 1918 general election to Westminster, candidates for Sinn Féin stood on an abstentionist platform, declaring that they would not remain in the Parliament of the United Kingdom but instead form a unicameral, revolutionary parliament for Ireland called Dáil Éireann.

The first meeting of the First Dáil was held on 21 January 1919 in the Round Room of the Mansion House in Dublin and made a Declaration of Independence. It also approved the Dáil Constitution. Under Article 2 of this Constitution, there would be a ministry of Dáil Éireann led by a President, with five Secretaries leading government departments. There were two ministries of Dáil Éireann during the First Dáil. The 1st ministry (22 January to 1 April 1919) was led by Cathal Brugha and lasted for 69 days; it was formed when a large number of those elected for Sinn Féin were in prison. The 2nd ministry (1 April 1919 to 26 August 1921) was led by Éamon de Valera, leader of Sinn Féin, and lasted for 878 days.

== 1st ministry ==
Government of the 1st Dáil 1st ministry
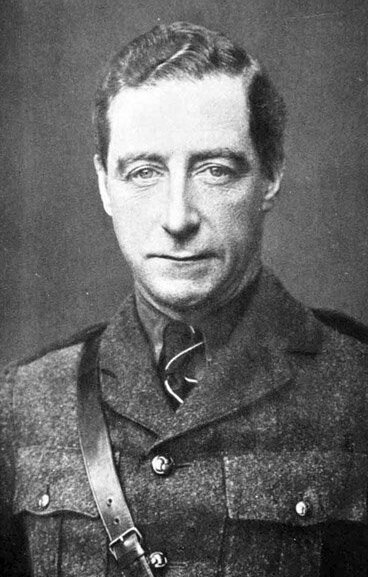
- Date formed: 22 January 1919
- Date dissolved: 1 April 1919

People and organisations
- President of Dáil Éireann: Cathal Brugha
- Total no. of members: 4
- Member party: Sinn Féin
- Status in legislature: Government

History
- Election: 1918 general election
- Legislature term: 1st Dáil
- Successor: 2nd ministry

The 1st ministry was a temporary cabinet headed by Cathal Brugha, because Éamon de Valera, the leader of Sinn Féin, was in prison at the time.

Office	Name
President of Dáil Éireann	Cathal Brugha
Minister for Finance	Eoin MacNeill
Minister for Home Affairs	Michael Collins
Minister for Foreign Affairs	Count Plunkett
Minister for National Defence	Richard Mulcahy

== 2nd ministry ==
Government of the 1st Dáil 2nd Ministry
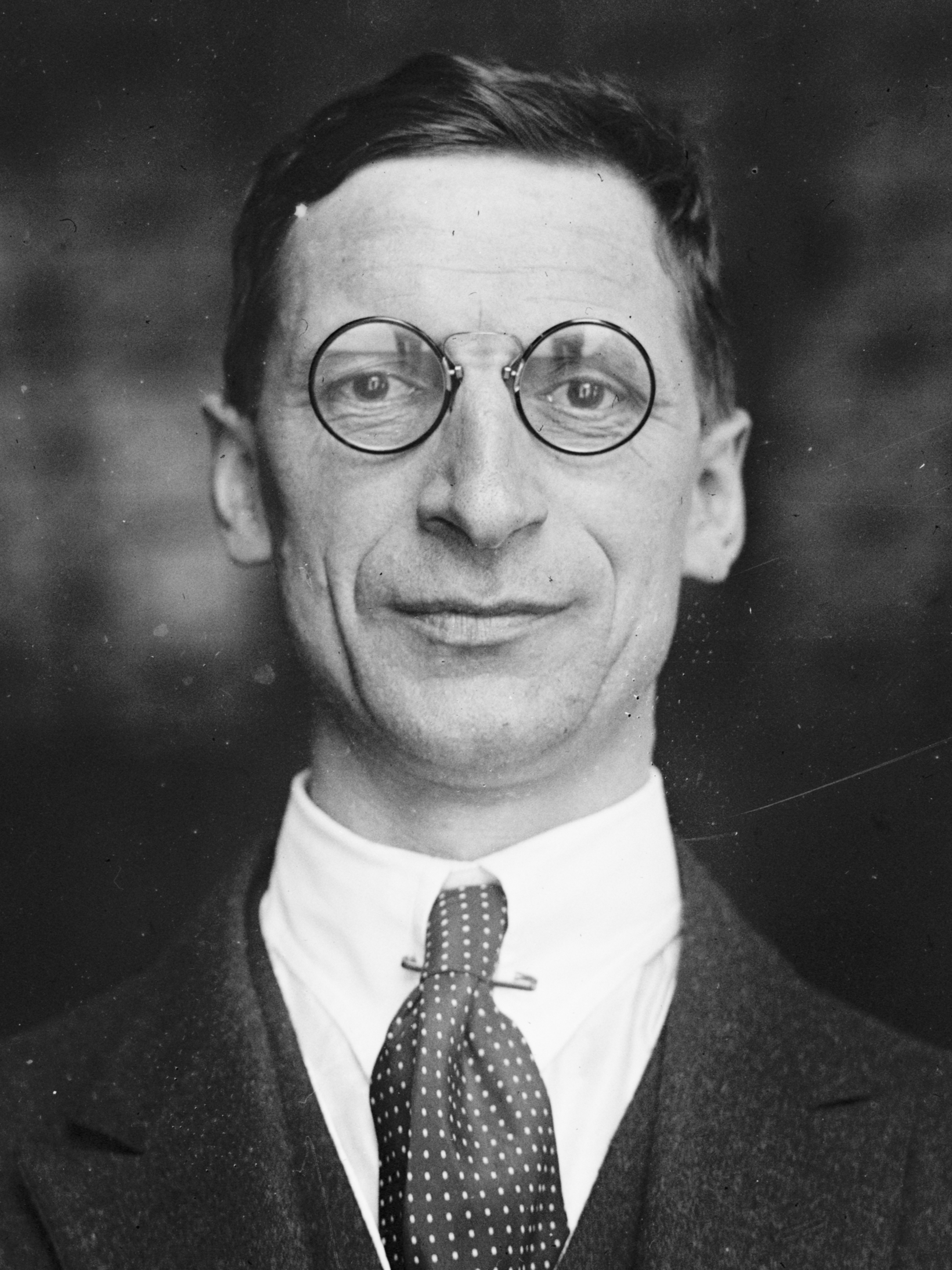
- Date formed: 1 April 1919
- Date dissolved: 26 August 1921

People and organisations
- President of Dáil Éireann: Éamon de Valera
- Deputy President: Arthur Griffith (from June 1919)
- Total no. of members: 12 (inc. 4 non-members of the cabinet)
- Member party: Sinn Féin
- Status in legislature: Government

History
- Legislature term: 1st Dáil
- Predecessor: 1st ministry
- Successor: 3rd ministry

On 1 April 1919, the 1st ministry resigned. On a motion proposed by Cathal Brugha and seconded by Pádraic Ó Máille, Éamon de Valera was declared elected as President of Dáil Éireann (Príomh Aire). The Constitution was amended to allow for up to nine members of the ministry, as well as the President. The following day, he formed the 2nd ministry. Countess Markievicz became the first Irish female cabinet minister. She served until 26 August 1921, and the next woman appointed to cabinet was Máire Geoghegan-Quinn, who was appointed as Minister for the Gaeltacht in 1979.

De Valera travelled to the United States in June 1919, and by letter requested that Arthur Griffith be appointed as Deputy President in his absence and that Ernest Blythe take a place at cabinet. De Valera resumed his position in the Dáil on 25 January 1921.

Office	Name
President of Dáil Éireann	Éamon de Valera
Secretary for Home Affairs	Arthur Griffith
Secretary for Defence	Cathal Brugha
Secretary for Foreign Affairs	Count Plunkett
Secretary for Labour	Constance Markievicz
Secretary for Industries	Eoin MacNeill
Secretary for Finance	Michael Collins
Secretary for Local Government	W. T. Cosgrave
=== Ministers not in cabinet ===
Office	Name
Director of Propaganda	Laurence Ginnell
Director of Agriculture	Robert Barton
=== Changes on 17 June 1919 ===
Office	Name
Deputy President	Arthur Griffith
Director of Trade and Commerce	Ernest Blythe
Substitute Director of Propaganda	Desmond FitzGerald
=== Changes on 27 October 1919 === On the arrest of Ernest Blythe.
Office	Name
Substitute Director of Trade and Commerce	Joseph McGuinness
=== Changes on 29 June 1920 === Appointment of new ministries and substitute ministries.
Office	Name
Minister for Irish	John J. O'Kelly
Acting Minister at the Ministry of Home Affairs	Austin Stack
Substitute Minister for Local Government	Kevin O'Higgins
Substitute Minister for Agriculture	Art O'Connor
Director of Fisheries	Seán Etchingham
=== Change on 17 September 1920 ===
Office	Name
Assistant Minister for Irish	Frank Fahy

=== Resignation of ministry ===
In May 1921, the Dáil passed a resolution declaring that elections to the House of Commons of Northern Ireland and the House of Commons of Southern Ireland would be used as the election for the Second Dáil.

The members of the 2nd Dáil first met on 16 August 1921. The outgoing ministry did not resign immediately. On 26 August 1921, Éamon de Valera resigned as president. De Valera was then re-elected, taking the new title of President of the Republic, and formed the 3rd ministry of Dáil Éireann.

== See also ==
- Dáil Éireann
- Government of Ireland
- Politics of the Republic of Ireland
- 1918 United Kingdom general election
