= Teachta Dála =

Member of Dáil Éireann

Teachta Dála of Dáil Éireann
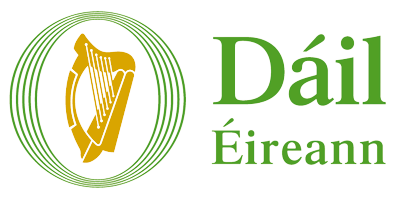

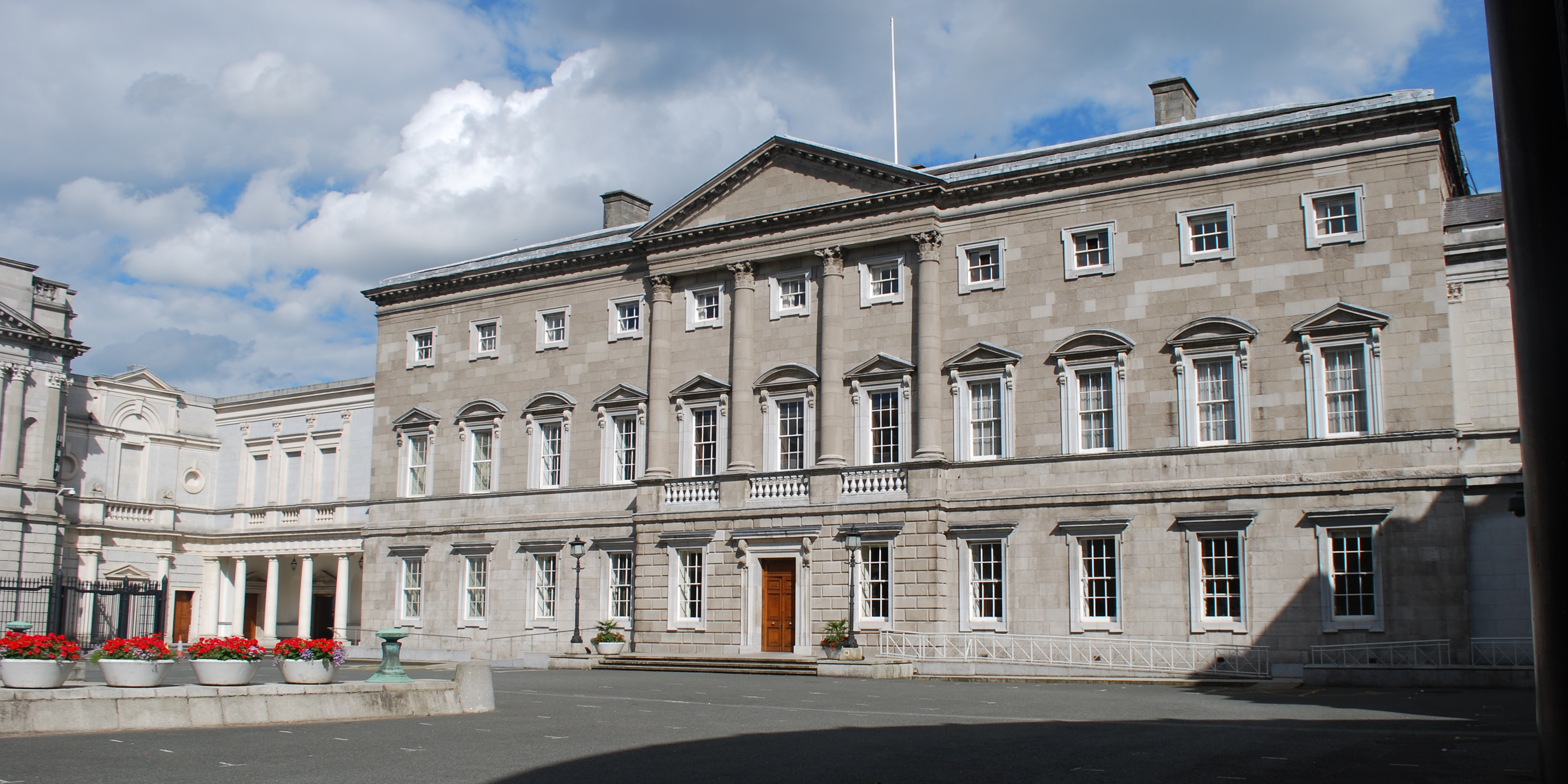
- Incumbent; 34th Dáil since 18 December 2024
- Oireachtas Éireann
- Style: Deputy (Irish: An Teachta)
- Abbreviation: TD
- Member of: Dáil Éireann
- Seat: Leinster House
- Appointer: Electorate of the Republic of Ireland
- Term length: No more than 5 years; renewable
- Constituting instrument: Articles 16−17, Constitution of Ireland
- Formation: 18 December 1918 (107 years ago)
- First holder: 1st Dáil
- Salary: €119,467 per year plus expenses
- Website: oireachtas.ie

A Teachta Dála (/ˌtjɒxtə ˈdɔːlə/ TYOKH-tə DAW-lə; Irish: [ˌtʲaxt̪ˠə ˈd̪ˠaːlˠə]; plural Teachtaí Dála), abbreviated as TD (plural TDanna in Irish, TDs in English), is a member of Dáil Éireann, the lower house of the Oireachtas, the parliament of Ireland. The official English translation of the term is "Dáil deputy".

== Number of TDs ==
Ireland is divided into Dáil constituencies, each of which elects three, four, or five TDs. Under the Constitution, the total number of TDs must be fixed at one TD for each 20,000 to 30,000 of the population. There are 174 TDs in the 34th Dáil, elected at the 2024 general election under the Electoral (Amendment) Act 2023. The outgoing Ceann Comhairle is automatically returned unless they announce their retirement before the dissolution of the Dáil.

== Qualification ==
A candidate for election as TD must be an Irish citizen and over 21 years of age. Members of the judiciary, the Garda Síochána, and the Permanent Defence Forces are disqualified from membership of the Dáil.

== History ==
The term was first used to describe those Irish parliamentarians who were elected at the 1918 general election, and who, rather than attending the British House of Commons at Westminster, to which they had been elected, assembled instead in the Mansion House in Dublin on 21 January 1919 to create a new Irish parliament: the First Dáil Éireann. Initially, the term Feisire Dáil Eireann (F.D.E.) was mooted, but 'Teachta' was used from the first meeting. The term continued to be used after this First Dáil and was used to refer to later members of the Irish Republic's single-chamber Dáil Éireann (or 'Assembly of Ireland') (1919–1922), members of the Free State Dáil (1922–1937), and of the modern Dáil Éireann.

== Style ==
The initials "TD" are placed after the surname of the elected TD. For example, the current Taoiseach (head of government) is "Micheál Martin, TD". The style used to refer to individual TDs during debates in Dáil Éireann is the member's surname preceded by Deputy (Irish: an Teachta): for example, "Deputy McDonald", "an Teachta Ní Dhomhnaill/Bhean Uí Dhomhnaill" or "an Teachta Ó Domhnaill".

== Salaries and expenses ==
The basic salary of a backbench TD is €119,467. Cabinet ministers and junior ministers receive additional allowances. Office-holders (opposition party leaders, whips, the Ceann Comhairle, and Leas-Cheann Comhairle) also receive additional allowances.

After controversy regarding alleged abuses of the Oireachtas expenses provisions, the system was simplified in 2009 and 2010 into two allowances:

- Travel and accommodation allowance – ranging from €9,000 for TDs less than 25 km from Leinster House to €34,065 for those more than 360 km away.
- Public Representation Allowance – for maintaining a constituency office; €20,350 for backbench TDs, less for ministers. All expenses must be vouched, except for a "petty cash" allowance of €100 per month. Until December 2012 TDs could choose between a €25,000 vouched allowance or €15,000 unvouched.

== See also ==
- Members of the 1st Dáil
- Records of members of the Oireachtas
