= Irish Declaration of Independence =

1919 Declaration of Irish independence

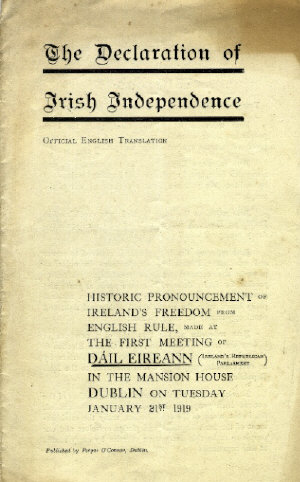
Cover page of the Declaration

The Declaration of Independence (Irish: Forógra na Saoirse, French: Déclaration d'indépendance) was a document adopted by Dáil Éireann, the revolutionary parliament of the Irish Republic, at its first meeting in the Mansion House, Dublin, on 21 January 1919. It followed from the Sinn Féin election manifesto of December 1918. Texts of the declaration were adopted in three languages: Irish, English and French.

== Scope ==
The Irish Republic claimed jurisdiction over the whole island of Ireland. The whole island of Ireland comprises 32 counties. It was rivalled by the British administration of the Lord Lieutenant of Ireland, but as the Irish War of Independence went on, it increased its legitimacy in the eyes of most Irish people. It was taken over by the Irish Free State in 1922, after the Anglo-Irish Treaty.

Under international law, the declaration satisfied the principle of the "declarative theory of statehood," but in 1919 almost all states followed the "constitutive theory of statehood" and therefore did not recognise the Irish Republic.

== Ratification of 1916 Proclamation ==
By the Declaration of Independence, the Dáil ratified the earlier Proclamation of the Irish Republic of Easter 1916. This proclamation had not been adopted by an elected body but merely by the Easter rebels claiming to act in the name of the Irish people. Unlike the proclamation, the Declaration of Independence was followed by the establishment of some de facto political organs. In its crucial line the declaration pronounced that:

..we, the elected Representatives of the ancient Irish people in National Parliament assembled, do, in the name of the Irish nation, ratify the establishment of the Irish Republic and pledge ourselves and our people to make this declaration effective by every means at our command

== English garrison ==
We solemnly declare foreign government in Ireland to be an invasion of our national right which we will never tolerate, and we demand the evacuation of our country by the English Garrison.

Differing meanings were given to the occupying 'English garrison'. This was the closest that the Irish Republic came to declaring war on Britain in January 1919, arguing that an invasion had taken place, and therefore any military action from then on was to remove the invaders. The government in London refused to take this as a declaration of war, considering that it was worded for an Irish audience. When the Irish War of Independence started with some haphazard shootings on the same day at Soloheadbeg, County Tipperary, it was treated by the British as a police matter. The Dáil had no claim to control the Irish Republican Army (IRA) until the latter swore an oath of allegiance to it in August 1920.

== 700 years ==
And Whereas for seven hundred years the Irish people has never ceased to repudiate and has repeatedly protested in arms against foreign usurpation.

This was based on the 'apostolic succession' of revolts against the English and later, British administrations, placing the last fully free Ireland in the Gaelic world of about the 1160s, before the Anglo-Norman invasion of Ireland of 1168–71. The declaration saw the wars and revolts of 1594–1603, 1641–50, 1689–91, 1798, 1803, 1848, 1867 and 1916 as a continuing attempt at regaining Irish self-government, with or without links to the crown.

== Aim of international recognition ==
We claim for our national independence the recognition and support of every free nation in the world, and we proclaim that independence to be a condition precedent to international peace hereafter:

An important element in the 1918 Sinn Féin election manifesto was to secure recognition at the forthcoming peace conference that would end the World War of 1914 to 1918. President Woodrow Wilson of the United States had suggested that the Versailles Peace Conference would be inclusive and even-handed, but his "Fourteen Points" had called for "equal weight" between parties at arbitration in article 5, and not outright declarations of independence.

In June 1920, a "Draft Treaty between the new Russian Soviet Federative Socialist Republic and the Republic of Ireland" was circulated in Dublin. E. H. Carr, the historian of early Bolshevism, considered that "... the negotiations were not taken very seriously on either side." The RSFSR was a pariah state at the time.

== See also ==
On the same day the First Dáil adopted the:

- Dáil Constitution
- Message to the Free Nations of the World
- Democratic Programme
