= Message to the Free Nations of the World =

1919 Irish appeal for nationhood

In 1919 the First Dáil of the Irish Republic issued a Message to the Free Nations of the World (Irish: Scéal ó Dháil Éireann chum Saor-Náisiún an Domhain, French: Appel aux Nations). The message was approved by Dáil Éireann on 21 January 1919. It asked nations to recognise Ireland as a separate nation, free from British rule. It was adopted in three languages: Irish, English and French.

Little attention was paid to it by the free nations as World War I was ending. An Armistice had been signed, but the war technically ended with the Treaty of Versailles which was signed in June 1919. Britain assured its fellow victors that the situation in Ireland would be dealt with under the new principles of self-determination, and so significant Irish support in America was negated by President Wilson who would not recognise the sovereignty of the Irish Republic. The British solution was enacted in 1920 as the Government of Ireland Act 1920. The Irish Republic was not recognised by any other state.

== The text of the Message to the Free Nations of the World (English) ==
To the Nations of the World—Greeting

The Nation of Ireland, having proclaimed her national independence, calls, through her elected representatives in Parliament assembled in the Irish Capital on January 21, 1919, upon every free nation to support the Irish Republic by recognising Ireland's national status and her right to its vindication at the Peace Congress.

Naturally, the race, the language, the customs and traditions of Ireland are radically distinct from the English. Ireland is one of the most ancient nations in Europe, and she has preserved her national integrity, vigorous and intact, through seven centuries of foreign oppression; she has never relinquished her national rights, and throughout the long era of English usurpation she has in every generation defiantly proclaimed her inalienable right of nationhood down to her last glorious resort to arms in 1916.

Internationally, Ireland is the gateway to the Atlantic; Ireland is the last outpost of Europe towards the West; Ireland is the point upon which great trade routes between East and West converge; her independence is demanded by the Freedom of the Seas; her great harbours must be open to all nations, instead of being the monopoly of England. Today, these harbours are empty and idle solely because English policy is determined to retain Ireland as a barren bulwark for English aggrandisement, and the unique geographical position of this island, far from being a benefit and safeguard to Europe and America, is subjected to the purposes of England's policy of world domination.

Ireland today reasserts her historic nationhood the more confidently before the new world emerging from the war, because she believes in freedom and justice as the fundamental principles of international law; because she believes in a frank co-operation between the peoples for equal rights against the vested privileges of ancient tyrannies; because the permanent peace of Europe can never be secured by perpetuating military dominion for the profit of empire but only by establishing the control of government in every land upon the basis of the free will of a free people, and the existing state of war, between Ireland and England, can never be ended until Ireland is definitely evacuated by the armed forces of England.

For these among other reasons, Ireland—resolutely and irrevocably determined at the dawn of the promised era of self-determination and liberty that she will suffer foreign dominion no longer—calls upon every free nation to uphold her national claim to complete independence as an Irish Republic against the arrogant pretensions of England founded in fraud and sustained only by an overwhelming military occupation, and demands to be confronted publicly with England at the Congress of the Nations, that the civilised world having judged between English wrong and Irish right may guarantee to Ireland its permanent support for the maintenance of her national independence.

== See also ==
- Foreign relations of the Republic of Ireland
