= Soloheadbeg ambush =

1919 IRA attack on Irish police

- Part of the Irish War of Independence
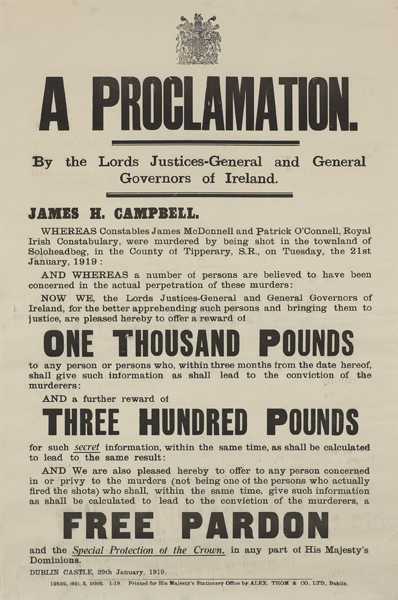
- A proclamation offering a reward of £1,000 for information leading to the capture of those involved in the Soloheadbeg ambush
Date	21 January 1919
Location	Soloheadbeg, County Tipperary, Ireland 52°30′38″N 8°09′47″W
Result	IRA seize large amounts of gelignite

Belligerents
Irish Volunteers/Irish Republican Army	United Kingdom: Royal Irish Constabulary

Commanders and leaders
Seán Treacy; Dan Breen	(United Kingdom of Great Britain and Ireland) James McDonnell † (United Kingdom of Great Britain and Ireland) Patrick O'Connell †

Strength
10 volunteers	2 policemen

Casualties and losses
None	2 policemen killed
- Location within island of Ireland

The Soloheadbeg ambush took place on 21 January 1919, when members of the Irish Volunteers (soon to be called the Irish Republican Army or IRA), ambushed Royal Irish Constabulary (RIC) officers who were escorting a consignment of gelignite explosives at Soloheadbeg, County Tipperary. Two RIC officers were killed and their weapons and the explosives were stolen. The Volunteers acted on their own initiative and had not sought authorisation for their action. As it happened on the same day that the revolutionary Irish parliament first met and declared Ireland's independence, it is often seen as the first engagement of the Irish War of Independence.

== Background ==
In April 1916, during the First World War, Irish republicans launched an uprising against British rule in Ireland, called the Easter Rising, where they proclaimed an Irish Republic. After a week of fighting, mostly in Dublin, the rising was put down by British forces. Most of the Rising's leaders were executed. The Rising, the British response, and the British attempt to introduce conscription in Ireland led to even greater public support for Irish republicanism.

In the general election of December 1918, the Irish republican party Sinn Féin won a landslide victory in Ireland, gaining 73 out of 105 seats (25 of these unopposed) in the British Parliament. However, in its election manifesto, the party had vowed to set up a separate government in Ireland rather than sit in the British Parliament. At a meeting in Dublin on 21 January 1919, Sinn Féin established an independent parliament called Dáil Éireann and declared independence from the United Kingdom.

== Planning ==
That same day, an ambush would be carried out by Irish Volunteers from the 3rd Tipperary Brigade. It involved Seán Treacy, Dan Breen, Seán Hogan, Séumas Robinson, Tadhg Crowe, Patrick McCormack, Patrick O'Dwyer and Michael Ryan. Robinson (who had participated in the Easter Rising) was the commander of the group that carried out the attack and Treacy (a member of the Irish Republican Brotherhood since 1911) coordinated its planning. The unit involved acted on its own initiative.

In December 1918, the Volunteers received information that a consignment of gelignite was to be moved from Tipperary British Army barracks to the Soloheadbeg quarry. Breen's younger brother and fellow republican Laurence ("Lar"), who worked at the quarry, received information that the consignment was to be moved around 16 January 1919. In anticipation of an armed escort of from two to six people, the guerrillas believed they could overpower the RIC officers without firing a shot. Gags and ropes were hidden in the quarry, so that if the officers surrendered they could be bound and gagged. The planning for the ambush took place in the 'Tin Hut', a deserted semi-derelict house at Greenane.

Robinson, who had returned to the Brigade area after his release from jail, supported Treacy's plan to seize the gelignite and confirmed that permission would not be sought from the Irish Volunteer leadership. If they were to, they would have to wait for a response; and even if the response was affirmative, it might not come until after the gelignite was moved.

== Ambush ==
Each day from 16 to 21 January, the men chosen for the ambush took up their positions from early in the morning to late afternoon and then spent the night at the deserted house. Seven of the Volunteers were armed with revolvers while Treacy was armed with a small automatic rifle. On 21 January, around noon, Patrick O'Dwyer saw the transport leaving the barracks. The consignment of 160 lb of gelignite was on a horse-drawn cart, led by two council men and guarded by two RIC officers armed with carbine rifles. O'Dwyer cycled quickly to where the ambush party was waiting and informed them. Robinson and O'Dwyer hid about 20 yards in front of the main ambush party of six, in case they rushed through the main ambush position.

When the transport reached the position where the main ambush party was hiding, masked Volunteers stepped out in front of them with their guns drawn and called on the RIC to surrender, shouting "Hands up!" more than once. It was raining. The officers could see at least three of the ambushers; one officer got down behind the cart and the other apparently fumbled with his rifle. According to the Volunteers, the officers raised their rifles to fire at them. Séumas Robinson said the officers attempted to shoot but that the rifles did not fire because "the cut-off had been overlooked". The Volunteers immediately fired at the officers, and it is believed that Treacy fired the first shot. Both officers were killed: James McDonnell and Patrick O'Connell, native Roman Catholics. McDonnell was shot in the left side of the head and through the left arm; O’Connell was shot through the left side, and was likely in a stooping position. McDonnell was born in Belmullet, County Mayo. He was aged 50 at the time of his death and was a widower with five children. O'Connell was unmarried and a native of Coachford, County Cork.

As planned, Hogan, Breen and Treacy took the horse and cart with the explosives and sped off. They hid the explosives in a field in Greenane. The explosives were moved several times and later divided up between the battalions of the brigade. Tadhg Crowe and Patrick O'Dwyer took the guns and ammunition from the dead officers, while Robinson, McCormack and Ryan guarded the two council workers, Ned Godfrey and Patrick Flynn, before releasing them once the gelignite was far enough away.

Breen gave apparently conflicting accounts of their intentions that day. One account implies that the purpose of the confrontation was merely to capture explosives and detonators being escorted to a nearby quarry. However, almost thirty years later he told the Bureau of Military History that he and Treacy intended killing the police escort to provoke a military response.

"Treacy had stated to me that the only way of starting a war was to kill someone, and we wanted to start a war, so we intended to kill some of the police whom we looked upon as the foremost and most important branch of the enemy forces [...] The only regret we had following the ambush was that there were only two policemen in it, instead of the six we had expected".

Séumas Robinson said that they would not have "shot down men in cold blood, although certainly we had no intention of being intimidated by the armed guard". Patrick O'Dwyer said the plan had been to "disarm them and seize the gelignite without bloodshed if possible", and Tadhg Crowe said they did not believe the ambush would end in violence.

== Aftermath ==
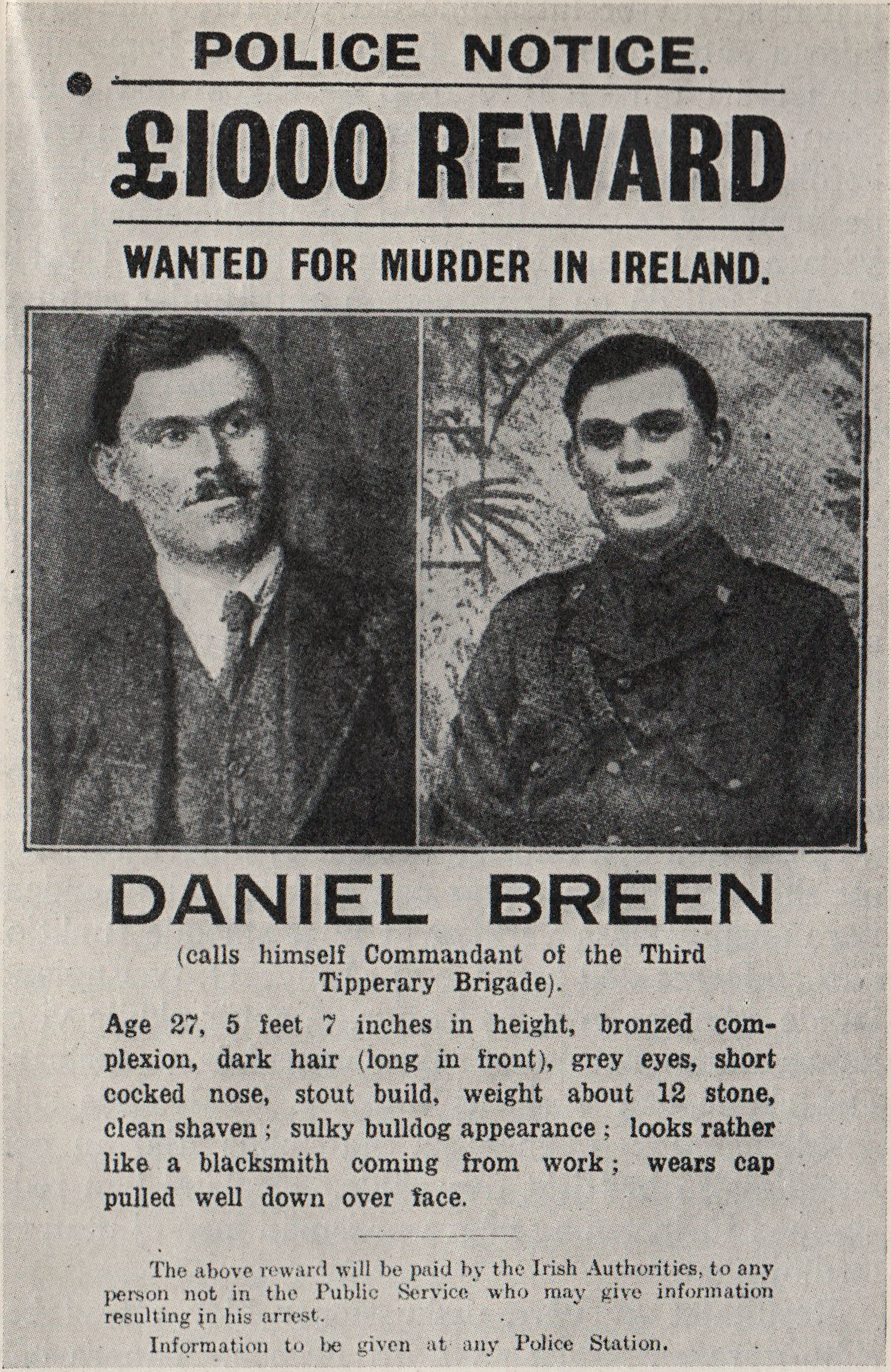
A wanted poster for Dan Breen.

The ambush would later be seen as the beginning of the Irish War of Independence. The British government declared South Tipperary a Special Military Area under the Defence of the Realm Act two days later. There was strong condemnation from the Catholic Church in Ireland. The parish priest of Tipperary Town called the dead officers "martyrs to duty".

A meeting of the Executive of the Irish Volunteers took place shortly thereafter. On 31 January, An t-Óglach (the official publication of the Irish Volunteers) stated that the formation of Dáil Éireann "justifies Irish Volunteers in treating the armed forces of the enemy – whether soldiers or policemen – exactly as a National Army would treat the members of an invading army".

In February 1919 at a Brigade meeting in Nodstown Tipperary, Brigade officers drafted a proclamation (signed by Seamus Robinson as O/C) ordering all British military and police forces out of South Tipperary and, if they stayed they would be held to have "forfeited their lives". GHQ refused to sanction the proclamation and demanded it not be publicly displayed. Despite this it was still posted in several places in Tipperary.

In order to avoid capture, Breen, Treacy, Hogan and the other participants were forced to stay on the move for the following months, often hiding in the barns and attics of sympathisers.

=== Commemoration ===
A monument was erected at the site of the ambush, and each year, a ceremony of remembrance is held there.

== See also ==
- Timeline of the Irish War of Independence
- Rescue at Knocklong

== Bibliography ==
- Abbot, R. Police Casualties in Ireland (1919-1922). p. 30–32 (ISBN 1856353141)
- Aengus Ó Snodaigh (21 January 1999). "Gearing up for war: Soloheadbeg 1919". An Phoblacht.
