= Irish Republic =

Irish state that declared its independence from the United Kingdom (1916, 1919–1922)

Irish Republic Poblacht na hÉireann Saorstát Éireann
- 1916; Disputed with the United Kingdom; 1919–1922; Disputed with the United Kingdom
- Flag Proclamation flag
- Anthem: God Save Ireland (unofficial, popular)
- Territory claimed by the Irish Republic
- Status: Revolutionary state
- Capital: Dublin; 53°20′25″N 6°15′28″W
- Common languages: Irish, English
- Government: Parliamentary republic
- President of Dáil Éireann (to August 1921); President of the Irish Republic (from August 1921)
  - 21 – 1 January April 1919: Cathal Brugha
  - April 1919 – January 1922: Éamon de Valera
  - January–August 1922: Arthur Griffith
  - August–December 1922: W. T. Cosgrave
- Legislature: Dáil

Establishment
- Historical era: Interwar period
  - Easter Rising: 24–29 April 1916
  - Proclamation of the Irish Republic: 24 April 1916
  - Independence declared: 21 January 1919
  - Anglo–Irish War: 1919–1921
  - Anglo-Irish Treaty adopted: 7 January 1922
  - Irish Free State established: 6 December 1922
- Currency: Pound sterling
Preceded by	Succeeded by
United Kingdom of Great Britain and Ireland	Irish Free State; Northern Ireland
- Today part of: Republic of Ireland; United Kingdom

The Irish Republic (Irish: Poblacht na hÉireann or Saorstát Éireann) was a revolutionary state that declared its independence from the United Kingdom of Great Britain and Ireland in January 1919. The Republic claimed jurisdiction over the whole island of Ireland, but by 1920 its functional control was limited to 21 of Ireland's 32 counties, and British state forces maintained a presence across much of the north-east, as well as Cork, Dublin and other major towns. The republic was strongest in rural areas, and through its military forces was able to influence the population in urban areas that it did not directly control.

Its origins date back to the Easter Rising of 1916, when Irish republicans seized key locations in Dublin and proclaimed an Irish Republic. The rebellion was crushed, but the survivors united under a reformed Sinn Féin party to campaign for a republic. In the 1918 United Kingdom general election, the party won a clear majority of the constituencies in Ireland; in many seats Sinn Féin candidates did not face meaningful opposition. The Sinn Féin winners did not take their seats in the U.K. parliament, but instead gathered in Dublin on 21 January 1919 to form the First Dáil (legislature) of Ireland. Republicans then established a government, a court system and a police force. At the same time, the Irish Volunteers, who came under the control of the Dáil and became known as the Irish Republican Army, fought against British state forces in the Irish War of Independence.

The War of Independence ended with the Anglo-Irish Treaty, signed on 6 December 1921 and narrowly approved by Dáil Éireann on 7 January 1922. A Provisional Government was set up under the terms of the treaty, but the Irish Republic nominally remained in existence until 6 December 1922, when 26 of the island's 32 counties became a self-governing British dominion called the Irish Free State. The island had been partitioned by the Government of Ireland Act 1920, and the six counties of Northern Ireland, which had been partitioned so as to create and ensure a unionist majority, exercised their right under the treaty to opt out of the Free State, and remain in the United Kingdom.

== Name ==
In English, the revolutionary state was to be known as the "Irish Republic". Two different Irish language titles were used: Poblacht na hÉireann and Saorstát Éireann, based on two alternative Irish translations of the word "republic". The word poblacht was newly coined by the writers of the Easter Proclamation in 1916. Saorstát was a compound word, based on the Irish words saor ("free") and stát ("state"). Its literal translation was "free state". The term Poblacht na hÉireann is the one used in the Proclamation of 1916, but the Declaration of Independence and other documents adopted in 1919 used Saorstát Éireann.

Saorstát Éireann was adopted as the official Irish title of the Irish Free State when it was established at the end of the Irish War of Independence, although this Free State was not a republic but a form of constitutional monarchy within the British Empire. Since then, the word saorstát has fallen out of use as a translation of "republic". After the Irish state had changed its name to "Ireland", in 1949 the description of the state was declared "Republic of Ireland", while in Irish it was translated as Poblacht na hÉireann.

In his memoir, Winston Churchill gives an account of the first meeting of Éamon de Valera (then the president of Dáil Éireann) with David Lloyd George (then the prime minister of the United Kingdom) on 14 July 1921, at which Churchill was present. Lloyd George was a native speaker of Welsh and a noted Welsh linguist, and as such was interested in the literal meaning of Saorstát. De Valera replied that it meant 'Free State'. Lloyd George asked, "What is your Irish word for Republic?" After what Churchill characterized as some delay and no reply from de Valera, Lloyd George commented: "Must we not admit that the Celts never were Republicans and have no native word for such an idea?"

Lord Longford gives a different account in Peace by Ordeal: "The only doubt in de Valera's mind, as he explained to Lloyd George, arose from the current dispute among Gaelic purists whether the idea Republic was better conveyed by the broader 'Saorstát' or the more abstract 'Poblacht'."

== Establishment ==
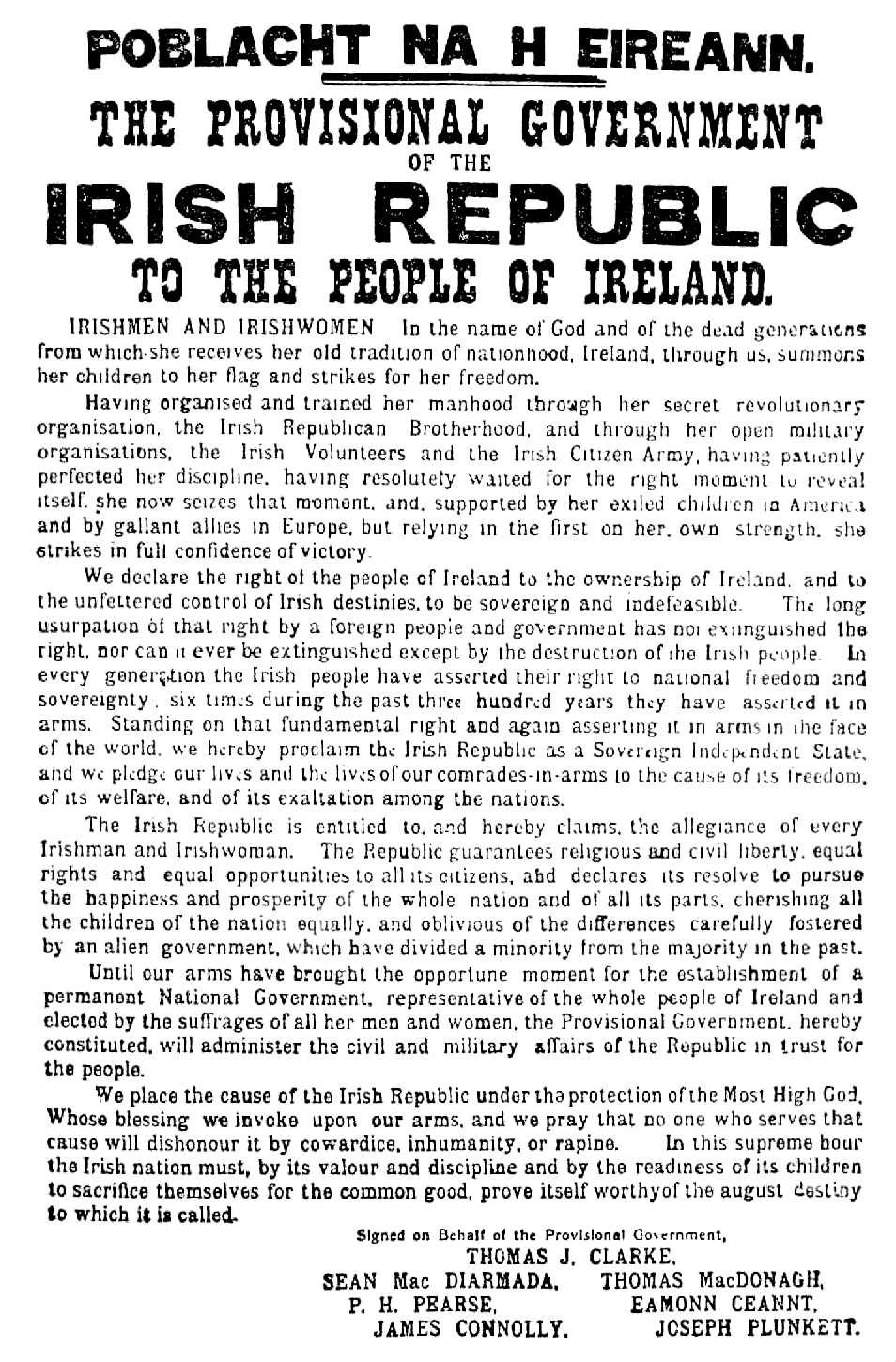
A retouched copy of the original Proclamation

In 1916, nationalist rebels participating in the Easter Rising issued the Proclamation of the Republic. By this declaration, they claimed to establish an independent state called the "Irish Republic", and proclaimed that the leaders of the rebellion would serve as the "Provisional Government of the Irish Republic" until it became possible to elect a national parliament. The Easter Rising was short-lived, largely limited to Dublin and, at the time it occurred, enjoyed little support from the Irish general public.

The leaders of the Easter Rising had proclaimed a republic. Arthur Griffith's Sinn Féin organisation, which had favoured the establishment of a form of dual monarchy between Ireland and Britain, had not taken part in the Rising. In 1917, Griffith's Sinn Féin and republicans under Éamon de Valera came together to form the new Sinn Féin Party. A compromise was reached at the 1917 Ard Fheis (party conference), where it was agreed that the party would pursue the establishment of an independent republic in the short term, until the Irish people could be given the opportunity to decide on the form of government they preferred. This agreement was subject to the condition that if the people chose monarchy, no member of the British royal family would be invited to serve as monarch.

In the 1918 general election, candidates of the radical Sinn Féin party—including many who had participated in the 1916 rebellion—issued a manifesto which included the statement: "Sinn Féin aims at securing the establishment of that Republic". It also said it would boycott the British Parliament and instead unilaterally establish a new Irish assembly in Dublin. Sinn Féin candidates won a large majority of the seats: 73 out of 105, 25 of them uncontested. On 21 January 1919, 27 of them gathered in the Mansion House in Dublin to establish Dáil Éireann. Thirty-five other members were recorded as being fé ghlas ag Gallaibh (imprisoned by the foreign enemy) and another four as ar díbirt ag Gallaibh (deported by the foreign enemy). Thirty-seven others were recorded as not being present (as láthair), these were mainly from the northern six counties that would later form Northern Ireland. At this meeting, the Dáil adopted the Irish Declaration of Independence. Because of the Easter Proclamation of 1916, the Dáil retrospectively established the Irish Republic from Easter 1916.

On the same day as the Declaration of Independence was issued, two members of the Royal Irish Constabulary (RIC) escorting a cartload of gelignite were killed in the Tipperary Soloheadbeg Ambush, carried out by members of the 3rd Tipperary Brigade of the Irish Volunteers, led by Dan Breen and Seán Treacy. This ambush had not been ordered by the Dáil, but the course of events soon drove the Dáil to recognise the Volunteers as the army of the Irish Republic, and so the Soloheadbeg incident became the opening incident of the undeclared Anglo-Irish War between the Volunteers and Great Britain. Breen later recalled: "Treacy had stated to me that the only way of starting a war was to kill someone, so we intended to kill some of the police."

The decision to establish a republic in 1919, rather than any other form of government, was significant because it amounted to a complete repudiation of all constitutional ties with Great Britain, and set the party against any compromise that might involve initial self-government under the Home Rule Act 1914 or continued membership of the British Empire. One obstacle to this decision—that the Unionists of the north-east had long indicated that they would never participate in any form of a republic—was left unresolved, the six north-eastern counties remaining part of the United Kingdom under the Government of Ireland Act 1920, and later the Anglo-Irish Treaty.

== Institutions of government ==
=== Dáil Éireann ===
The central institution of the republic was Dáil Éireann, a unicameral assembly formed by the majority of Irish Members of Parliament elected in the 1918 general election. Two further general elections called by the Lord Lieutenant of Ireland, the head of the British Dublin Castle administration, were treated by nationalists as elections to the Dáil. The Second Dáil comprised members returned in the 1921 elections for the Parliaments of Northern Ireland and Southern Ireland; the Third Dáil was elected at the 1922 general election as the "provisional parliament" of "Southern Ireland", as provided for by the Anglo-Irish Treaty.

At its first meeting the Dáil adopted a brief, provisional constitution known as the Dáil Constitution, as well as a series of basic laws, notably the Democratic Programme. It also passed a Declaration of Independence.

=== Ministry ===
The Dáil Constitution vested executive authority in a cabinet called the Ministry of Dáil Éireann (or Aireacht in Irish). The Ministry was answerable to the Dáil which elected its head, known initially as the president of Dáil Éireann (Príomh Aire). He in turn appointed the ministers. According to the original version of the constitution enacted in January 1919, there were to be four ministers:

1. Minister of Finance (Aire Airgid)
2. Minister of Home Affairs (Aire Gnóthaí Duthchais)
3. Minister of Foreign Affairs (Aire Gnóthaí Coigcríoch)
4. Minister of National Defence (Aire Cosanta)

In April 1919, the ministry was increased in size to not more than nine ministers. In August 1921, it was changed again with the title President of the Republic used, suggesting a position of head of state. A ministry of six was created. These were:

1. Minister of Finance
2. Minister of Foreign Affairs
3. Minister of Home Affairs
4. Minister of Defence
5. Minister of Local Government
6. Minister of Economic Affairs

A number of previous cabinet ministers, notably Constance Markievicz, were demoted to under-secretary level.

The Ministry met as often as secrecy and safety allowed.

=== Heads of state and government ===
Initially, partly because of the division between republicans and monarchists, the Irish Republic had no head of state. The Republic's leader was known initially as the Príomh Aire, literally "prime minister" but referred to in the English version of the constitution as "President of the Ministry". Later the English title "President of Dáil Éireann" also came to be used for the same post, especially during President de Valera's tour of the United States. On 26 August 1921, de Valera had the Dáil appoint him to the new post of "President of the Republic", so that he would be regarded as the head of state in the forthcoming Treaty negotiations. This was to assert the claim that the negotiations were between two sovereign states (Ireland's view), and not that it was between the British government and local politicians (Britain's view). After de Valera's resignation in January 1922, his successors Griffith and Cosgrave called themselves "President of Dáil Éireann".

=== Military ===
The military branch of the Irish Republic were the Irish Volunteers who, in the course of the War of Independence, who were formally renamed the "Irish Republican Army" to reflect their status as the national army of the declared republic. Despite being theoretically under the command of the Dáil's Ministry, in practice individual IRA columns enjoyed a high level of autonomy, subject to H.Q. in Dublin. Arrangements were made in August 1920 for the volunteers to swear an oath of allegiance to the Dáil.

=== Judiciary and police ===
The judicial arm of the Irish Republic consisted of a network of Dáil Courts administered by IRA officers, which at first operated in parallel with the British judicial system, and gradually came to supersede it as public opinion swung against the British in some parts of the island. British law allowed for the arbitration of disputes, provided the parties agreed to it, and as the Dáil Courts were initially described as arbitration panels it was impossible to outlaw them. In other cases the Dáil Courts proved more popular because of the speed and efficiency of their functioning, compared to the local Assize courts. They proved unable to deal with violent crimes but acquired a good reputation with farmers, particularly in dealing harshly with cases of cattle rustling.

The enforcement of law and the decrees of the Dáil Courts was vested in the Irish Republican Police.

== Functionality ==
The Irish Republic had some of the attributes of a functioning state; a ministry (with a head of state in the latter stages), a parliament, a courts system, a police force and a constitution. The extent to which these functioned fluctuated in different parts of the island, with the success or otherwise of republican institutions depending both on the degree of control of the IRA in the region and on the brutality of the Black and Tans and Auxiliaries, active from June 1920 to July 1921. The more brutal the 'Tans' the more they alienated the local populace from the Dublin Castle administration and Assize courts and the greater success the republican alternatives had. Some measures such as the Dáil Decree of 6 August 1920 prohibiting emigration without a permit were violently enforced.

At the height of the Irish War of Independence, as atrocities committed by the Black and Tans reached such a scale as to result in the burning of the city of Cork (leading to widespread criticism in the United States and from King George V), the Republican Police and Dáil courts reached their zenith, and senior barristers who had qualified within the British courts system also represented defendants in the Dáil Courts. But even after the Truce of July 1921, when the Tans had stopped their activities, the continuing effectiveness of the Dáil courts and police was seen to be patchy. This was in part due to standing down the Royal Irish Constabulary (RIC) in early 1922 before a new police force was ready to operate; in the interim the Irish Republican Army (IRA), dividing within itself over the Treaty, was the only police force.

The main function of the Dáil courts was in resolving civil cases and very rarely dealt with criminal matters. The cabinet met frequently, though necessarily in secret, and dealt with everyday matters as well as the conduct of the war. The Dáil sat for 21 days before the Truce of July 1921, and more frequently after that.

Support for the Republic, though it ebbed and flowed constantly during the war, was strongest in the south of the country. The claim to authority of the Irish Republic was rejected in Unionist-dominated Northern Ireland and south County Dublin.

== Recognition ==
Efforts by President de Valera in the United States and by the Republic's "ambassador" at the Versailles Peace Conference, Seán T. O'Kelly, to win international recognition failed. O'Kelly had already established the Republic's "embassy" in Paris in April 1919, and Dr. Patrick McCartan set one up in Washington, D.C. at the same time. Despite heavy lobbying from prominent Irish-Americans, President Woodrow Wilson refused to raise the Irish case at the conference as he did not want to antagonise the British. Finally in June "Ireland's demand for recognition" was conveyed to Georges Clemenceau, the Conference Chairman, without effect.

In June 1920, a "Draft Treaty between the new Russian Socialist Federative Soviet Republic and the Republic of Ireland" was circulated in Dublin. E. H. Carr, the historian of early Bolshevism, considered that "… the negotiations were not taken very seriously on either side."

The issue of recognition raises the question of how much the new Dáil, particularly de Valera, fully appreciated the developing relationship between the victorious powers following the war. Wilson had promised self-determination for nations and international norms were changing. Article V. of Wilson's 'Fourteen Points' outlined in January 1918 did not, however, promise that all colonies would be decolonised on demand at the end of the war, but that a colonial population's claim for arbitration would have "equal weight" with any claim by its government. In declaring independence unilaterally for the whole island, the new republic had denied "equal weight" to the wishes of Britain or the Irish loyalists. Having misunderstood or misread this part of Wilson's formula, the Dáil still required his support against his main ally.

The obvious problem was that the Irish Republic's Declaration of Independence of January 1919 was hostile to Britain, which was one of the four main powers arranging terms at Versailles. The RSFSR was also not invited to Versailles. Although armistices were holding, World War I was technically unfinished until the treaties ending it were signed, starting with Germany on 28 June 1919. The British view was that the 69 new Sinn Féin members of parliament had chosen not to take their seats at Westminster (to the relief of the Conservative Party), and that an Irish settlement would be arranged after the more important treaties with the former Central Powers had been signed off, involving Sinn Féin as the representatives of the majority, whether or not it had proclaimed a republic.

The Irish Republic was never recognised by the British government. Because its original contents were not seen as workable, the government under David Lloyd George abandoned plans to amend the Third Home Rule Act enacted in 1914, having called the Irish Convention in 1917–18. The British cabinet started in September 1919 to work from Walter Long's 1918 proposals, and in December 1920 they enacted the Government of Ireland Act 1920. This allowed for two home rule Irelands, partitioning Ireland into Northern Ireland and Southern Ireland. Each Ireland was to have a two bicameral parliaments, with a shared chief executive, the Lord Lieutenant of Ireland, and a Council of Ireland which was intended to be an embryonic all-Ireland single parliament. The proposal was greeted with mild enthusiasm among Irish Unionists in the new Northern Ireland, who had never sought their own home rule, but was rejected by a combination of Irish Republicans, Irish Nationalists and Irish Unionists who were not in Northern Ireland. While rejecting the right of the British parliament to legislate for Ireland, Sinn Féin took the opportunity of the two general elections in May 1921, one in the north and one in the south, to seek a renewed mandate for the Republic. No contests resulted in the south, with all seats returning the nominated Sinn Féin candidate apart from Dublin University. The new Northern Ireland parliament in Belfast first sat on 7 June 1921 with a large Ulster Unionist majority and, while it did not formally recognise the Republic, its premier, Sir James Craig, had secretly met with Éamon de Valera in Dublin in May 1921. This was a de facto recognition of de Valera's position, but also recognition by de Valera that Craig could not be ignored.

The Truce signed between representatives of the Dáil and Britain was agreed on 9 July 1921, to become effective from noon on 11 July. This marked the end of the Irish War of Independence. On 14 July 1921 Éamon de Valera met David Lloyd George in London for the first time to find some common ground for a settlement. He had been invited as: "the chosen leader of the great majority in Southern Ireland", but tried to extend this to a British recognition of the republic. Lloyd George made it clear to him, 'that the achievement of a republic through negotiation was impossible'. In August, in preparation for the formalities, de Valera had the Dáil upgrade his status from prime minister to full President of the Republic. As a head of state he then accredited envoys plenipotentiary, an accreditation approved by the Dáil. This accreditation gave them the legal ability to sign a treaty without waiting for approval from the Republic's cabinet, some of whose members were among the envoys. However, the British view was that they were not envoys, and they recognised them only as elected members of parliament representing those Irish people who wanted independence in one form or another.

By September, the British called for a conference with the envoys "to ascertain how the association of Ireland with the community of nations known as the British Empire can best be reconciled with Irish national aspirations". De Valera replied on 12 September "Our nation has formally declared its independence and recognises itself as a sovereign State." The same invitation was repeated and negotiations started on 11 October.

== Anglo-Irish Treaty ==
Each side in the 1921 negotiations used sufficiently elastic language to enable the Republic's delegates to suggest that what was taking place was inter-state negotiations, while allowing the British Government to suggest that it was an internal United Kingdom of Great Britain and Ireland matter. The Anglo-Irish Treaty, when signed on 6 December, was similarly put through three processes to satisfy both sides. It was:

- passed by Dáil Éireann, to satisfy the belief in the Republic's supporters that it was a state and its parliament was sovereign;
- passed by the United Kingdom, to satisfy British constitutional theory that a treaty had been negotiated between His Majesty's Government and His Majesty's subjects in Ireland;
- passed by the House of Commons of Southern Ireland, to reflect the belief in British constitutional law that Ireland already possessed a home rule parliament. In reality the House of Commons had the same membership (bar four) as the Dáil, though anti-Treaty members of the House stayed away.

Finally, the two structures of government (the British government's administration in Dublin Castle and the Republic's) began a process of convergence, to cover the year until the coming into force of the new Irish Free State.

== Dissolution ==
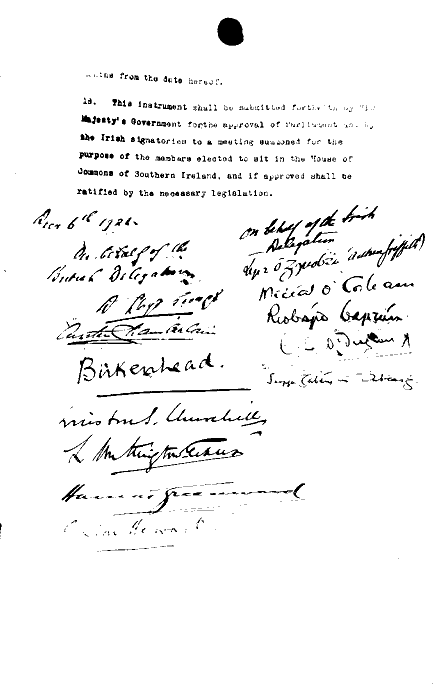
Signatures on the Anglo-Irish Treaty

By approving the Anglo-Irish Treaty on 7 January 1922 and the Constitution of the Irish Free State in October 1922 the Dáil agreed to the replacement of the Republic with the system of constitutional monarchy of the Irish Free State.

In January 1922, a Provisional Government came into being, but the Irish Republic was not dismantled; its institutions continued to operate in parallel with those of the provisional authority. Michael Collins was designated as Chairman of the Provisional Government, in theory answerable to the House of Commons of Southern Ireland and appointed by the Lord Lieutenant. In contrast, the Republic's Ministry continued with Arthur Griffith as President of the Republic following de Valera's resignation. However the two administrations were progressively merged until in August, following the deaths of both Griffith and Collins, W. T. Cosgrave assumed both leadership positions simultaneously and so the two most important offices effectively became one, producing a unique constitutional hybrid; a crown-appointed prime minister and a president of a republic. Both parliaments, the Second Dáil and the House of Commons, were replaced by a joint parliament known variously as the Third Dáil or the Provisional Parliament, elected on 16 June 1922. As a constituent assembly this enacted a new constitution with the passage of the Irish Free State Constitution Act.

On 6 December 1922, the Constitution of the Irish Free State came into effect and the institutions of both the Irish Republic and the Provisional Government ceased to exist.

== Legacy ==
The goal of those who established the Irish Republic was to create an independent republic comprising the whole island of Ireland. They failed in this goal, but the Irish Republic paved the way for the creation of the Irish Free State, a Commonwealth dominion with self-government. By 1937, under a new constitution, the Free State became a fully independent republic with the self-designation 'Ireland'. The principle of an all-island Republic remains a central aspiration of at least three of the main political parties in the Republic of Ireland (Fianna Fáil, Fine Gael and Sinn Féin) and of two of the main political parties in Northern Ireland (Sinn Féin and the SDLP).

== Irish Republic in the post-Treaty Republican tradition ==
Since the Civil War during 1922 and 1923, the Irish Republic has been an important symbol for radical republicans, amongst others. The Civil War began in June 1922 when both Sinn Féin and the IRA split between those pragmatists, who supported the Treaty, and the hardline republicans who opposed the compromises it contained. In particular the anti-Treaty faction objected to the continued role in the Irish constitution that would be granted to the British monarch under the Irish Free State. When the Dáil ratified the Treaty its opponents mostly walked out, arguing that the Dáil was attempting to 'destroy' the Irish Republic, and that its members had no right to do so. After the Irish electorate voted in a majority of pro-Treaty candidates to the Dáil, Éamon de Valera declared that "the people have no right to do wrong."

Opponents of the Treaty refused to recognise either the Provisional Government or, when it was established, the Irish Free State, insisting that the Irish Republic continued to exist as a de jure entity. Their line of authority included some TDs but also the Army Executive of the IRA which decided in early 1922 that it, and no longer the Dáil, was the only body loyal to the republic. In August 1920 it had sworn allegiance to both the Dáil and the republic, and felt that the Dáil had broken its oath when it voted to approve the Treaty. Arguments about abandoning the republic had, however, been very fully discussed during the Treaty Debates.

The anti-treaty faction also refused to recognise the Third Dáil elected in June 1922, as the Second Dáil had not met to dissolve itself formally (though the "declaration of election" on 19 May, which gave dates for nominations and the election, was not opposed at the time). Anti-Treaty Republicans considered the Third Dáil, and all future institutions arising from it, as illegal, even though some had been elected to sit in it.

The anti-Treaty side was then defeated in the Civil War. Most militant opposition to the Free State came to an end on 24 May 1923 when Frank Aiken, chief-of-staff of the IRA, issued the order to "dump arms", and Éamon de Valera issued his address to the "Legion of the Rearguard". Éamon de Valera continued as president Sinn Féin. In March 1926, de Valera, along with most anti-Treaty politicians, founded a new party called Fianna Fáil and ended their boycott of the institutions of the Free State.

Nonetheless, a hard-line minority continued to reject the legitimacy of the Free State and its successor, the Republic of Ireland. In 1938, a group calling itself the Executive Council of the Second Dáil delegated its self-declared authority to the IRA Army Council. The Irish Republican Army ultimately ceased military operations against Ireland in 1948, but continued to consider itself the legitimate government of Ireland. The Provisional Irish Republican Army (PIRA) split with the original IRA in December 1969 and afterward claimed that it was the sole legitimate representative of the Irish Republic. It based its claim, in part, on the support of Second Dáil member Tom Maguire. The PIRA conducted a campaign of bombings and shootings in Northern Ireland from the late 1960s until 1998, and its political wing, the modern Sinn Féin party, used to insist that the Irish Republic was still legally in existence, with the Provisional IRA as its national army, and the IRA Army Council Ireland's sole legitimate government. This view is still upheld by Republican Sinn Féin and the Continuity IRA. Until their disbandment, the Provisional IRA continued to use the title Óglaigh na hÉireann (lit. Volunteers of Ireland), the official Irish title for the Irish Defence Forces. Continuity IRA based their claims in part on the support they received from the last surviving anti-treaty Second Dáil member, Tom Maguire.

== See also ==
- History of Ireland (1801–1923)
- History of the Republic of Ireland
- Names of the Irish state
- List of historical unrecognized states and dependencies
