= Dáil Constitution =

The Constitution of Dáil Éireann (Irish: Bunreacht Dála Éireann), more commonly known as the Dáil Constitution, was the constitution of the 1919–22 Irish Republic. It was adopted by the First Dáil at its first meeting on 21 January 1919 and remained in operation until 6 December 1922. As adopted it consisted of five articles. Article 1 declared that the Dáil had "full powers to legislate" and would consist of representatives elected in elections conducted by the British government. For the exercise of executive power it created a cabinet, answerable to the Dáil, called the Ministry (Irish: Aireacht), headed by a prime minister called the "Príomh Aire" (in practice also known as the President of Dáil Éireann). The constitution was limited to an outline of the functions of the legislature and the executive; the Dáil later established a system of Dáil Courts, but there was no provision in the constitution on a judiciary. The final article of the constitution declared that it was intended to be a provisional document, in the sense that it was subject to amendment. As adopted the constitution came to only around 370 words. In comparison, the modern Constitution of Ireland has approximately 16,000 words. Overall, the structure of the document was as follows:

- Article 1: Dáil Éireann
- Article 2: Ministry of Dáil Éireann
- Article 3: Chairman of the Dáil
- Article 4: Finance
- Article 5: Amendments

== Amendments ==
- 1 April 1919: Five amendments were made to the constitution on this day:
  - Allowed for the nomination of the members of the Ministry at the same meeting as the election of the President.
  - Allowed for the nomination in writing by the President of a President-Substitute in periods of temporary absences.
  - Allowed for the appointment of a Minister-Substitute in periods of temporary absences.
  - Increased the maximum number of ministers from four to "a President of the Ministry elected by Dáil Eireann, and not more than nine Executive Officers".
  - provided that twice yearly auditing of accounts would not begin until November 1919.
- 25 August 1921: The style of the head of the ministry was amended to "the President who shall also be Prime Minister", and reduced the cabinet to six members. The amendment also made further changes to the dates mentioned in Article 4. This made more explicit the idea that the head of the ministry was both head of state and head of government.

Following the change to the Constitution in 1921, Éamon de Valera was proposed and elected as President of the Irish Republic, rather than President of Dáil Éireann.

== Operation after the Treaty ==
After the ratification of the Anglo-Irish Treaty by the Dáil on 7 January 1922, de Valera left office in 1922. Those elected to the position of president were styled again as President of Dáil Éireann: Arthur Griffith on 10 January 1922 and W. T. Cosgrave on 9 September 1922.

In order to implement the Treaty the Parliament of the United Kingdom adopted the Irish Free State (Agreement) Act 1922. This provided for an executive, called the Provisional Government, and a "house of parliament" to which it would be accountable. The institutions established by the Dáil Constitution operated in parallel with these structures recognised by the British government. However, in practice the two systems of government were eventually merged. When the "house of parliament" was convened in 1922 on 9 September it was treated by those in attendance as the 3rd Dáil, and those appointed as president and Ministry of Dáil Éireann were the same cabinet serving as the Provisional Government.

The Dáil Constitution finally became defunct when the new Constitution of the Irish Free State came into force on 6 December 1922.

== Commentary ==
The constitution's close modelling of its institutional system on the Westminster system of government, specifically with the inclusion of a parliament from whom a ministry was both chosen and to whom it was answerable, has been noted by Irish political scientists and historians, notably Professor Brian Farrell, who suggested that the leaders of the new state stuck to a system that, through Irish participation in the United Kingdom of Great Britain and Ireland, the new Irish political elite had close experience of, and identification with, notwithstanding their radical republican rhetoric.
