= Democratic Programme =

Irish political document

The Democratic Programme was a declaration of social, economic, and political principles adopted on 21 January 1919 by the First Dáil (Dáil Éireann), the revolutionary parliament established by Irish nationalist politicians who had won a sweeping electoral victory in the general election of December 1918. Rather than take their seats at Westminster, these representatives convened in Dublin and declared an independent Irish Republic. The Programme was one of four constitutional documents adopted at that inaugural public sitting, alongside the Constitution of Dáil Éireann, the Declaration of Independence, and the Message to the Free Nations of the World. It outlined a vision of social governance for the new Republic, addressing the rights of citizens, the welfare of children, the development of natural resources, and the relationship between private property and the common good.

== Background ==
The First Dáil emerged from Sinn Féin's sweeping victory in the British general election of December 1918, held under the terms of the Representation of the People Act 1918. The Act significantly expanded the electorate, granting the vote to women over 30 meeting a property qualification and to all men over 21, increasing the Irish electorate from approximately 700,000 to around two million. Sinn Féin won 73 seats, representing 46.9 per cent of the Irish vote, effectively annihilating the Irish Parliamentary Party, which had dominated constitutional nationalism for decades.

In line with its manifesto, Sinn Féin invited all elected Irish representatives to the first meeting of the Dáil. Unionists and surviving Irish Parliamentary Party members declined to attend. Of the 69 Sinn Féin TDs elected, many were imprisoned or absent. Only 27 were present at the inaugural session.

Prior to the election, the leadership of the Labour Party entered into discussions with Sinn Féin and ultimately decided not to field any candidates. The publicly stated justification was that the election should serve as a national plebiscite on independence. Historian Emmet O'Connor has argued, however, that the abstention was not the result of any directive from Sinn Féin, and that Labour stood down for its own reasons, primarily to avoid dividing the vote for self-determination and to preserve its standing within the international labour movement. O'Connor contends there was no electoral "debt of honour" owed to Labour, as is sometimes assumed, and that neither of the two principal first-hand accounts of the Programme's formulation (those of Cathal O'Shannon and Seán T. O'Kelly) reference the election as a motivation.

A primary purpose of the Democratic Programme was to support the Irish delegation at the International Socialist Conference, held in Berne, Switzerland, in February 1919. The Irish Labour Party had sought to establish a presence within the international socialist movement since at least 1917, when the Socialist Party of Ireland was revived. The end of the First World War created expectations that a revived socialist International would influence the post-war peace settlement, and Labour was eager to present Ireland's case for self-determination in that forum.

According to O'Shannon, it was O'Kelly who approached William O'Brien of the Irish Transport and General Workers' Union with the proposal that an agreed Labour social programme be endorsed by the Dáil, so that it could serve as a mandate for the Labour delegation at Berne. The document was therefore designed, in the first instance, to advance the Irish cause at an international socialist conference rather than to serve as a domestic legislative programme.

== Drafting ==
=== Authors ===
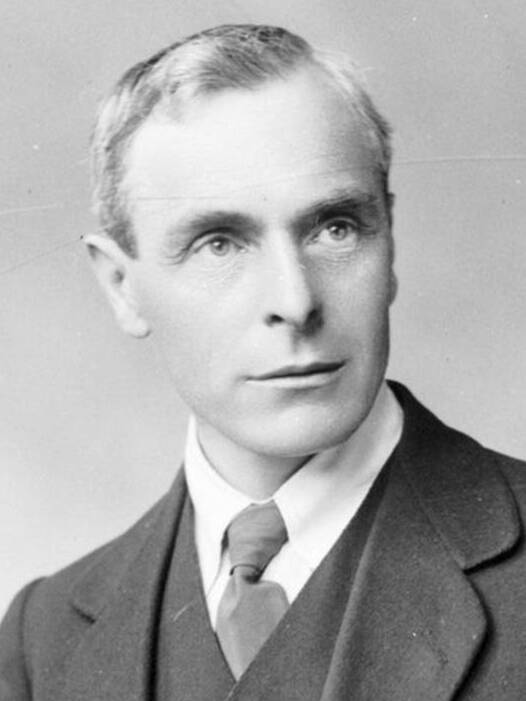
Thomas Johnson

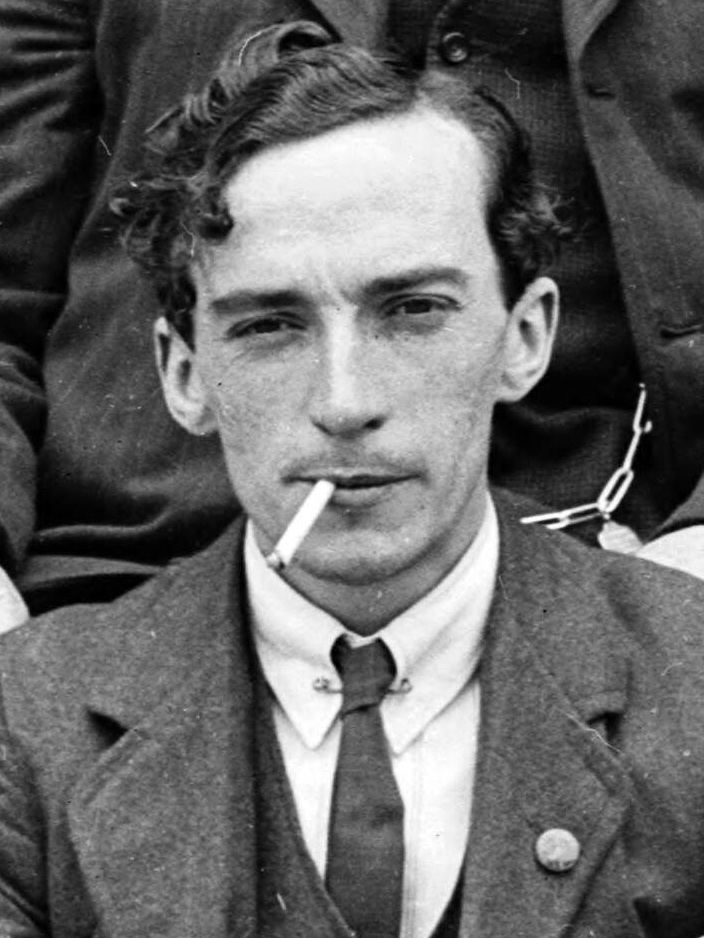
Cathal O'Shannon

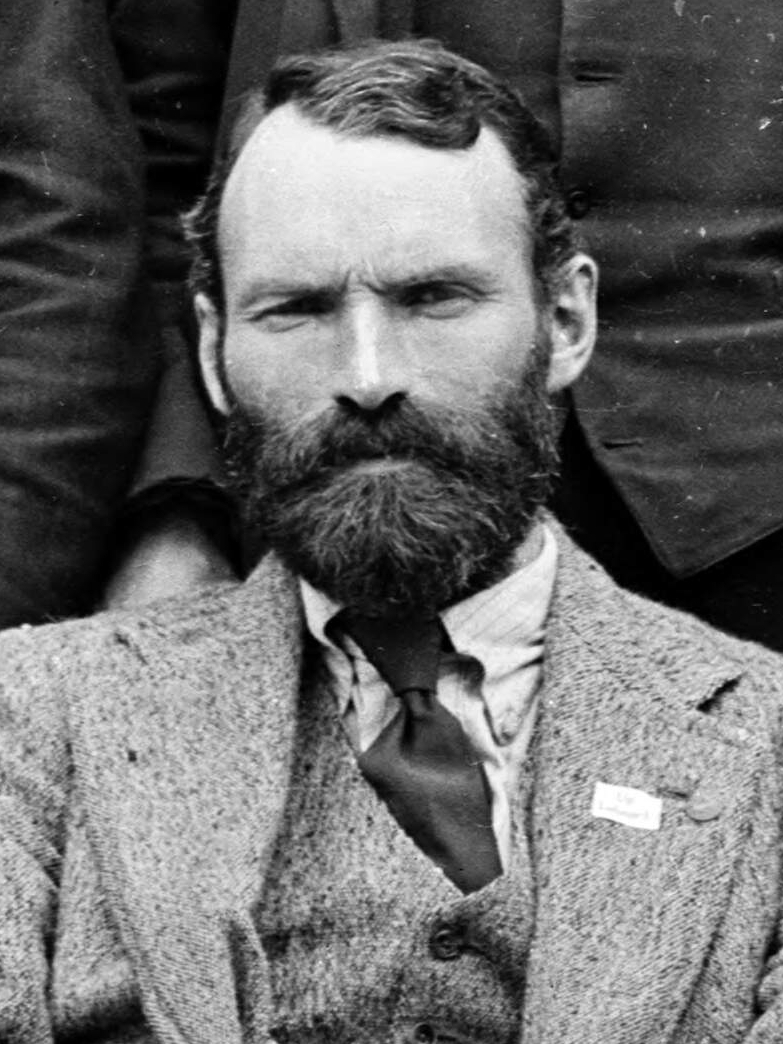
William O'Brien

The Democratic Programme had several principal contributors. Thomas Johnson produced the principal draft, with input from William O'Brien and Cathal O'Shannon. O'Shannon contributed the opening section using Pádraig Pearse's writings. Seán T. O'Kelly revised and substantially redrafted the document on the night of 20 January 1919, retaining much of Johnson's text while removing its most overtly socialist passages and adding his own section on the Poor Law.

=== Tom Johnson's original draft ===
Thomas Johnson, secretary of the Labour Party, produced the initial draft of the Democratic Programme, with contributions from William O'Brien and Cathal O'Shannon. O'Shannon wrote the opening section, drawing on the writings of Pádraig Pearse, specifically his 1916 pamphlet The Sovereign People, in which Pearse argued that no private right to property was valid against the public right of the nation. Johnson's draft was explicitly socialist in character. It characterised the holding of property in terms of trusteeship rather than absolute ownership, asserted the state's right to resume possession of property without compensation if the trust were abused, called for the organisation of the people into trade unions and co-operative societies with a view to workers' control of industry, and included a concluding declaration that the Republic would aim at "the elimination of the class in society which lives upon the wealth produced by the workers of the nation but gives no useful service in return".

=== Revision by Seán O'Kelly ===
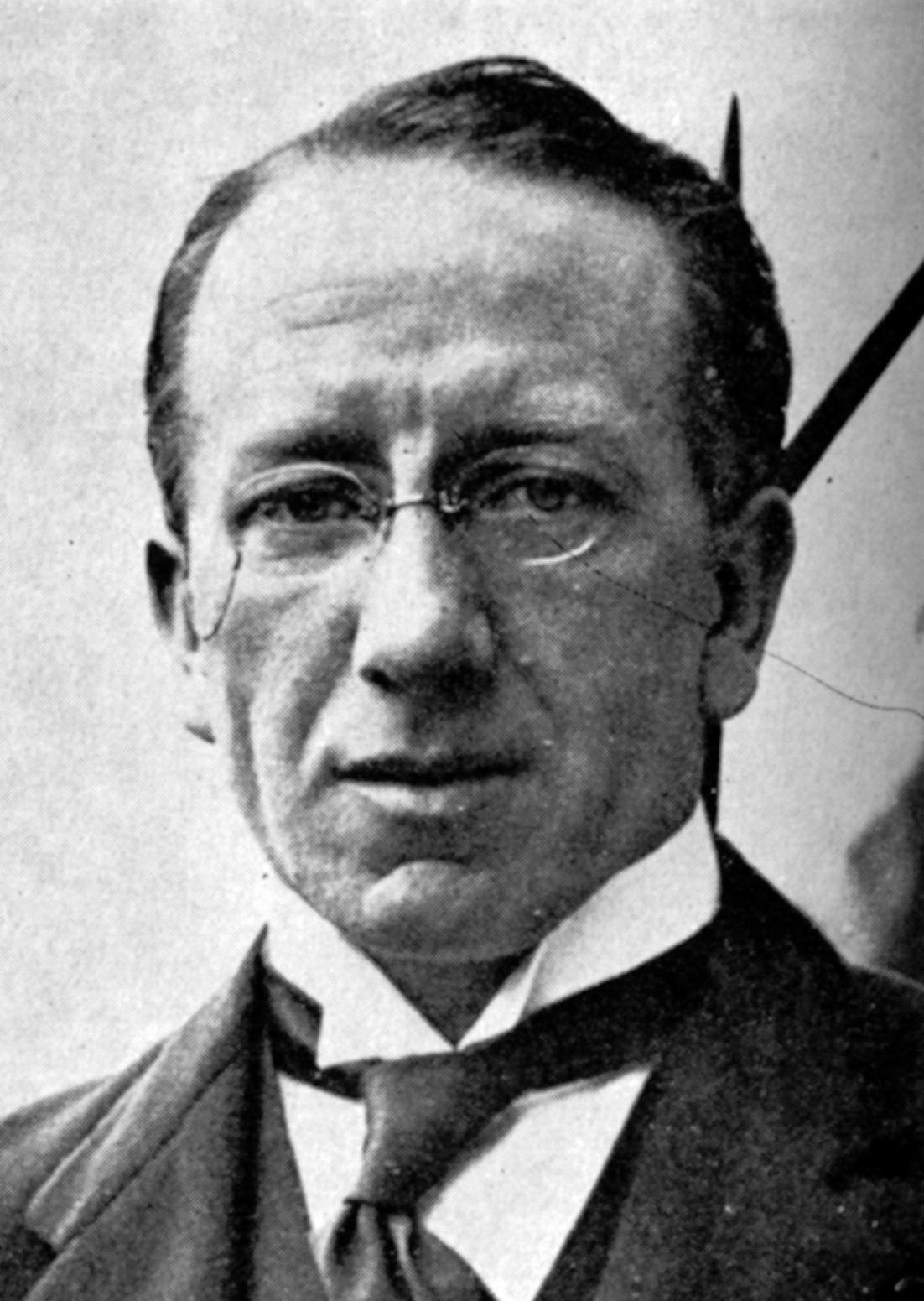
Seán T. O'Kelly

Johnson's draft provoked serious objections within Sinn Féin. According to historian P. S. O'Hegarty, a meeting of Irish Republican Brotherhood members on the morning of 20 January 1919 considered the draft. The majority view was that social and economic questions of this kind should be deferred until after independence had been achieved. Michael Collins reportedly promised that the document would be "suppressed", but others insisted on its retention. O'Kelly, who had initiated the process of securing a Labour document for the Dáil, undertook to redraft the text overnight. O'Kelly worked through the night of 20 January, assisted by his wife, completing the revised text after 4 a.m. He then had it typed for distribution before the Dáil meeting that afternoon. The revised document was not submitted to any committee prior to the sitting.

Writing in Seanad Éireann in November 1943, O'Kelly claimed authorship of the Democratic Programme, saying he had gathered "a variety of notes" from Johnson, O'Brien, and others, but that he himself had produced the final text. O'Shannon challenged this account in a series of articles in the Irish Times in January and February 1944, in which he published Johnson's original draft and argued that two-thirds of the final text derived from Johnson's work, with only around one-third attributable to O'Kelly. O'Kelly subsequently acknowledged that O'Shannon's account gave a "more complete" version of events.

=== Differences between drafts ===
Comparing the two drafts, O'Connor has argued that the changes were less stark than they appeared. Some revisions were purely textual. Others were more substantive. Pearse's formulation that "no private right in property is good as against the public right of the nation" was softened to read that "all right to private property must be subordinated to the public right and welfare", though the essential meaning is similar. O'Kelly removed the paragraph encouraging the organisation of trade unions and co-operatives and deleted entirely the concluding paragraph on the elimination of a class living off the labour of others. He added an original paragraph calling for the abolition of the Poor Law system, which reflected long-standing nationalist and Sinn Féin policy, and which contained the only positive commitment in either draft. The reference to the state resumption of property without compensation was also removed.

== Adoption ==
The Dáil assembled at 3.30 p.m. on 21 January 1919. The Democratic Programme was the last of the four constitutional documents to be adopted. As no Irish-language translation had been prepared in time, Piaras Béaslaí delivered an improvised translation directly from the English text, pretending to read from an Irish version. The English text was then read by Thomas Kelly. Richard Mulcahy proposed its adoption, speaking entirely in Irish, and Con Collins of West Limerick seconded it. The Programme was adopted without a division.

Thomas Johnson and Cathal O'Shannon observed the proceedings from the public gallery. O'Shannon later recalled that Johnson was so moved by hearing his words read that he had to physically restrain him from applauding.

The Democratic Programme, as adopted, declared the right of the Irish people to ownership of Ireland and unfettered control of its destinies, drawing on the language of the 1916 Proclamation and the writings of Pearse. It affirmed that the nation's sovereignty extended to all its material possessions, including its soil, resources, and wealth-producing processes, and that all right to private property must be subordinated to the public right and welfare. The Programme declared it to be the first duty of the government to provide for the physical, mental, and spiritual well-being of children, and to ensure that no child would suffer hunger or cold from lack of food, clothing, or shelter. It committed to the abolition of the Poor Law system, to be replaced by a "sympathetic native scheme" for the care of the aged and infirm. It also set out aspirations to develop national resources, promote industrial development on co-operative lines, regulate the import and export of food and necessities in the interests of the Irish people, and to seek international co-operation on social and industrial legislation.

== Reaction and legacy ==
=== Immediate response ===
Kevin O'Higgins, a government minister in the early years of the Irish Free State and one of the 27 TDs present at the Mansion House, subsequently dismissed the Programme as "largely poetry", and suggested its contents "looked very much like Communist doctrine". Piaras Béaslaí later acknowledged that many of those present would not have voted for it without amendment had there been any immediate prospect of putting it into force. The Irish Times editorial on the day of the Dáil meeting expressed concern about what it characterised as potential Bolshevism. The Freeman's Journal shared similar anxieties. At the International Socialist Conference in Berne in February 1919, Johnson and O'Shannon used the Programme as part of their case for Irish self-determination, distributing it widely among delegates. The conference passed two resolutions endorsing Ireland's right to self-determination and calling for peace talks, and the Irish representatives succeeded in persuading the British Labour delegation to adopt self-determination, rather than Home Rule within the empire, as its policy on Ireland.

=== Implementation ===
The Democratic Programme was not used as a basis for legislation by the First Dáil. When Deputy Tom Kelly asked Eamon de Valera in April 1919 about the implementation of the social commitments in the Programme, de Valera replied that it had "contemplated a situation somewhat different from that in which they actually found themselves", and that while the country was under occupation, the social programme could not be fully pursued. Some provisions were given effect, though O'Connor has noted there is no evidence this was directly connected to the Programme. A Dáil commission of enquiry into industrial resources was established in September 1919 and functioned until 1922. The Irish Free State joined the International Labour Organization in 1923. In 1925, the workhouse system was abolished and the boards of guardians replaced by boards of health and public assistance, partially fulfilling the Programme's commitment on the Poor Law.

The Department of Labour, one of the more active departments of the Dáil administration, was headed by Countess Markievicz as the first minister and drew on close co-operation with the trade union movement.

== Legacy and analysis ==
The Democratic Programme remained a point of reference in Irish political debate throughout the twentieth century and continues to be referenced in the 21st century. Liam Mellows, while imprisoned during the Civil War, drafted a document based on the Programme as a blueprint for a republican social policy. Fianna Fáil referenced it in its founding documents and used it as a critique of the Free State government's record. On the fiftieth anniversary of the First Dáil in 1969, Senator Owen Sheehy-Skeffington interrupted the commemorative session in the Mansion House to ask the Taoiseach Jack Lynch whether the Programme was likely ever to be implemented. He received no response. That same day, vice-president of Sinn Féin Joe Clarke also interrupted proceedings to demand the Democratic Programme be implemented.

In 1970, in an article entitled What Is Irish Republicanism? (published in the Irish Independent), the leader of Provisional Sinn Féin Ruairí Ó Brádaigh cited the Democratic Programme as a key objective of Irish Republicanism, beyond simply controlling all 32 counties of Ireland.

Ahead of the 2007 Irish general election, Vincent Browne argued in a 2006 Magill article that the Labour Party had drifted from its earlier socialist ethos and could benefit from revisiting the principles of the Democratic Programme. He noted that although Labour had helped shape the Programme, it was not represented in the First Dáil, and suggested that the document nonetheless reflected the party's original ideological commitments. Browne acknowledged that the Programme was not the product of full consensus and may have functioned partly as rhetoric, but maintained that it outlined a vision of society grounded in liberty, equality, and justice. He contrasted these ideals with contemporary political culture, which he argued no longer upheld substantive equality in areas such as healthcare, education, or economic distribution. He further highlighted the Programme's emphasis on subordinating private property to the public good and ensuring social welfare, particularly for children, suggesting that these principles had not been realised in modern policymaking.

Historian Brian Farrell argued that the Democratic Programme "did not represent the social and economic ideals of the First Dáil", observing that most members had not read it in advance and that it was redrafted in the hours before the Dáil met. He characterised it as "another political manoeuvre designed to win support" rather than a genuine statement of Sinn Féin's social aspirations, and described it as "the social revolution that never was" (a phrase originally coined by Patrick Lynch).

Historian Emmet O'Connor has argued that the Programme was "neither democratic" (in the sense of having a popular mandate) nor "a programme" (in the sense of being written for implementation), and that it is very likely Labour did not draft it with implementation in mind. He notes that Johnson's draft included no firm demands and that Labour subsequently put no pressure on Dáil Éireann to give effect to its provisions.
