= Revolutionary republic =

Representative democracy established immediately after overthrow

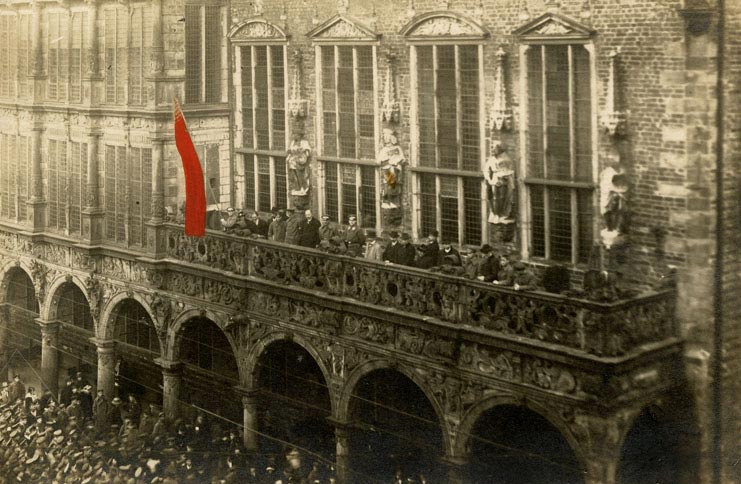
Proclamation of the Bremen Soviet Republic

A revolutionary republic is a form of government whose main tenets are popular sovereignty, rule of law, and representative democracy. It is based in part on the ideas of Enlightenment thinkers, and was favored by revolutionaries during the Age of Revolution. A revolutionary republic tends to arise from the formation of a provisional government after the overthrow of an existing state and political regime. It often takes the form of a revolutionary state, which ostensibly represents the will of its constituents.

The term also refers to the form of government that the National Convention favored during the French Revolutionary Wars, as France established republics through its occupation of neighboring territories in Europe. Most of these client states, or sister republics, were means of controlling occupied lands through a mix of French and local authority. The institution of republican governments as a means of promoting democratic nationalism over monarchies (primarily the Bourbons and Habsburgs) set the stage for the appearance of nationalist sentiment across Europe, which significantly influenced the course of European history (see 1830 and Revolutions of 1848).

"Revolutionary republic" can refer to various governments in disparate locations. In the United Kingdom, it can be defined as those who advocate for the removal of the monarch as head of state, or for the replacement of the monarch with an elected figurehead, as in Irish nationalism, the self-declared Irish Republic of 1919–1922 is described as a revolutionary republic. In Australia, revolutionary republicanism is closely tied to moderate nationalism, along with opposition to monarchy.

== Revolutionary American Republic ==
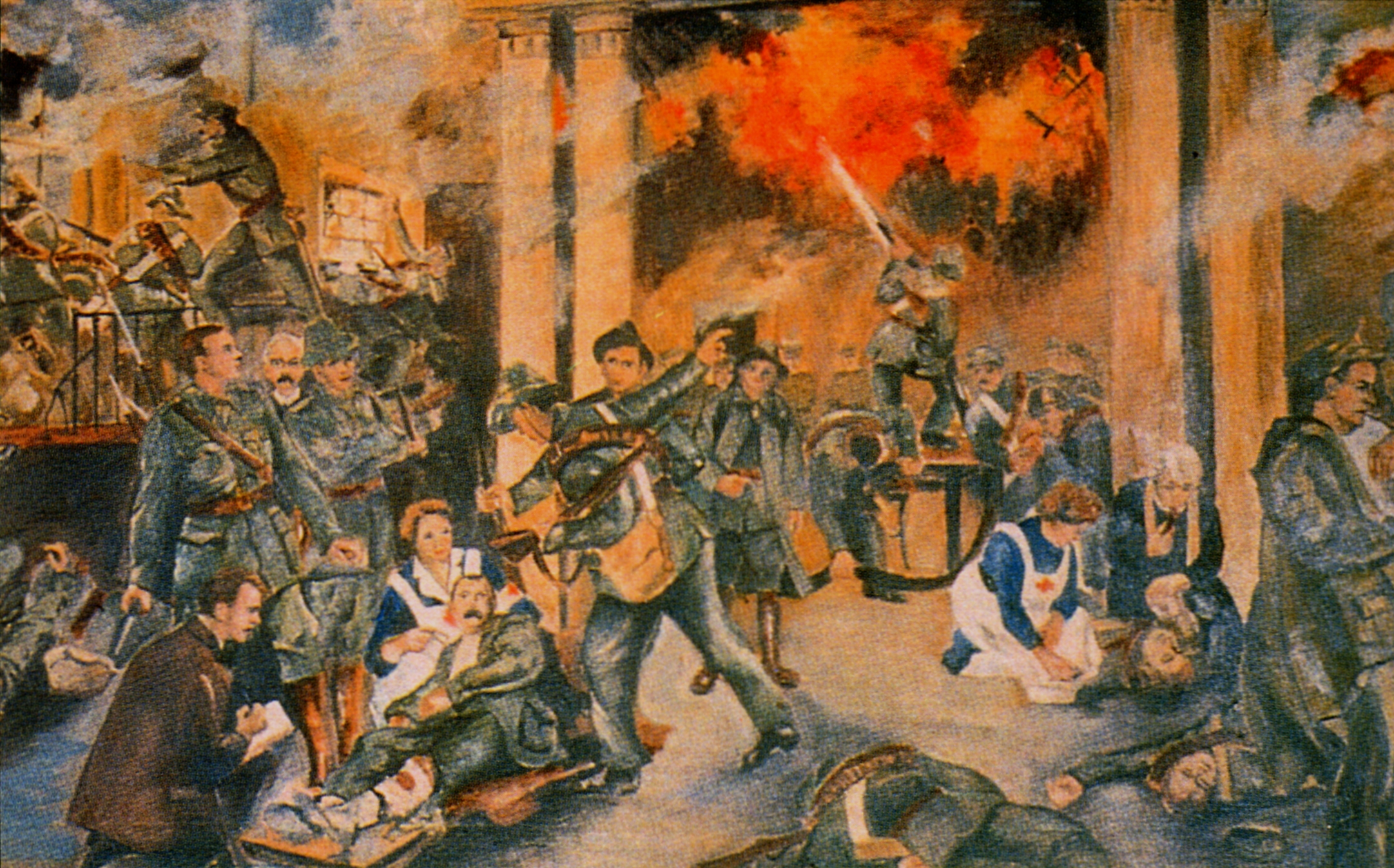
The Easter Rising, a major event of Irish republicanism

Leading up to and during the American Revolution in the 1760s and 1770s, intellectual and political leaders in the Thirteen Colonies closely read history to compare forms of governments and their effectiveness. They were especially concerned with the history of liberty in England and with the rights of Englishmen, which they claimed were the proper heritage of the colonists. These intellectuals were especially influenced by Britain's Country Party (which opposed the ruling Court Party). The Country Party relied heavily on the classical republicanism of Roman heritage; it celebrated the ideals of duty and virtuous citizenship. It drew heavily on ancient Greek city-state (polis) and Roman republican examples. The Country Party denounced the corruption surrounding the Court Party in London, centering on the royal court. The resulting political ideology was widespread in America by 1775. Robert Kelley called republicanism "the distinctive political consciousness of the entire Revolutionary generation". J. G. A. Pocock explained the intellectual sources in America:

The Whig canon and the neo-Harringtonians, John Milton, James Harrington and Sidney, Trenchard, Gordon and Bolingbroke, together with the Greek, Roman, and Renaissance masters of the tradition as far as Montesquieu, formed the authoritative literature of this culture; and its values and concepts were those with which we have grown familiar: a civic and patriot ideal in which the personality was founded in property, perfected in citizenship but perpetually threatened by corruption; government figuring paradoxically as the principal source of corruption and operating through such means as patronage, faction, standing armies (opposed to the ideal of the militia); established churches (opposed to the Puritan and deist modes of American religion); and the promotion of a monied interest—though the formulation of this last concept was somewhat hindered by the keen desire for readily available paper credit common in colonies of settlement.

American revolutionaries took a lesson from Ancient Rome. They were determined to avoid the luxurious lifestyles and greed that had destroyed the Roman Empire. A virtuous citizen was defined as one who ignored monetary compensation and made a commitment to resist and eradicate corruption. Republicanism required the service of those who were willing to give up their own interests for a common good. According to Bernard Bailyn, "The preservation of liberty rested on the ability of the people to maintain effective checks on wielders of power and hence in the last analysis rested on the vigilance and moral stamina of the people." The duty of the virtuous citizen became a foundation for the ideology of the American Revolution.

== Sources ==
- Akşin, Sina (2007). Turkey from empire to revolutionary republic: the emergence of the Turkish nation from 1789 to the present. New York University Press. ISBN 978-0-8147-0722-7.
- Galluzzo, Anthony (2008). Revolutionary Republic of Letters: Anglo-American Radical Literature in the 1790s. ISBN 978-0-549-84077-0.
- Mirkin, Harris (1967). The Revolutionary Republic: The Right of Revolution and the American Constitutional System. Princeton University.
- Parsi, Rouzbeh (2012). Iran: a Revolutionary Republic in Transition. Institute for Security Studies. ISBN 978-92-9198-198-4.
- Shankman, Andrew (16 April 2014). The World of the Revolutionary American Republic: Land, Labor, and the Conflict for a Continent. Routledge. ISBN 978-1-317-81497-9.
