= Mansion House, Dublin =

Mansion House
- Teach an Ard-Mhéara
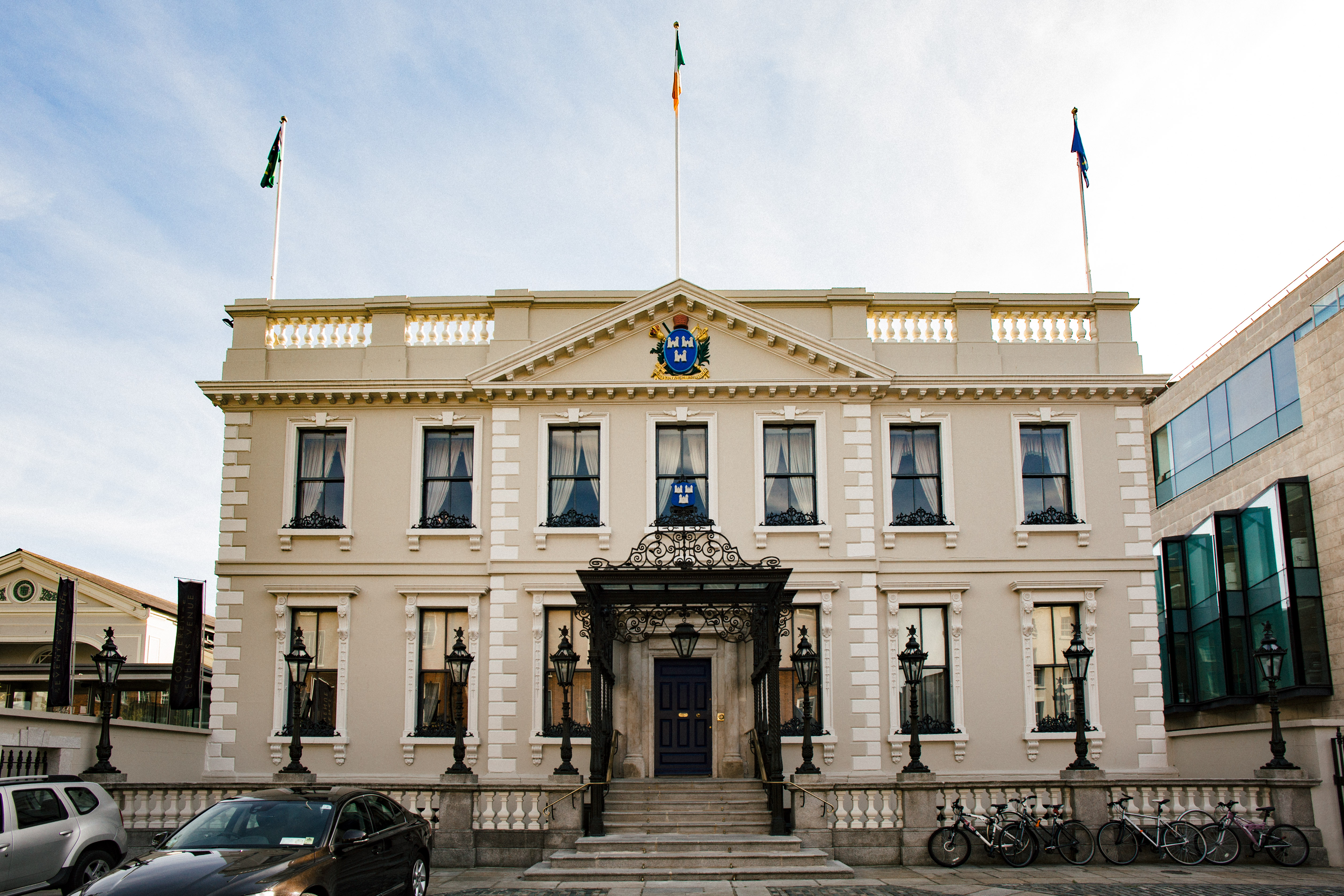
- Mansion House in 2015

- Location within Central Dublin

General information
- Type: Official residence of the Lord Mayor of Dublin
- Architectural style: Queen Anne style (original house)
- Location: Dawson Street, Dublin 2, D02 AF30
- Coordinates: 53°20′25″N 06°15′28″W
- Completed: 1710
- Inaugurated: 1715
- Owner: Dublin City Council

The Mansion House (Irish: Teach an Ard-Mhéara) is a house on Dawson Street, Dublin, which has been the official residence of the Lord Mayor of Dublin since 1715, and was also the meeting place of the Dáil Éireann from 1919 until 1922.

== History ==
The first dedicated mayoralty house was built in 1665 by Sir Daniel Bellingham, 1st Baronet at the corner of Castle Street and Fishamble Street.

The modern Mansion House was later commissioned by the merchant and property developer Joshua Dawson. The site he selected was a piece of poor-quality marshy land outside the medieval city walls which he acquired in 1705. The building was designed in the Queen Anne style, built in brick with a stucco finish and was completed in 1710. The design involved a symmetrical main frontage of seven bays facing onto Dawson Street. The central section of three bays, which was projected forward, featured an opening formed by a pair of Ionic order columns supporting an entablature. The other bays on the ground floor and all the bays on the first floor were fenestrated with sash windows with stone surrounds and window sills. At roof level, there was a balustraded parapet with a modillioned pediment above the central section.

Dublin Corporation purchased the house in 1715 for assignment as the official residence of the Lord Mayor. In 1821, the Round Room was built in order to receive King George IV, while the stained glass window on the staircase was made by Joshua Clarke and Sons for the visit of Queen Victoria in 1900.

The First Dáil assembled in the Round Room on 21 January 1919 to proclaim the Irish Declaration of Independence. Two years later, in 1921, the Anglo-Irish Treaty was ratified in the same location.

In the 1930s, plans were made to demolish the building, and all other buildings on the block on which it is located (which covered an area on Dawson Street, Molesworth Street, Kildare Street and the north side of St Stephen's Green), to enable the building of a new City Hall. However the decision of the Government to erect a new Department of Industry and Commerce on a site on the same block, on Kildare Street, led to the abandonment of the plans.

On 21 January 1969, a special fiftieth-anniversary joint session of Dáil Éireann and Seanad Éireann assembled in the Round Room and was addressed by the President of Ireland, Éamon de Valera.

In August 2006, the loyalist paramilitary Ulster Volunteer Force claimed they had planted a bomb in the Mansion House in 1981, in an attempt to wipe out the Sinn Féin leadership at their party conference of that year. The claim led to a security alert at the house, as the Garda Síochána and army searched for a 25-year-old bomb, but none was found.

On 21 January 2019, the one-hundredth anniversary of the First Dáil, another special joint session of Dáil Éireann and Seanad Éireann was held in the Round Room and was again addressed by the Irish President. This time, the President was Michael D. Higgins.

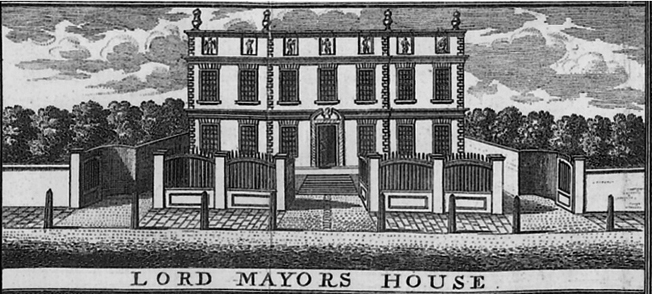
Lord Mayors House, Dublin taken from Charles Brooking's map of Dublin (1728)

== Occupants ==
Its most famous occupants included Lord Mayors:

- Daniel O'Connell, nineteenth-century nationalist leader
- Alfie Byrne (1930s), longest serving Lord Mayor in the 800-year history of the office
- Jim Mitchell (1976–77), the youngest Lord Mayor of Dublin, aged 29, in the history of the office
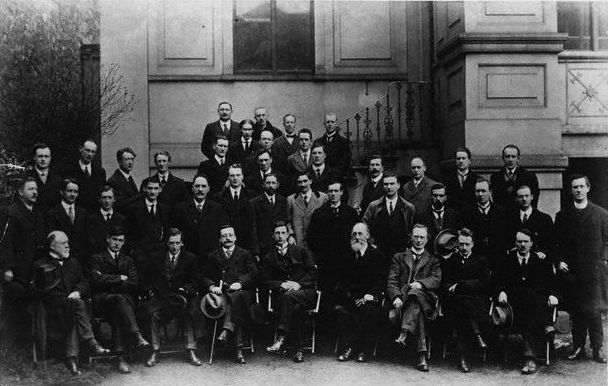
First Dáil Éireann at the Mansion House 21 January 1919.

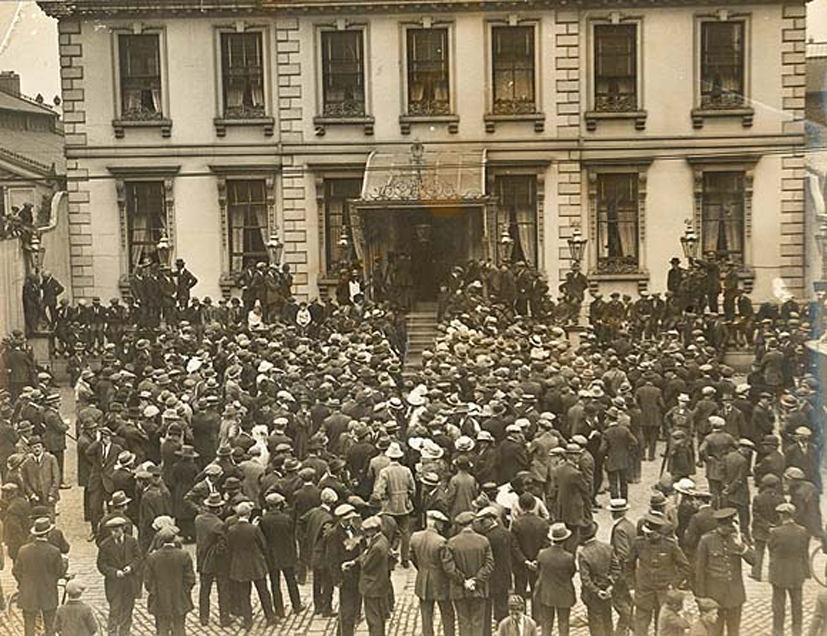
Crowd outside Mansion House ahead of War of Independence truce 8 July 1921

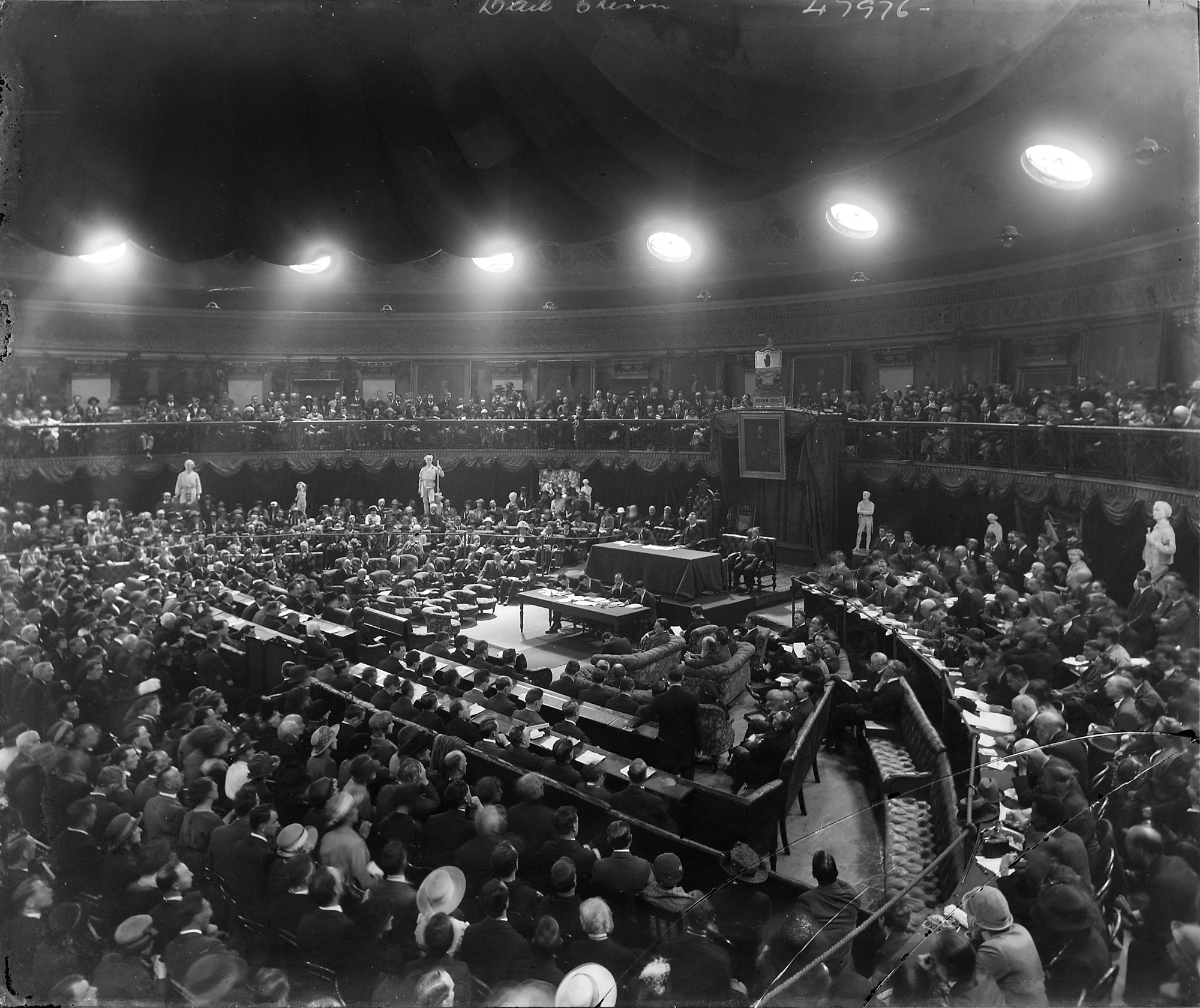
First sitting of Second Dáil in the Mansion House, 17 August 1921 (flopped image). In the un-flopped version of the photograph, sitting from left to right beside the Speaker's Chair are the Lord Mayor of Dublin, Seán T. O'Kelly, Éamon de Valera, Diarmuid O'Hegarty and F. P. Walsh, and sitting in front of the Speaker's Chair from left to right are Michael Collins and Richard Mulcahy.
