= Frank Thornton (Irish republican) =

Irish republican (1891–1965)

Frank Thornton (1891–1965) was an Irish republican active in the Irish revolutionary period.

He was born in Drogheda the eldest of eight children. The family emigrated to Liverpool where he joined the Gaelic League, the Irish Republican Brotherhood and the Irish Volunteers. During the Easter Rising, he initially commanded at Liberty Hall before taking charge of the Imperial Hotel on O’Connell Street. He sustained two wounds.

After the surrender, he was sentenced to death under the mistaken name of "Frank Drennan". The sentence was later commuted to ten years. He was imprisoned in Dartmoor and Portland and was released under the 1917 general amnesty. Frank Thornton died on holiday in Sitges, Spain on 22 September 1965.

== Irish War of Independence (1919-1921) ==
From 1919, Thornton joined the Michael Collins' intelligence operations and played a key role in organising IRA activities across Armagh, Louth, Monaghan, Cavan, Longford and Down. Based at 3 Crow Street, Dublin, the IRA Intelligence Staff included of the Director of Intelligence Michael Collins, the Deputy Director of Intelligence Liam Tobin, 2nd Deputy Director of Intelligence Tom Cullen, and Third Deputy Director of Intelligence Thornton.

Probably the most high-profile death of the Irish War of Independence in County Wexford was Royal Irish Constabulary (RIC) District Inspector Percival Lee-Wilson, which features in the movie Michael Collins. He was shot dead outside his Gorey home on 15 June 1920. At the end of the Easter Rising, Collins had allegedly seen Lee-Wilson (then stationed at Dublin) mistreating prisoners. There were six I.R.A. men involved in the shooting included Thornton and Tobin, both of whom travelled from Dublin.

On Bloody Sunday (1920), the Cairo Gang Assassinations were enacted. The killings were planned to coincide with a Gaelic football match between Dublin and Tipperary, because the large crowds around Dublin would allow the members of Collins' Squad to move about more easily, and make it more difficult for the British to detect them before and after the attack. Through 2nd Lt J.C. Reynolds of F Company Auxiliary Division, Collins was provided with information on the Auxiliaries responsible for the killing of Peadar Clancy, Dick McKee and Conor Clune. Frank Thornton, as one of Collins intelligence staff, was to receive information and photographs of the "murder gang", not only of F Company but of Q Company and a number of others also.

== Irish Civil War (1922-23) ==
Frank Thornton supported the December 1921 Anglo-Irish Treaty. He was appointed a colonel commandant in the National Army the following year while taking charge at the Criminal Investigation Department at Oriel House, Westland Row.

On 22 August 1922 Two Free State soldiers were killed and three wounded in an ambush at Redmondstown, County Kilkenny on the road between Clonmel and Kilkenny. Free State commandant Thornton was badly wounded in the incident. Three other Free State officers had been captured by the irregulars in the same spot the previous night.

== Army Mutiny ==
On 7 March 1924, a representative of the Irish Republican Army Organisation (IRAO) handed a demand to end demobilisation to W. T. Cosgrave. The ultimatum was signed by senior army officers, Major-General Liam Tobin and Colonel Charles Dalton. Thornton and Cullen were also involved. He resigned after the army mutiny.

== Later life ==
New Ireland Assurance was founded as the New Ireland Assurance Collecting Society in January 1918. by amongst others, Thornton while he was still in prison. Thornton became assistant manager in 1924, manager in 1954, and general manager in 1959

During the Emergency (1939–45), Thornton re-enlisted in the Army, serving as a captain. He was later life president of the 2nd Battalion, Dublin Brigade, Old IRA.

When Simon Donnelly was elected in March 1940 to Córas na Poblachta as president of a central committee of fifteen members, other leaders included Frank Thornton.
