= Michael Collins (film) =

- Theatrical release poster
- Directed by: Neil Jordan
- Written by: Neil Jordan
- Produced by: Stephen Woolley
- Starring: Liam Neeson; Aidan Quinn; Stephen Rea; Alan Rickman; Julia Roberts
- Cinematography: Chris Menges
- Edited by: J. Patrick Duffner; Tony Lawson
- Music by: Elliot Goldenthal
- Production companies: The Geffen Film Company; Warner Bros.; Irish Film Board
- Distributed by: Warner Bros.
- Release dates: 28 August 1996 (Venice); 11 October 1996 (US); 8 November 1996 (Ireland)
- Running time: 132 minutes
- Country: Ireland; United States; United Kingdom
- Language: English
- Budget: $25 million
- Box office: $32.8 million

Michael Collins is a 1996 biographical film about Michael Collins, a leading figure in the early-20th-century Irish struggle for independence against the United Kingdom. It is written and directed by Neil Jordan and stars Liam Neeson in the title role, along with Aidan Quinn, Stephen Rea, Alan Rickman, and Julia Roberts. The film was distributed by Warner Bros. Pictures.

An international co-production between Ireland, the United States, and the United Kingdom, Michael Collins was one of the most expensive films ever produced in Ireland. Filming took place in Dublin, and the score was composed by Elliot Goldenthal.

Michael Collins won the Golden Lion at the 53rd Venice International Film Festival, with Neeson winning the Volpi Cup for Best Actor. It received a limited release in the United States on 11 October 1996, before going to a wide release on 25 October. It was released in Ireland on 8 November. It received generally positive reviews, and was nominated for Best Original Score and Best Cinematography at the 69th Academy Awards.

== Plot ==
At the close of the Easter Rising in 1916, the besieged Irish republicans surrender to the British Army at the republicans' headquarters in Dublin. Several key figures of the Rising, including Patrick Pearse, Thomas MacDonagh, Tom Clarke and James Connolly, are executed by firing squad. Only Éamon de Valera is spared from execution due to his American citizenship, but is imprisoned alongside Michael Collins and Harry Boland.

The 1918 Irish general election results in the victorious Sinn Féin party unilaterally declaring Irish independence and in so doing beginning the Irish War of Independence. De Valera is elected President and Collins is appointed Director of Intelligence for the emerging IRA. Ned Broy, officially a member of the loyalist G Division, sympathises with the independence cause and tips Collins off that the Castle intends to arrest the entire Cabinet that evening. De Valera, sensing that the arrest will spark a worldwide outcry, dissuades his cabinet from going into hiding and persuades them to allow their arrests to take place. Collins and Boland evade arrest, though there is no response to the wider action.

As the last senior leader still free, Collins begins a counter-intelligence campaign with help from Broy. Numerous assassinations of agents and Irish collaborators are carried out by the IRA's Dublin Brigade. De Valera soon breaks out of Lincoln Prison, but announces on his return to Ireland that he will go to the United States to seek President Woodrow Wilson's official recognition of the Irish Republic. The war continues to intensify; the British assign SIS Officer Soames to counter the Irish Republican Army, though he and several of his agents are killed in an attack orchestrated by Collins. To retaliate, the Black and Tans are sent to Dublin to open fire on unarmed citizens who were in support of an independent Ireland; culminating in a massacre at Croke Park, in which 14 people are killed during a peaceful Gaelic football game. Broy's assistance to Collins is also discovered by Soames, who subsequently has Broy tortured and killed.

De Valera returns from the USA having been unable to secure President Wilson's support. The British hint at direct communication with the Irish, though Collins' guerilla campaign has boded poorly for Ireland's image. De Valera therefore decrees that the Irish Republican Army must fight as a conventional military, though Collins knows that this will just lead to another defeat against the might of the British Empire. Adamant in his approach to securing peace, de Valera orders a siege on the Custom House, but the Irish Republican Army suffers heavy casualties and the attack fails catastrophically. Despite the desperate situation the Irish Republican Army now finds itself in, the British unexpectedly call for a cease to the conflict.

Collins is sent to London to negotiate Irish interests as part of the Anglo-Irish Treaty, which is signed in 1921. Though Ireland is not immediately granted independence, the treaty enables Ireland to achieve it over time while remaining a British dominion during the interim as well as losing six of the nine Ulster counties, which will remain under British control. De Valera, who sought unconditional independence for Ireland, is furious upon learning of this and he and his supporters, including Boland, resign in protest. The subsequent people's vote backs the terms of the treaty, but de Valera rejects the result and in 1922 leads an attack on the Four Courts in Dublin. The National Army, led by Collins, is ordered to recapture it. In the subsequent Battle of Dublin, Boland is murdered.

Devastated upon learning of his friend's death, Collins journeys to West Cork, where de Valera is in hiding, to mediate peace. Collins, however, is misdirected by de Valera's associates and is led into an ambush in which he is shot and killed. Kitty Kiernan, Collins' love interest, is informed of his death just as she tries on a wedding gown.

== Cast ==
- Liam Neeson as Michael Collins
- Aidan Quinn as Harry Boland
- Stephen Rea as Ned Broy
- Alan Rickman as Éamon de Valera
- Julia Roberts as Kitty Kiernan
- Ian Hart as Joe O'Reilly
- Brendan Gleeson as Liam Tobin
- Stuart Graham as Tom Cullen
- Seán McGinley as Smith
- Gerard McSorley as Cathal Brugha
- Jonathan Rhys Meyers as Collins' Assassin
- Charles Dance as Soames, the British SIS officer who commands the Cairo Gang
- Owen O'Neill as Rory O'Connor
- Owen Roe as Arthur Griffith
- Ian McElhinney as Belfast Detective
- Gary Lydon as Squad Youth
- Jean Kennedy Smith (Uncredited cameo)
- Gary Powell as Black and Tan on Lorry

== Production ==
Michael Cimino wrote a script and was involved in pre-production work on a Collins film called Blest Souls for over a year in the late 1980s, with Sean Bean marked down to star. However, Cimino was fired over budget concerns. Neil Jordan mentions in his film diary that Kevin Costner had also been interested in developing a movie about Collins, titled Mick, and had visited Béal na Bláth and the surrounding areas.

The eventual film was scripted and directed by Neil Jordan and was an international co-production between companies in Ireland and the United States. With a budget estimated at $25 million, with 10%-12% from the Irish Film Board, it was one of the most expensive films ever produced in Ireland. While filming, the breakdown of the IRA ceasefire caused the film's release to be delayed from June to December. It also led to Warner Bros. executive Rob Friedman pressuring the director to reshoot the ending to focus on the love story between Collins and Kiernan, in an attempt to downplay the breakdown of Anglo-Irish Treaty negotiations.

Jordan had first met Liam Neeson while on the set of the John Boorman-directed epic fantasy film Excalibur, where Jordan was credited as a creative associate and Neeson had a supporting role as Sir Gawain. They became friends and Jordan revealed that he hoped to one day make a film about Collins, and if it came to pass that he would like for Neeson to be involved. Said longtime Jordan collaborator Stephen Woolley, "Liam Neeson was always going to be part of this film, from the moment Neil started writing it...It was Neil’s and Liam’s obsession right through the eighties and early nineties."

A number of Irish actors auditioned for the part of de Valera but Jordan felt they were performing a stereotype of de Valera rather than finding his true character. Jordan discussed the role with John Turturro before casting Alan Rickman. Jordan initially envisioned Stephen Rea playing Harry Boland, but then decided the role of Broy would give Rea more of a challenge. Matt Dillon and Adam Baldwin also auditioned for the role. Aengus O'Malley, a great-grandnephew of Michael Collins, played the role of a student filmed in Marsh's Library.

=== Soundtrack ===
The score was written by acclaimed composer Elliot Goldenthal, and features performances by Sinéad O'Connor. Frank Patterson also performs with the Cafe Orchestra in the film and on the album.

== Historicity ==
Although based on historical events, the film contains some alterations and fictionalisations, such as the dramatised circumstances of Harry Boland's death and Ned Broy's fate, as well as significant alterations to the formative years of Dáil Éireann and the prelude to the events of Bloody Sunday at Croke Park. Neil Jordan defended his film by saying that it could not provide an entirely accurate account of events since it was a two-hour film that had to be understandable to an international audience that would not know the minutiae of Irish history. The documentary on the DVD release of the film also discusses its fictional aspects.

The critic Roger Ebert referred to the closing quotation from de Valera that history would vindicate Collins at his own expense by writing that "even Dev could hardly have imagined this film biography of Collins, which portrays De Valera as a weak, mannered, sniveling prima donna whose grandstanding led to decades of unnecessary bloodshed in, and over, Ireland."

According to Alan Rickman, in the script there was a scene which made it clear that his character was not involved in the death of Michael Collins. However, this was cut (either by the director or the studio) in order to focus on a more romantic rather than political ending. Jordan has said that he never intended to indicate that de Valera had a hand in the assassination and has called the film's portrayal of de Valera "unfair".

Boland did not die in the manner suggested by the film. He was shot in a skirmish with Irish Free State soldiers in The Grand Hotel, Skerries, County Dublin, in the aftermath of the Battle of Dublin. The hotel has since been demolished, but a plaque was put where the building used to be. His last words in the film ("Have they got Mick Collins yet?") are based on a well-known tradition.

== Ratings ==
The Irish Film Censor initially intended to give the film an over-15 certificate, but later decided that it should be released with a PG certificate because of its historical importance. The censor issued a press statement defending his decision, claiming the film was a landmark in Irish cinema and that "because of the subject matter, parents should have the option of making their own decision as to whether their children should see the film or not". The video release was given a 12 certificate.

The film was rated 15 in the United Kingdom by the British Board of Film Classification.

The film was rated R in the United States by the Motion Picture Association of America.

== Reception ==
=== Box office ===
Michael Collins opened in six theatres in the United States on 11 October 1996 and grossed $182,221 for the weekend. It expanded to 748 theatres two weeks later grossing $2,409,761 for the weekend. It went on to gross $11.1 million in the United States and Canada. The film opened on 8 November 1996 in the UK and Ireland in 247 theatres and opened at number one at the box office with an opening weekend gross of £1,160,575, including £68,975 from previews in 45 theatres. The opening gross also included £442,867 from Ireland, which was a record opening for the country. The film went on to gross over £6.5 million in the UK and Ireland. It became the highest-grossing film ever in Ireland, surpassing Jurassic Park, grossing IR£4.27 million ($6.7 million). In 2000, it was second only to Titanic in this category. Internationally, it grossed $21.7 million for a worldwide total of $32.8 million.

=== Critical response ===
The film received generally positive reviews from critics, but was criticised by some for its historical inaccuracies. On Rotten Tomatoes, it has an approval rating of 78% based on 50 reviews, with an average rating of 6.90/10. The site's consensus states: "As impressively ambitious as it is satisfyingly impactful, Michael Collins honors its subject's remarkable achievements with a magnetic performance from Liam Neeson in the title role." On Metacritic, the film has a weighted average score of 60 out of 100 based on reviews from 20 critics, indicating "mixed or average reviews". Audiences polled by CinemaScore gave the film an average grade of "B+" on an A+ to F scale.

Irish journalist Kevin Myers, who is known for his criticism of physical force Irish republicanism, praised the film in his Irish Times column, writing, "I think it is magnificent. I was unable to leave the cinema at its end, so profoundly moved and saddened was I; and I can understand why Neil Jordan has been so personally offended by criticism of the film in Ireland and in Britain. It is a film which shows his passionate commitment to the subject, to the film, to Ireland, and, I believe, to peace." Geoff Andrew, writing in Time Out, said, "This is Jordan's most ambitious and satisfying movie - a thriller with a real sense of scale, pace, menace and moral import."

In Variety, the film was described as "Staggeringly well-made... a film of tremendous action, incident and momentum." Ian Nathan of Empire awarded the film four stars out of five, and described it as a "mature, passionate biography of the tragic Irish revolutionary [which] takes a considered, intelligent stance." Roger Ebert gave the film three stars out of four.

Irish writer Graham Linehan gave the film a positive review in the British film magazine Neon, and said, "If you’re Irish, the film obviously carries a huge emotional punch. But if you’re British, and you have even an iota of interest in a country that, after all, is RIGHT BESIDE YOU, then I suggest you toddle along."

=== Accolades ===
Award	Category	Nominee(s)	Result	Ref.
Academy Awards	Best Cinematography	Chris Menges	Nominated	
Academy Awards	Best Original Dramatic Score	Elliot Goldenthal	Nominated	
American Society of Cinematographers Awards	Outstanding Achievement in Cinematography in Theatrical Releases	Chris Menges	Nominated	
British Academy Film Awards	Best Actor in a Supporting Role	Alan Rickman	Nominated	
British Academy Film Awards	Best Cinematography	Chris Menges	Nominated	
British Society of Cinematographers Awards	Best Cinematography in a Theatrical Feature Film	Chris Menges	Nominated	
Chicago Film Critics Association Awards	Best Actor	Liam Neeson	Nominated	
Chicago Film Critics Association Awards	Best Cinematography	Chris Menges	Nominated	
Chicago Film Critics Association Awards	Best Original Score	Elliot Goldenthal	Nominated	
Evening Standard British Film Awards	Best Actor	Liam Neeson	Won	
Golden Globe Awards	Best Actor in a Motion Picture – Drama	Liam Neeson	Nominated	
Golden Globe Awards	Best Original Score – Motion Picture	Elliot Goldenthal	Nominated	
Los Angeles Film Critics Association Awards	Best Cinematography	Chris Menges	Won (Note: Tied with John Seale for The English Patient.)	
Los Angeles Film Critics Association Awards	Best Music Score	Elliot Goldenthal	Runner-up	
National Society of Film Critics Awards	Best Cinematography	Chris Menges	2nd Place	
Online Film & Television Association Awards	Best Drama Actor	Liam Neeson	Nominated	
Online Film & Television Association Awards	Best Cinematography	Chris Menges	Nominated	
Political Film Society Awards	Peace		Nominated	
Satellite Awards	Best Original Score	Elliot Goldenthal	Nominated	
Venice Film Festival	Golden Lion	Neil Jordan	Won	
Venice Film Festival	Best Actor	Liam Neeson	Won	
