= Irish Army Mutiny =

1924 Irish Army crisis

- Maj. Gen Liam Tobin, a leading figure in the Army Mutiny.
Date	March 1924
Location	Dublin, Irish Free State
Result	Government victory: Mutiny ends with no major fighting; government authority over the military reaffirmed; Richard Mulcahy later resigns

Belligerents
National Army	Irish Free State Government

Commanders and leaders
Liam Tobin; Charlie Dalton	W. T. Cosgrave; Kevin O'Higgins; Richard Mulcahy; Eoin O'Duffy

Strength
40–60 National Army officers	vast majority of the National Army

The Army Mutiny was an Irish Army crisis in March 1924 provoked by a proposed reduction in army numbers in the immediate post-Civil War period. A second grievance concerned the handling of the Northern Boundary problem. As the prelude to a coup d'état, the decisions made by influential politicians and soldiers at the time have continuing significance for the Government of Ireland.

== National Army ==
In the early weeks of the Civil War, the National Army comprised 7,000 men. These came mainly from pro-Treaty IRA brigades, especially the Dublin Guard whose members had personal ties to Michael Collins. They faced around 15,000 anti-Treaty IRA men and Collins needed to recruit experienced soldiers from wherever he could. The army's size mushroomed to 55,000 men, many of whom were Irishmen with combat experience in World War I – 20,000 National Volunteers had joined the British Army on the urgings of Nationalist leader John Redmond.

Likewise, Irishmen who had served in the British army accounted for over half of the 3,500 officers. W.R.E. Murphy, second-in-command (January–May 1923), had been a lieutenant colonel in the British Army, as had Emmet Dalton. Two more of the senior generals, John T. Prout and J.J. "Ginger" O'Connell, had served in the United States Army. Collins promoted fellow-members of the Irish Republican Brotherhood but was slow to put Squad members in high positions.

== Irish Republican Army Organisation ==
In December 1922, following Collins's death, Liam Tobin formed the Irish Republican Army Organisation (IRAO), taking in Dublin Guard and other Irish Army officers who shared his view that "higher command...was not sufficiently patriotic". President W. T. Cosgrave, head of the government, attempted to appease the IRAO. He met with them several times before the 1923 Irish general election and persuaded the opposing IRB faction of generals under Richard Mulcahy, to keep quiet.

With the election over, Mulcahy, as Minister of Defence, now ignored the IRAO as he started the process of demobilising 37,000 men. In November, 60 IRA officers mutinied and were dismissed without pay. The IRAO now pressured the Government into establishing a Committee to supervise future demobilisation. The committee, consisting of Eoin MacNeill, Ernest Blythe, and IRAO sympathiser Joseph McGrath, effectively undermined the authority of the Army Council.

== Ultimatum ==
On 7 March 1924 a representative of the IRAO handed a demand to end demobilisation to W. T. Cosgrave. The ultimatum was signed by senior Army officers, Major-General Liam Tobin and Colonel Charlie Dalton. Frank Thornton and Tom Cullen were also involved. Tobin knew his own position was to be scrapped in the demobilisation. That morning 35 men of the 36th Infantry Battalion had refused to parade and the preceding week officers had absconded with arms from Templemore, Gormanstown, Baldonnel Aerodrome and Roscommon. The immediate response was an order for the arrest of the two men on a charge of mutiny. This caused alarm throughout Dublin when announced.

On 8 March General Mulcahy made an announcement to the Army:

Two Army officers have attempted to involve the Army in a challenge to the authority of the Government. This is an outrageous departure from the spirit of the Army. It will not be tolerated...officers and men...will stand over their posts and do their duty today in this new threat of danger in the same wonderful determined spirit that has always been the spirit of the Army.

Leader of the Opposition, Thomas Johnson issued a statement of support for the Government. In contrast Minister for Industry and Commerce, Joseph McGrath, whose home Mulcahy ordered to be searched, resigned because of dissatisfaction with the government's attitude to the IRAO officers and support for their perception that the Irish Army treated officers who were British Army veterans better than former IRA officers. Fearing an incendiary speech by McGrath, Cosgrave first offered the IRAO an inquiry and an amnesty before then taking sick leave thus making Minister for Justice, Kevin O’Higgins, de facto head of the Government.

== Kevin O'Higgins ==
Observers at the time have provided insights into the motivations of Cosgrave and O'Higgins. Cosgrave was an "unpretentious and modest man", O'Higgins "redoubtable". Generals Costello and MacEoin recounted that Cosgrave feigned illness, hoping O’Higgins would talk himself into resigning. Mrs Mulcahy and Mrs Cosgrave agreed O'Higgins wanted Cosgrave to resign.

On 18 March 1924, 40 armed men assembled at Devlin's Hotel in Parnell Street, Dublin. Two lorry loads of troops were sent to surround the premises and a standoff developed with the mutineers. McGrath and Daniel McCarthy were allowed access as intermediaries. O'Higgins moved to resolve the problem. Strong reinforcements were dispatched. Tobin and Dalton were able to escape using an old path of retreat across the roofs, known from the days when Devlin's had been a safehouse for Michael Collins

The cabinet, already wary of the Free State Army, ordered an inquiry and appointed Garda Commissioner Eoin O'Duffy to the army command. The cabinet demanded the resignation of the army council and the generals resigned. The crisis within the army was solved but the government was divided, Richard Mulcahy, the Minister for Defence, resigned and O'Higgins was victorious in a very public power struggle within Cumann na nGaedheal with the events re-affirming the subservience of the military to the civilian government of the new state.

McGrath and eight other TDs resigned who had formed the National Group. However, Cumann na nGaedheal won seven of these and Sinn Féin won the other two.
