= Charlie Dalton =

Irish soldier (1903–1974)

- Born: 29 January 1903; Dublin, Ireland
- Died: 22 January 1974 (aged 70); Dublin, Ireland
- Burial place: Glasnevin Cemetery, Dublin
- Relatives: Emmet Dalton
- Military career
- Allegiance: Irish Republic; Irish Free State
- Service: Irish Volunteers; Irish Republican Army; National Army
- Service years: 1917-1919 (Irish Volunteers); 1919-1922 (IRA); 1922-1924 (National Army)
- Rank: Colonel
- Conflicts: Irish War of Independence; Irish Civil War

Charlie Dalton (29 January 1903 – 22 January 1974) was an Irish rebel, soldier and business man. Dalton was born at 8 St Columba's Road in Drumcondra, Dublin on 29 January 1903 to laundry manager James Dalton and Catherine Riley. In 1917, aged 14 he joined the Irish Volunteers. In 1920, he joined The Squad, and participated in Bloody Sunday killing two British army officers. He joined the National Army becoming a colonel. In October 1922, he took custody of three teenage boys who were later found shot dead at Red Cow in south Dublin. As the wartime army was being demobilised, Dalton was demoted to commandant in early 1924. Along with Major General Liam Tobin, he demanded the government suspend demobilisation causing the Army Mutiny. The government ordered their arrest, and Dalton was forced to resign from the army in March 1929.

In October 1928, he married Teresa Morgan in Dublin. In 1929, he published a memoir entitled 'With The Dublin Brigade' He died 22 January 1974, at age 70. His brother was the soldier and film producer, Emmet Dalton.
