= Charles Dalton (disambiguation) =

Charles Dalton (1850–1933) was a Canadian businessman and politician

Charles Dalton may also refer to:

- Charles Dalton (actor) (1864–1942), American stage actor
- Chuck Dalton (1927–2013), Canadian basketball player
- Charlie Dalton, Irish revolutionary
