= Emmet Dalton =

Irish army officer and film producer

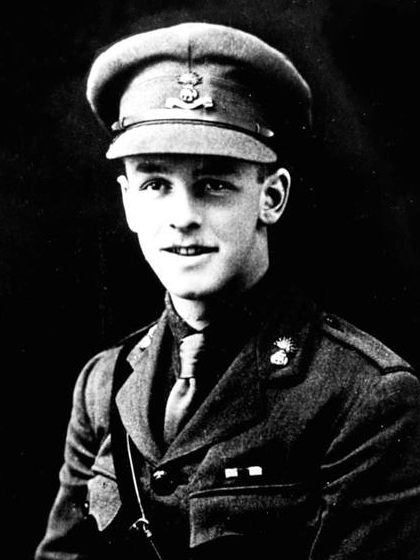
- Dalton photographed in lieutenant's uniform, Royal Dublin Fusiliers
- Born: 4 March 1898; Fall River, Massachusetts, United States
- Died: 4 March 1978 (aged 80); Dublin, Ireland
- Burial place: Glasnevin Cemetery, Dublin
- Spouse: Alice Shannon (m. 1922)
- Children: Audrey Dalton
- Relatives: Charlie Dalton
- Military career
- Allegiance: United Kingdom; Irish Republic; Irish Free State
- Service: Irish Volunteers; British Army; Irish Republican Army; National Army
- Service years: 1913-1915 (Irish Volunteers); 1916-1919 (British Army); 1919-1922 (IRA); 1922 (National Army)
- Rank: Captain (British Army); Major general (National Army)
- Unit: Royal Dublin Fusiliers (British Army)
- Commands: Director of Military Operations; GOC Eastern Command; (National Army)
- Conflicts: First World War; Battle of the Somme; Battle of Ginchy; Irish War of Independence; Irish Civil War
- Awards: Military Cross

James Emmet Dalton, MC (4 March 1898 – 4 March 1978) was an Irish army officer and film producer. He served in the British Army in the First World War, reaching the rank of captain. On his return to Ireland he became a senior figure in the Dublin Brigade of the Irish Republican Army fighting against British rule in Ireland.

A close associate of Michael Collins he was military liaison officer for the treaty talks. During the Irish Civil War, he was a major general in the pro-Treaty National Army but resigned his command following the death of Collins. Dalton later founded a film production company in London and founded Ardmore Studios in Wicklow together with Louis Elliman in 1958, producing a number of notable pictures in the 1950s and 1960s.

== Early life ==
Dalton was born in Fall River, Massachusetts, to Irish-American parents James F. and Katharine L. Dalton (née Riley). The family moved back to Ireland when he was two. He grew up in a middle-class Catholic background in Drumcondra in North Dublin and lived at No. 8 Upper St. Columba's Road. He was educated by the Christian Brothers at O'Connell School in North Richmond Street. He joined the nationalist militia, the Irish Volunteers in 1913 and the following year, though only fifteen, was involved in the smuggling of arms into Ireland.

== Military career ==
=== First World War ===
Along with over 20,000 National Volunteers who heeded the call of Nationalist leader John Redmond, he joined the British Army in 1915, much to his father's disapproval. Dalton initially joined the 7th Battalion of the Royal Dublin Fusiliers (RDF) as a temporary 2nd Lieutenant. By 1916, he was attached to the 9th Battalion, RDF, 16th (Irish) Division under Major-General William Hickie, which contained many Irish nationalist recruits.

During the Battle of the Somme in September 1916, Dalton was involved in bloody fighting during the Battle of Ginchy, in which over 4,000 Irishmen were killed or wounded. Among the casualties was Tom Kettle, a former nationalist Member of Parliament and personal friend of Dalton's father and of Emmet. Dalton was awarded the Military Cross for his conduct in the battle. Afterwards he was transferred to the 6th Battalion, Leinster Regiment, and sent to Salonika then Palestine, where he commanded a company and then supervised a sniper school in El Arish. In 1918 Dalton was re-deployed again to France, and in July promoted to captain, serving as an instructor.

=== Irish War of Independence ===
After demobilisation in April 1919, Dalton returned to Ireland, and on finding his younger brother Charlie had joined the IRA, Dalton himself followed suit. Dalton later commented on the apparent contradiction of fighting both with and against the British Army by saying that he had fought for Ireland with the British and fought for Ireland against them. As assistant director of training, he became close to Michael Collins and was involved in the Squad, the Dublin-based assassination unit. On 14 May 1921, Dalton led an operation with Paddy Daly that Dalton and Collins had devised. It was designed to rescue Gen. Sean McEoin from Mountjoy Prison using a hijacked British armoured car and two of Dalton's old British Army uniforms.

=== Irish Civil War ===
Dalton followed Collins in accepting the Anglo-Irish Treaty in 1922 and joined the new National Army established by the Irish Provisional Government of the Irish Free State as a major general. The Treaty was opposed by much of the IRA and the Irish Civil War between pro and anti-treaty factions eventually resulted. Dalton was in command of troops assaulting the Four Courts in the Battle of Dublin which marked the start of the war in June 1922. At Collins' instigation Dalton, as military liaison officer with the British during the truce, took control of the two 18-pounder guns from the British that were trained on the buildings. He was behind the Irish Free State offensive of July–August 1922 that dislodged the anti-treaty fighters from the towns of Munster. Dalton proposed seaborne landings to take the anti-treaty positions from the rear, and he commanded one such naval landing that took Cork city in early August. In spite of firm loyalty to the National Army, he was critical of the Free State's failure to follow up its victory, allowing the anti-treaty IRA to regroup resuming the guerrilla warfare started in 1919. On 22 August 1922, he accompanied Michael Collins in convoy, touring rural west Cork. The convoy was ambushed near Béal na Bláth and Collins was killed in the firefight. Dalton had advised him to drive on, but Collins, who was not an experienced combat veteran, insisted on stopping to fight.

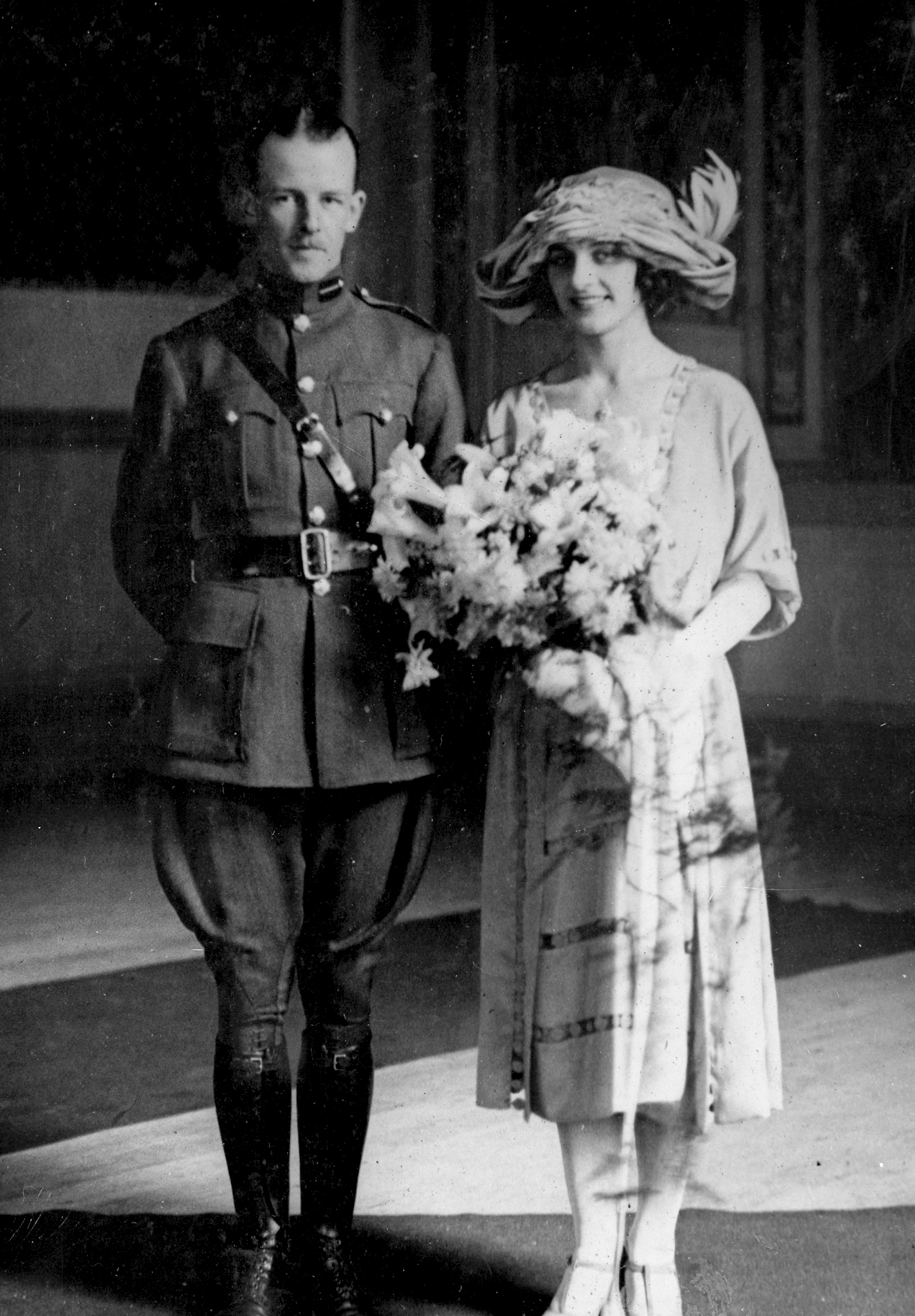
Emmet Dalton and Alice Shannon following their wedding in October 1922

== Film industry ==
Dalton married Alice Shannon on 9 October 1922 in Cork's Imperial Hotel. Collins' death hit Dalton hard, and he went on the drink. The government offered him the clerkship of the Seanad, which he accepted, resigning from the army in December 1922. However, ill health and other strains led to frequent absences, and he was encouraged to resign three years later. During the inter-war years, Dalton worked as a salesman for various companies, and joined Paramount in England during the war. Post war he worked for Samuel Goldwyn before going into film production himself in the 1950s. In 1958, he founded Irish Ardmore Studios in Bray. His company helped produce films such as The Blue Max, The Spy Who Came in from the Cold and The Lion in Winter, all of which were filmed in Ireland. His daughter is Irish actress Audrey Dalton.

== Death ==
Emmet Dalton died in his daughter Nuala's house in Dublin in 1978 on his 80th birthday, never having seen the film that Cathal O'Shannon of RTÉ had made on his life. During the making of the film they visited the battlefields in France (including Ginchy and Guillemont on the Somme), Kilworth Camp in Cork, Béal Na Bláth, and other places that Dalton had not visited since his earlier years. He wished to be buried as near as possible to his friend Michael Collins in Glasnevin Cemetery in Dublin, and was buried there in March 1978 after a military funeral. None of the ruling Fianna Fáil government ministers or TDs attended.

== Reading references ==
- Cottrell, Peter (2008). The Irish Civil War 1922–23. Oxford: Osprey Publishing. ISBN 978-1-84603-270-7. OCLC 183265280.
- Turtle Bunbury, The Glorious Madness, Tales of The Irish and The Great War
- Kettle, Tom & Dalton, Emmet, Mad Guns and Invisible Wands (Gill & Macmillan, Dublin 2014), pp. 99–115, ISBN 978-0-7171-6234-5
- Richardson, Neil David (2010). A coward if I return, a hero if I fall : stories of Irish soldiers in World War I. Dublin: O'Brien. ISBN 978-1-84717-131-3. OCLC 648100765.
- Townshend, Charles, Easter 1916: The Irish Rebellion (London 2006)
- Townshend, Charles, The Republic: The Fight For Independence (London 2013)
