= New Ireland Assurance =

Insurance company in Dublin, Ireland

New Ireland Assurance Company plc
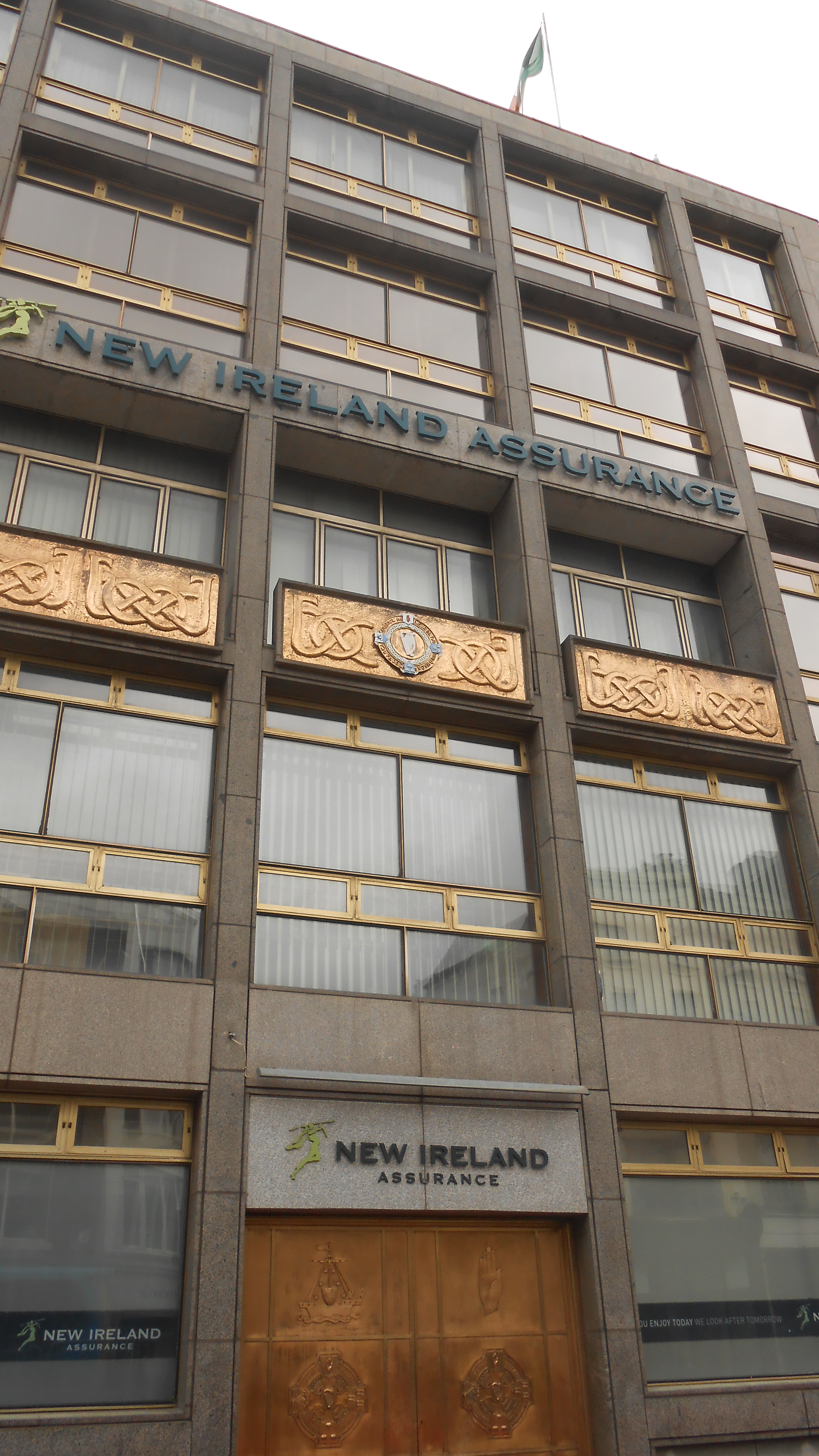
- Native name: Comhlucht na hÉireann um Árachas cpt
- Formerly: New Ireland Assurance Collecting Society
- Company type: Subsidiary
- Industry: Financial services
- Founded: January 1918; 108 years ago
- Headquarters: Dublin, Ireland
- Parent: Bank of Ireland
- Website: www.newireland.ie

New Ireland Assurance Company plc (Irish: Comhlucht na hÉireann um Árachas cpt) is an insurance company in Ireland with origins in Ireland's independence movement. The company is a wholly owned subsidiary of Bank of Ireland.

It was founded as the New Ireland Assurance Collecting Society in January 1918. by amongst others, Frank Thornton while still in prison. Thornton became assistant manager in 1924, manager in 1954, and general manager in 1959

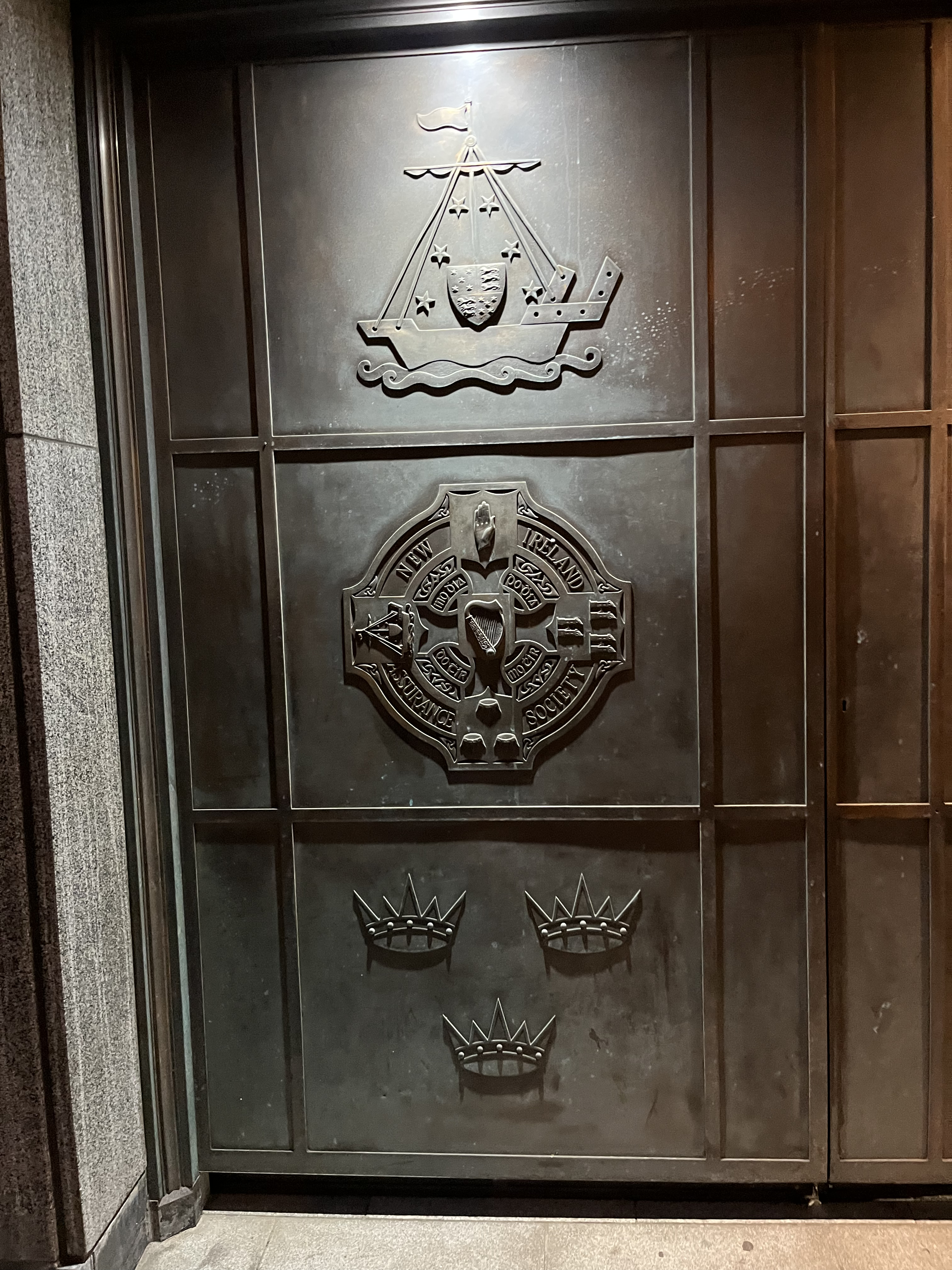
Door of former New Ireland Assurance offices at 9-12 Dawson Street, Dublin

The business was located in dedicated offices in an unusual Celtic Revival style at 9-12 Dawson Street but in later years is moved to Ballsbridge.
