= Burning of the Custom House =

IRA attack on The Custom House in Dublin

- Part of the Irish War of Independence
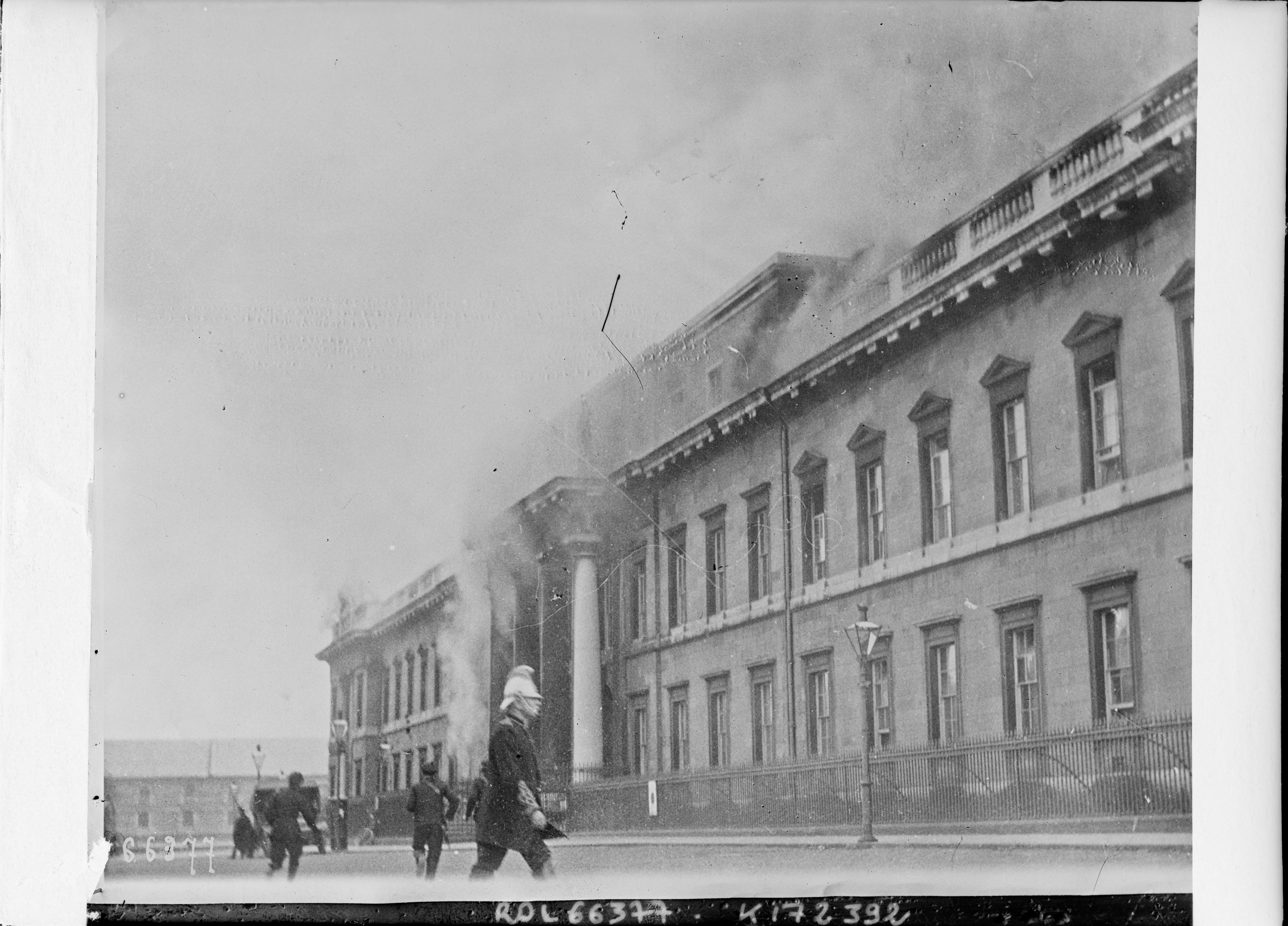
- The Custom House in flames
Date	25 May 1921
Location	Custom House, central Dublin 53.3485°N 6.2531°W
Result	IRA destroy Custom House but many are captured

Belligerents
Irish Republican Army	(United Kingdom of Great Britain and Ireland) Royal Irish Constabulary (Auxiliary Division), (United Kingdom of Great Britain and Ireland) British Army

Commanders and leaders
Tom Ennis	

Strength
c. 120	c. 120 Auxiliaries at first; members of Wiltshire Regiment arrived later

Casualties and losses
5 killed 3 wounded 70–80 captured	4 wounded
- 3 civilians killed, 7 wounded

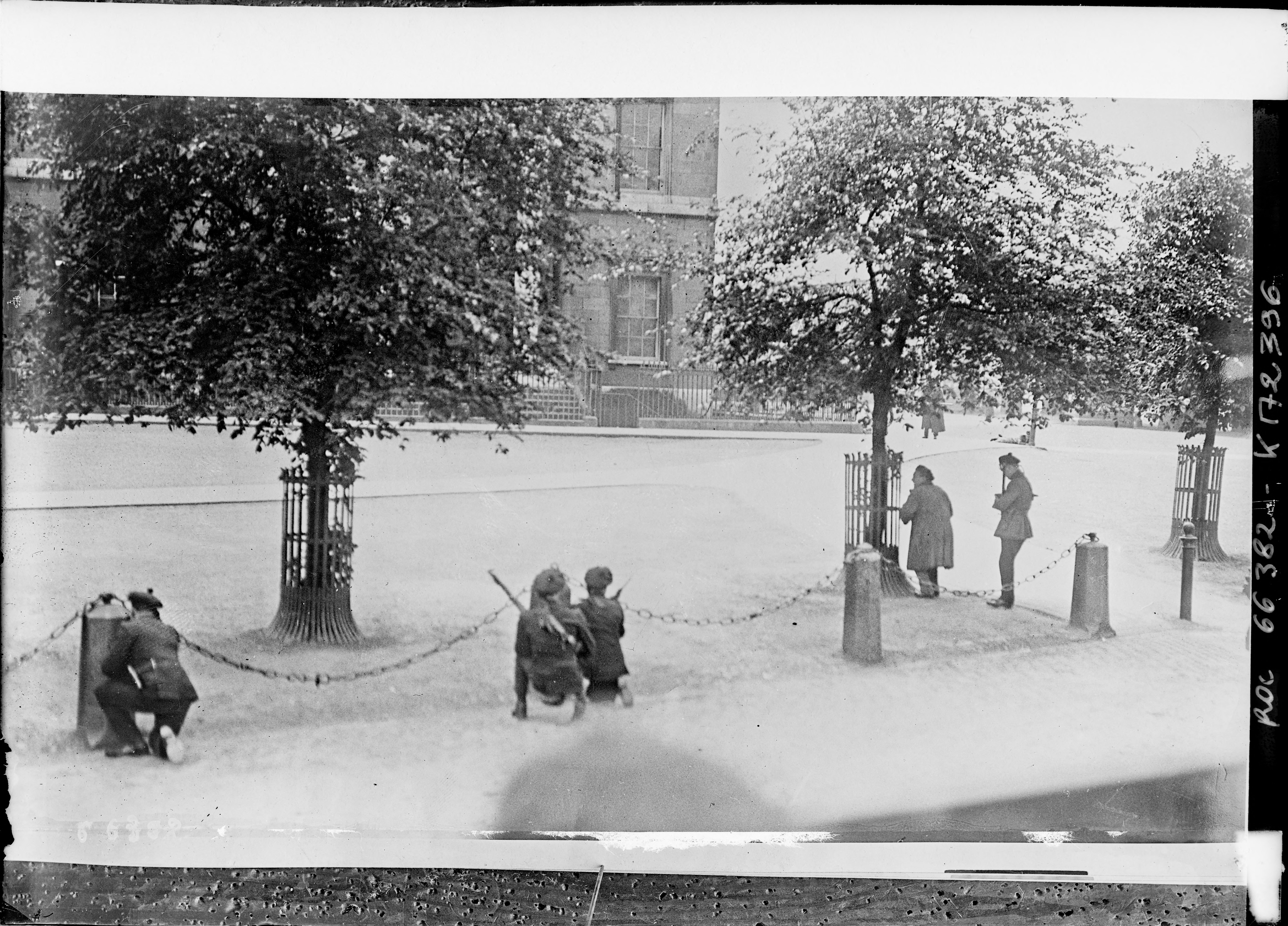
Auxiliaries outside the Custom House during the gun battle

On 25 May 1921, during the Irish War of Independence, the Custom House in Dublin was occupied and then burnt in an operation by the Irish Republican Army (IRA). The Custom House was the headquarters of the Local Government Board for Ireland, an agency of the British administration in Ireland, against which the IRA was fighting in the name of the self-proclaimed Irish Republic. The operation, involving over 100 IRA volunteers, was a propaganda coup for the republicans but a military disaster for the IRA in the Irish capital. A force of British Auxiliaries quickly arrived and a gun battle erupted. Five IRA volunteers were killed (John Doyle, Edward Dorins, Daniel Head, Captain Patrick & Lieutenant Stephen O'Reilly), along with three civilians, and about 80 volunteers were captured.

The operation was the largest action in Dublin by rebels since the Easter Rising.

== Background ==
The Irish War of Independence was a guerrilla campaign by the IRA in support of the Irish Republic. The conflict entered its bloodiest phase in the first six months of 1921. In Dublin, a total of 309 people were killed in the conflict and several hundred more wounded.

Dublin was garrisoned by over 10,000 British troops and 1,600 police including 400 men of the RIC Auxiliary Division. Most IRA actions in the city consisted either of assassinations of selected police, military or administration figures by the Squad, or ambushes on British forces by one of the four Active Service Units of the IRA's Dublin Brigade (together comprising about 100 men). These were usually rapid and fleeting attacks using grenades and handguns, followed by a quick getaway. There were strict orders given to IRA units to avoid prolonged engagements with the better-armed British forces.

However, this policy was reversed after a meeting of the Ministry of Dáil Éireann in May 1921 where the President of the Republic, Éamon de Valera, called for a spectacular public show of force by the IRA, to reinforce the idea that it was an army representing an Irish government. For this reason it was decided to attack and burn the Custom House, which, although an important government building, was not defended by the British military. Michael Collins was against the attack but was overruled.

Michael O'Kelly, Lieutenant E Company, 2nd Battalion, Dublin Brigade, recalled plans to "deliver a smashing blow to England". Two large scale operations - to capture Beggars Bush Barracks, or to destroy the Customs House were initially considered. The Custom House was eventually chosen. IRA member Vincent Byrne said that the operation was "one of many under review" and that another proposal had been to attack Beggars Bush Barracks.

== The attack ==
In the early afternoon of 25 May 1921, roughly 120 non-uniformed IRA Volunteers began to gather around the Custom House in groups of twos and threes. 75 percent of those involved belonged to the 2nd Battalion of the Dublin Brigade under Tom Ennis. Only a minority of them were experienced guerrilla fighters and they were armed only with pistols and a limited amount of ammunition. At 1 p.m., they rushed the Custom House and overpowered the police guard. A lorry pulled-up outside the building with tins of petrol and bales of cotton, which were then sprinkled throughout the building. The IRA Volunteers herded all the staff into the main hall. The caretaker of the building (Francis Davis) was shot dead when he tried to call the police.

However, at about 1.10pm, a watching policeman notified British forces and 60 Auxiliaries in three lorries and an armored car quickly arrived on the scene. IRA Volunteers from the 1st, 3rd and 4th battalions were positioned outside the building to stop the enemy from approaching.

Four Auxiliaries were wounded in a gun battle with one of these IRA protection teams outside the building. Other Auxiliaries fired into the building with rifles and Lewis machine guns, exchanging fire with the IRA fighters inside. A number of IRA Volunteers and civilians were killed or wounded by the Auxiliaries. As fighting raged outside, IRA Volunteers inside the building were ordered to set it alight.

The ammunition of the IRA Volunteers quickly ran out and the firefight ended within 30 minutes. Some Volunteers were shot as they tried to run away. Tom Ennis, in command of the operation, escaped but was hit twice in the leg. Many others were arrested along with civilians as they came out of the now burning Custom House with their hands up. The Fire Brigade, which had been delayed from responding by other IRA companies in the city, arrived too late to put out the fire.

17 year old Daniel 'Dan' Head was shot after throwing a hand grenade at an Auxiliary lorry which resulted in casualties.

British military forces composed of units from the Wiltshire Regiment arrived and took over the operation from the Auxiliaries at this point. A total of 111 people were arrested, of whom 70–80 were IRA members.

The Custom House burned for five days and was all but completely destroyed by the fire. With it were destroyed many centuries of local government records. The Irish Bulletin, official gazette of the Irish Republic, reported:

A detachment of the Dublin Brigade of the Irish Army was ordered to carry out the destruction of the Custom House in accordance with a decision arrived at after due deliberation of the ministry of Dáil Éireann. We in common with the rest of the nation regret the destruction of historical buildings. But the lives of four million people are a more cherished charge than any architectural masterpiece. The Custom House was the seat of an alien tyranny.

== Aftermath ==
From the republican point of view, the operation was successful for its propaganda value, but it was a heavy blow in terms of the numbers lost, both killed and arrested. Following the operation, the Dublin Brigade and The Squad were amalgamated into the Dublin Guard. However, the operation did not totally impede the IRA's campaign in Dublin. The Dublin Brigade carried out 107 attacks in the city in May and 93 in June, showing a fall-off but not a dramatic one.

The memoir of Harry Colley, Adjutant of the Dublin IRA, estimated the numbers in the 5 Dublin battalions at 1,400 in early 1921.

The armed conflict was brought to an end on 11 July 1921 and negotiations were opened which would produce the Anglo-Irish Treaty in December of that year. The Custom House was re-built after the end of the war.

Irish local government records from the 1600s had been brought from rural parts of Ireland to the Custom House for safekeeping, and these were lost in the blaze. At the time, The New York Times subtitled their report on the fire as "Priceless Records Lost".

Historian Patrick Maume, writing in Fortnight magazine in 1998, noted that the use of Irish limestone instead of Portland stone to rebuild the damaged portions of the Dublin Customs House in the 1920s shows the posthumous influence of politician Arthur Griffith (1871–1922), who "regularly attacked" the use of imported stone on Irish public buildings.
