= Vinny Byrne =

Member of the Irish Republican Army

Vincent Byrne (23 November 1900 – 13 December 1992) was a member of the Irish Republican Army and a senior figure in the assassination group known as The Squad.

== Pre IRA ==
In 1915 he joined the 2nd battalion of the Dublin Brigade of the Irish Volunteers at age 14. On Easter Monday 1916 he assembled in Saint Stephen's Green and was supposed to march over to Jacobs Factory where he would remain for the rest of the week. He was told to go home and started to cry. On his way home he ran into his section commander who asked him what was wrong. When Byrne explained what had happened he was brought back to the Green.

He spent the remainder of the week in Jacobs Factory under the command of Thomas McDonagh. When the rebels surrendered he escaped to his home but was arrested a week later and taken to Richmond Barracks.

== The Squad ==
On the morning of the day of Bloody Sunday Byrne was in command of the IRA unit which assassinated Lieutenant Peter Ashmun Ames and Lieutenant Bennett in their room at 38 Upper Mount Street, Dublin. As he and his men were fleeing they got into a shoot out with British agents.

== Post war of independence ==
He fought on the Pro-Treaty side during the civil war. He joined the Irish National Army and reached the rank of Commandant-Colonel

He died 13 December 1992. He is survived by two daughters and a son.
