= J. J. "Ginger" O'Connell =

Irish revolutionary

J. J. O'Connell
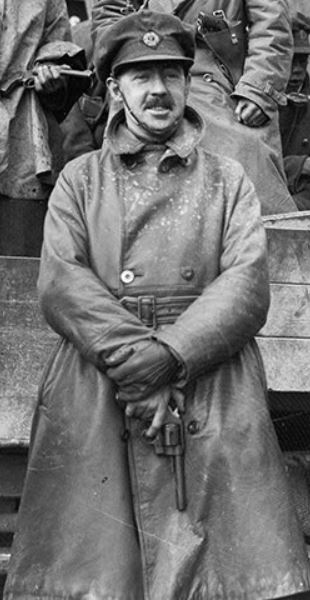
- Lt.-General O'Connell in 1922
- Born: Jeremiah Joseph O'Connell; 21 December 1887; Ballina, County Mayo, Ireland
- Died: 19 February 1944 (aged 56); Richmond Hospital, Dublin, Ireland
- Education: University College Dublin
- Military career
- Allegiance: United States (1912–1914); Irish Republic (1914–1922); Irish Free State (from 1922)
- Branch: US Army (1912–1914); Irish Volunteers (1914–1919); Irish Republican Army (1919–1922); National Army (1922–1924); Irish Defence Forces (1924–1944)
- Rank: General officer commanding (prior to demotion)
- Nickname: Ginger O'Connell
- Unit: 69th Infantry Regiment (New York) (U.S. Army)
- Commands: Curragh Camp & Curragh Command
- Conflicts: Irish War of Independence; Irish Civil War

Jeremiah Joseph "Ginger" O'Connell (21 December 1887 – 19 February 1944) was an Irish revolutionary, active in the Irish War of Independence, and later a senior officer in the Irish Defence Forces.

== Early life ==
O'Connell was born on 21 December 1887 in Ballina, County Mayo, to Jeremiah Ambrose and Winifred O'Connell. He was nicknamed "Ginger" because of his red hair. His father was a national school inspector, so the family lived in Sligo, Derry, Longford and Belfast, and Ginger attended a succession of primary schools. He studied in University College Dublin where he received a Bachelor of Arts and a first class Master of Arts. He was a member of the Literary and Historical Society, and had an interest in boxing.

He was living in Cavan with his father, his sister Mary Margaret, his brother John Aloysius and two servants, Mary Burke and Rose Anne O'Reilly, at the time of the 1911 census, when he was 23. He was working as a Solicitor's Apprentice, could read and write as well as speak both English and Irish, and was single. His mother was not living as it is recorded that his father was a widower.

== Irish Volunteers ==
O'Connell spent some time in the U.S. Army, serving with the 69th Infantry Regiment (New York) between 1912 and 1914. He returned to Ireland in 1914 and joined the Irish Volunteers, becoming Chief of Inspection in 1915. He travelled the country organising volunteer corps, as well as contributing to the Irish Volunteer's journal and delivering lectures on military tactics to both the Volunteers and Fianna Éireann. He also delivered a series of lectures about the famous Irish battles to the Gaelic League in Dublin. He was not a member of the Irish Republican Brotherhood as he believed that soldiers should not be a part of secret societies.

At the time the 1916 Easter Rising, O'Connell was operating in Dublin under instruction from Joseph Plunkett. He was dispatched to Cork by Eoin MacNeill with a message to cancel the Rising. Following the Rising, he was arrested and held in Frongoch internment camp from April to July 1916. In 1918 he was again arrested and interned, spending time in Wandsworth Prison with Arthur Griffith for the alleged involvement in the fabricated German Plot.

During the Irish War of Independence, he was a member of the Irish Republican Army (IRA) headquarters staff, as assistant director of Training and, after the killing of Dick McKee, as Director of Training. He coordinated, and was the principal lecturer, for a training course for military officers. The course was run clandestinely in the premises of the Topographical Society on Gardiner Street in Dublin. A sympathetic doorkeeper allowed O'Connell's group in at night when the society was not present. Topics delivered by O'Connell included tactics, ordinance and engineering.

== Irish Defence Forces ==
In the IRA split after the Second Dáil ratified the Anglo-Irish Treaty in a vote in January 1922, O'Connell took the pro-Treaty side. He was made Deputy Chief of Staff in the National Army. On 26 June 1922, he was kidnapped by anti-treaty forces in reprisal for the arrest of anti-treaty officer, Leo Henderson. O'Connell's kidnapping was a precipitating factor in the formal outbreak of the Irish Civil War, when government pro-treaty forces two days later attacked anti-treaty forces occupying the Four Courts. O'Connell survived the fighting and spent the rest of the civil war as General Officer Commanding (GOC) for Currgah Camp and Curragh Command.

Following the Civil War, the National Army was reorganised, and as part of that O’Connell was demoted twice: once from GOC to Major-General, and for a final time to the rank of Colonel, which he maintained for the remainder of his career. He subsequently held a variety of positions: chief lecturer in the army school of instruction (1924–1929); director of no. 2 (intelligence) bureau (known then as G2; 1929–1932); OC Equitation School (March–June 1932); Quartermaster-general (1932–1935) and director of the military archives (1935–1944). He also published articles on Irish and foreign military history and tactics in his time as a military historian. He married Gertrude McGilligan, the sister of political leader Patrick McGilligan, and they had two children together - one son and one daughter.

Colonel O'Connell died after a heart attack on 19 February 1944 at the Dolphin Hotel in Dublin and was dead on admission to Richmond Hospital.
