= Liam Tobin =

Irish army general (1895–1963)

Tobin at the funeral of Michael Collins in 1922

Liam Tobin (15 November 1895 – 30 April 1963) was an officer in the Irish Army and the instigator of an Irish Army Mutiny in March 1924. During the Irish War of Independence, he served as an IRA intelligence officer for Michael Collins' Squad.

Tobin was portrayed by actor Brendan Gleeson in Neil Jordan's biopic Michael Collins.

== Early life ==
William Joseph Tobin was born at 13 Great Georges Street in Cork on 15 November 1895, the eldest son of Mary Agnes (nee Butler) and David Tobin, a hardware clerk. Tobin had two younger siblings, Katherine and Nicholas Augustine Tobin, also born in Cork City. Tobin's family moved to John St. in Kilkenny and then to Dublin. Tobin went to school in Kilkenny and was an apprentice in a hardware shop at the time of the 1916 Rising.

Tobin fought in the Four Courts Garrison under Edward Daly. He was arrested and courtmartialed. He was sentenced to death and then had his sentence commuted to life imprisonment. Tobin was a prisoner in Kilmainham Gaol, Mountjoy, Lewes, Dartmoor, Broadmoor and Pentonville prisons. He was released in June 1917.

== The intelligence war ==
Early in 1919, Tobin had become Collins' chief executive in the Intelligence Directorate handling the many spies in Dublin Castle, including double agent David Neligan. Nancy O'Brien worked for Under-Secretary for Ireland James Macmahon, decoding messages sent from London. Each day between 2:30 and 3:30 she would pass any information acquired to either Tobin, Joe McGrath, or Desmond Fitzgerald. Tobin was involved in planning the assassinations of military officers, police officials, intelligence agents and informers. He constructed detailed profiles of everyone remotely connected to the British government, often using Who's Who, The Morning Post, and The Times – a newspaper that described him as "one of the most formidable of [the] Twelve Apostles".

Collins' intelligence operations were based at 3 Crow Street, Dublin, where Tobin had the assistance of Tom Cullen and Frank Thornton. In October 1921, Tobin travelled with the Irish Treaty Delegation to London as part of Collins' personal staff.

=== Henry Wilson ===
The historians Tim Pat Coogan and James Mackay have examined Tobin's involvement in the assassination of Field Marshal Sir Henry Wilson. Wilson's public tirades about Collins was evidence of mutual personal dislike between the two men. In May 1922 Collins told Tobin "We'll kill a member of that bunch" to the news of "bloody pogroms" in Belfast and Bloody Sunday (1921). Wilson, an Irish Protestant, had been intimately involved with the Ulster loyalist cause, including the Curragh Mutiny and the establishment of the Ulster Special Constabulary.

Just before the shooting, Coogan places Tobin in London. He met courier Peig Ni Braonain at Euston Station collecting a document that had been sent from Dublin. Returning to Dublin before the incident, Tobin was jubilant when he told defence minister Richard Mulcahy about Wilson's death. Mulcahy was appalled and threatened to resign. On 10 August 1922, two London-based members of the IRA, Reginald Dunne and Joseph O'Sullivan were hung in London for the killing of Wilson.

== Irish Free State ==
Following the Anglo-Irish Treaty, he was appointed deputy director of intelligence in the new state and assigned to the Criminal Investigation Department based at Oriel House. However Collins would soon replace him with Joseph McGrath. Tobin was placed on the Army Council and was Director of Intelligence from September 1922 until his appointment as Senior Aide-de-Camp to the new Governor General, Tim Healy in November 1922. The position provided an apartment in Viceregal Lodge.

In October 1922, Tobin's brother Nicholas, a Free State captain, was accidentally shot dead by his own troops during the raid and capture of a bomb making factory at number 8 Gardiner's Place, Dublin.

Tobin believed in the stepping stone doctrine which saw the Treaty as a stage towards full independence. With the outbreak of the Irish Civil War he remained loyal to Collins and took the Pro-Treaty side. He led in the fight against the Anti-Treaty IRA in the south. Disillusioned with the continuing hostilities and in the aftermath of the death of General Collins he formed an association called the IRA Organisation (IRAO) or "Old Irish Republican Army" to distinguish themselves from the anti-treaty insurgents.

=== Army Mutiny ===
Richard Mulcahy, the new Irish defence minister, proposed to reduce the army from 55,000 to 18,000 men in the immediate post- Civil-War period. Tobin knew his own position was to be affected and shared the perception that the Irish Army treated officers who were British Army veterans better than former IRA officers. On 7 March 1924 Tobin, together with Colonel Charles Dalton, sent an ultimatum to President W. T. Cosgrave demanding an end to the army demobilisation. The immediate response was an order for the arrest of the two men on a charge of mutiny. The cabinet, already wary of the Irish Army, ordered an inquiry and appointed Garda Commissioner Eoin O'Duffy to the army command.

On 18 March, the mutineers assembled with hostile intent at a Dublin pub. An order was made to arrest the mutineers and the cabinet demanded the resignation of the army council. The generals resigned, affirming the subservience of the military to the civilian government of the new state.

== Later career ==
In later years, Tobin would rebuild relations with his Civil War foes and joined De Valera's Anti-Treaty Fianna Fáil Party. Tobin joined up with Joseph McGrath to form the Irish Hospitals' Sweepstake in the 1930s. Many other former army comrades found work in this lottery. Tobin left the Sweep in 1938. After World War II, Tobin became Superintendent of the Oireachtas for the Irish Dáil.

== Personal life ==
On 14 October 1929, Tobin married Monica "Mona" Higgins, at the Church of the Holy Family, Aughrim St, in Dublin, and had two daughters, Máire and Anne Tobin. Following the death of Tobin's father, David, in 1956, Tobin's health declined, resulting in his death on 30 April 1963 in Dublin, aged 68 years.
