= Oriel House, Westland Row =

Victorian office building in Dublin, Ireland

Coordinates: 53.342008°N 6.250234°W

Oriel House
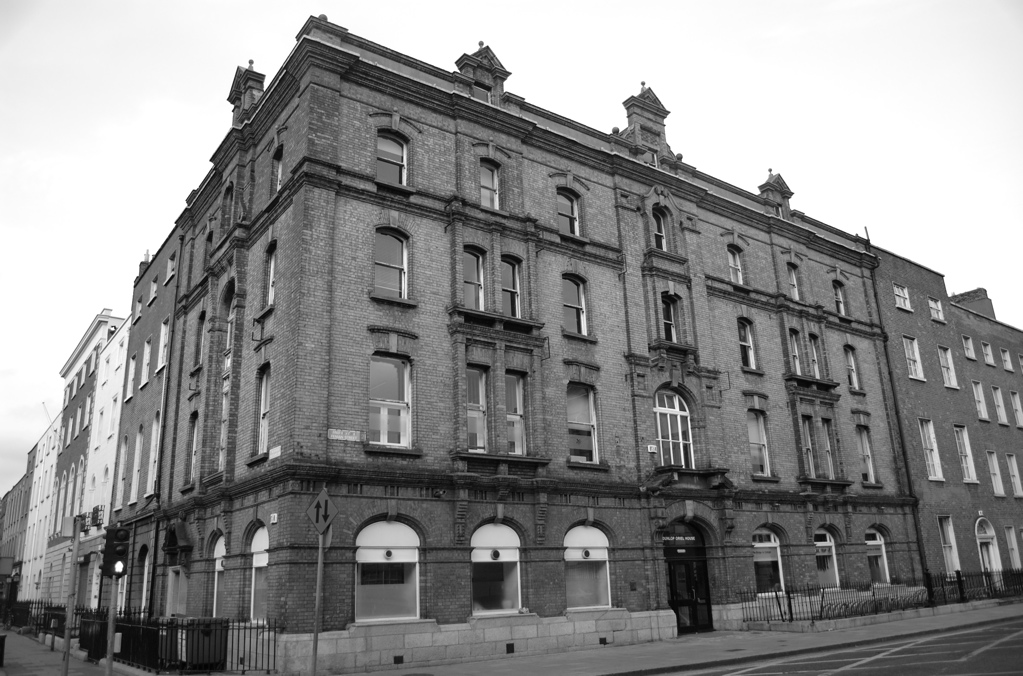
- South façade, Oriel House, Westland Row
- Interactive map of the Oriel House area
- Former names: Dunlop House

General information
- Type: Offices
- Architectural style: Victorian
- Location: Westland Row/Fenian St., Dublin, 35 Fenian Street, Dublin 2
- Completed: 1872
- Owner: Trinity College Dublin

Oriel House, Westland Row is a building at the intersection of Westland Row and Fenian Street in Dublin. It is owned by Trinity College Dublin and serves as the headquarters for CONNECT, the Centre for Future Networks and Communications (formerly CTVR), a Science Foundation Ireland-sponsored research centre.

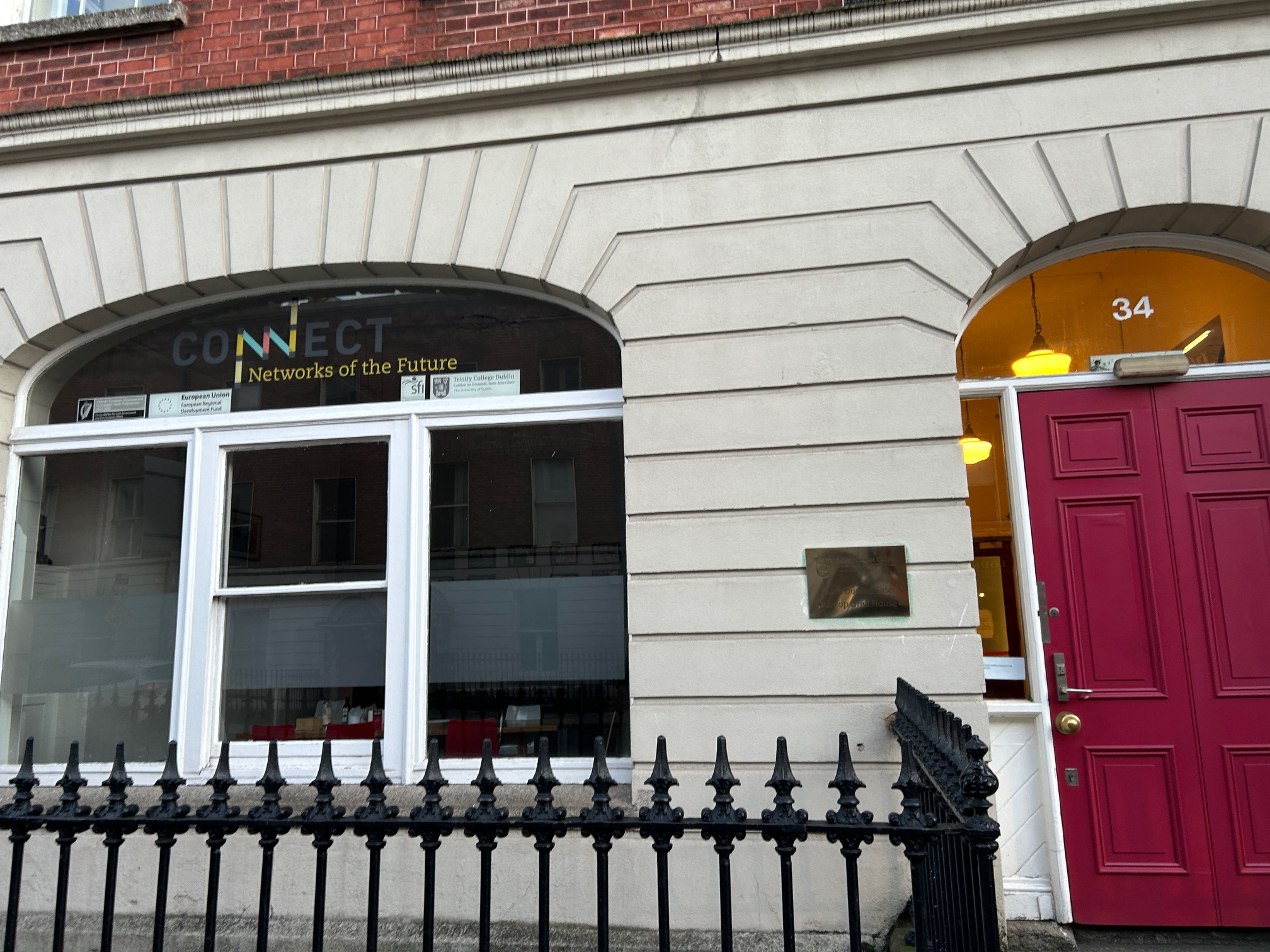
TCD Connect (including CTVR) research centre

== Overview ==
Oriel House was the address at which a US pneumatic tyre patent was drafted in 1893 'for the wheels of Velocipedes and other Vehicles'. The house served as headquarters for the Dunlop Pneumatic Tyre Company, for which it was known as the Dunlop Oriel House.

During the Irish Civil War, under Frank Thornton, it became the base for the Criminal Investigations Department (CID) of the Irish Free State - but separate from An Garda Síochána, the national police force.

It was used by the Department of Lands in the late 1940s, and Gaeltarra Eireann had its head office there in the 1950s. It was later purchased by Trinity College Dublin.
