= Óglaigh na hÉireann =

Irish idiom meaning "soldiers of Ireland" or "volunteers of Ireland"

Óglaigh na hÉireann (Irish pronunciation: [ˈoːɡl̪ˠiː n̪ˠə ˈheːɾʲən̪ˠ]), abbreviated ÓÉ, is an Irish-language idiom that can be translated variously as soldiers of Ireland, warriors of Ireland, volunteers of Ireland or Irish volunteers. In traditional Gaelic script, it is written Óglaıġ na hÉıreann.

== Irish Volunteers/Irish Republican Army ==
Óglach, the singular of óglaigh, comes from the Old Irish word óclach, meaning a young man or (by analogy) a young warrior. The phrase Óglaigh na hÉireann was coined as an Irish-language name for the Irish Volunteers of 1913, and it was retained despite the Volunteers becoming known in English as the Irish Republican Army (IRA) during the War of Independence of 1919–1922.

The name has also been used by several other paramilitary groups calling themselves the "Irish Republican Army" since 1920. These groups each claim to be the sole legitimist modern successors to the original Irish Volunteers and Irish Republican Army, and they have refused to recognise the authority of (variously) the Defence Forces, Northern Ireland and the Republic of Ireland; as such, each of these groups claims the sole right to use the name Óglaigh na hÉireann. Such groups have included the Provisional IRA, the Continuity IRA and the Real IRA.

Some IRA splinter groups have used Óglaigh na hÉireann in English-language contexts, abandoning the label Irish Republican Army. An early instance was formed in 1956 by members of the Dublin Brigade who followed Joe Christle after his expulsion from the IRA; they formed an alliance with Saor Uladh shortly before the IRA Border Campaign eclipsed them. Two dissident republican groups formed in the 2000s were named Óglaigh na hÉireann: a Continuity IRA splinter group first reported on by the Independent Monitoring Commission in 2006, and a Real IRA splinter group which began claiming responsibility for attacks in 2009.

A suppression order made by the Irish state in June 1939 under the Offences Against the State Act 1939 stated that "the organisation styling itself the Irish Republican Army (also the I.R.A. and Oglaigh [sic] na hÉireann)" was to be considered an unlawful organisation within the context of the act.

== National Army ==
In 1922, the Anglo-Irish Treaty created the Irish Free State, and its Provisional Government formed the National Army. To establish itself as carrying on the tradition of the pre-independence movement, the Army adopted Óglaigh na hÉireann as its Irish language name, and also adopted the cap badge and buttons of the Irish Volunteers; the badge incorporates the title in its design.

== Defence Forces ==
Since 1924, Óglaigh na hÉireann has remained the official Irish-language title for the Defence Forces, which are recognised by the Irish Government as the only legitimate armed forces of the Republic of Ireland.

It is a criminal offense to use the term Óglaigh na hÉireann "except where such use is authorised by law" since the Defence (Amendment) Act 2024 was passed.
