= Tom Cullen (Irish republican) =

Irish republican (1891–1926)

- Born: c.1891
- Died: 20 June 1926
- Occupation: Active in the Irish revolutionary period

Tom Cullen (c.1891 - 20 June 1926) was an Irish republican active in the Irish revolutionary period.

== Biography ==
During the Irish War of Independence he was one of those who worked very closely with Michael Collins and was known as one of his "best intelligence men." He was assistant director of intelligence (also known as 2nd deputy director of intelligence) which meant he was third-highest ranked in the intelligence department of the IRA. He was also the quartermaster general.

On the same day as the Bloody Sunday (1920) massacre he was one of the gunman involved in the shooting of 18 suspected members of the Cairo gang.

According to Irish Historian Tim Pat Coogan, Cullen and two other intelligencers broke the Dublin Castle spy system.

He sided with the Pro-Treaty forces during the Irish Civil War and joined the Irish National Army, rising to the rank of Major-General.

When the Irish Republican Army Organisation (IRAO) was founded, Cullen was elected organiser.

During Collins’ funeral he led the procession carrying his coffin to Glasnevin Cemetery.

== Death ==
He died from asphyxia due to accidental drowning (according to his death certificate), on 20 June 1926 and was buried in Rathnew cemetery. Up until the mid 1960s, veterans from Dublin and Wicklow held an annual commemoration in his honor.

== Bibliography ==
- 'Fear Not the Storm: The Story of Tom Cullen, an Irish Revolutionary by Cathal Liam'
