= Irish Republican Army (1919–1922) =

Irish paramilitary organisation

- Óglaigh na hÉireann
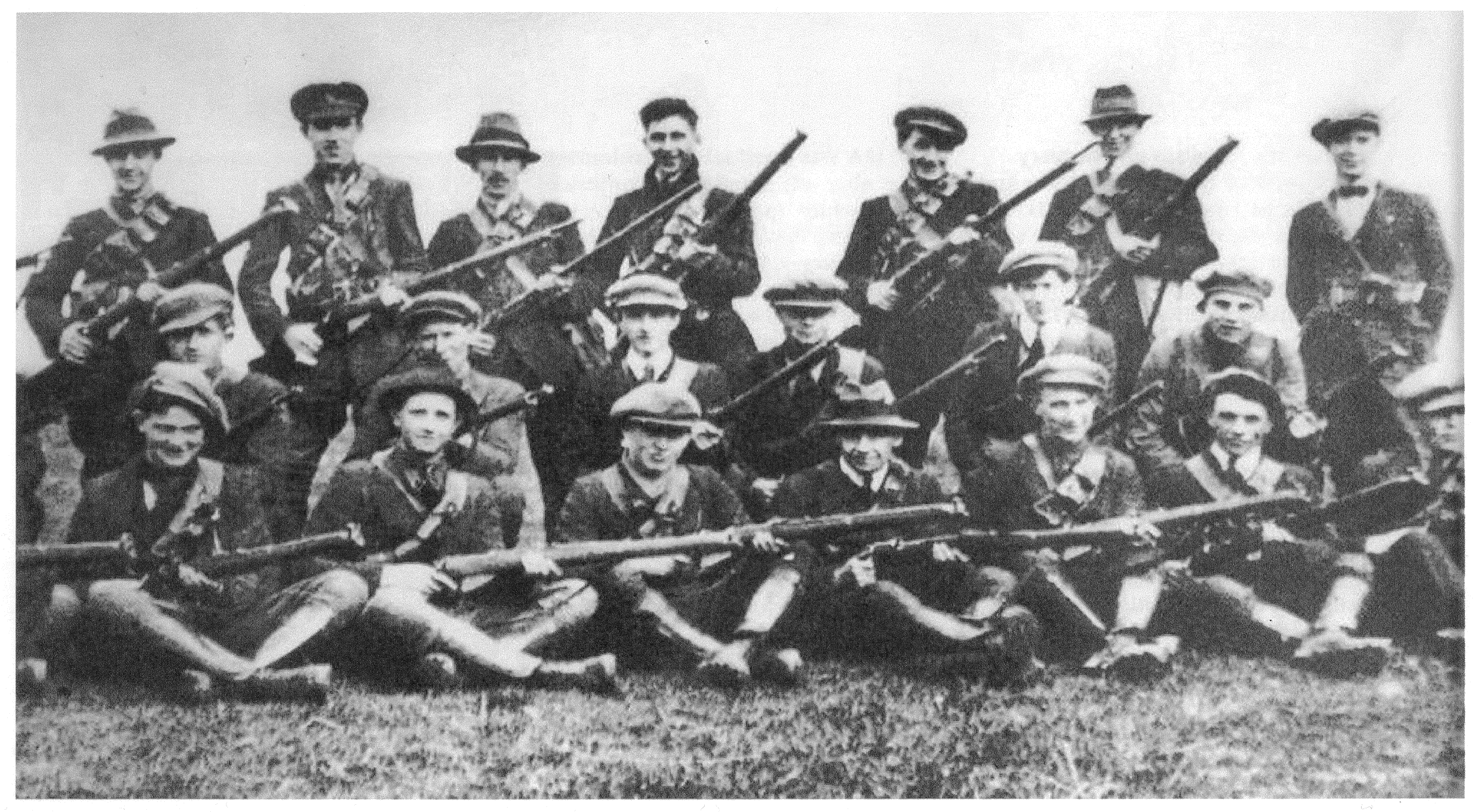
- The Seán Hogan flying column during the War of Independence
- Leader: IRA National Executive
- Dates active: 1919–1922
- Allegiance: Irish Republic
- Headquarters: Dublin
- Active regions: Ireland
- Ideology: Irish republicanism
- Size: c. 100,000 enrolled by 1918 c. 15,000 active personnel 3,000 fighters
- Wars: Irish War of Independence

The Irish Republican Army (IRA; Irish: Óglaigh na hÉireann) was an Irish republican revolutionary paramilitary organisation who waged a guerrilla campaign against the British occupation of Ireland in the 1919–1921 Irish War of Independence. It was descended from the Irish Volunteers, an organisation established on 25 November 1913 that staged the Easter Rising in April 1916. In 1919, the Irish Republic that had been proclaimed during the Easter Rising was formally established by an elected assembly (Dáil Éireann), and the Irish Volunteers were recognised by Dáil Éireann as its legitimate army.

Following the signing in 1921 of the Anglo-Irish Treaty, which ended the War of Independence, a split occurred within the IRA. Members who supported the treaty formed the nucleus of the Irish National Army. However, most of the IRA was opposed to the treaty. The anti-treaty IRA fought a civil war against the Free State Army in 1922–1923, with the intention of creating a fully independent all-Ireland republic. Having lost the civil war, this group remained in existence, with the intention of overthrowing the governments of both the Irish Free State and Northern Ireland and achieving the Irish Republic proclaimed in 1916.

This organisation was the ancestor of many groups also known as the Irish Republican Army, and distinguished from them as the Old IRA.

== Origins ==
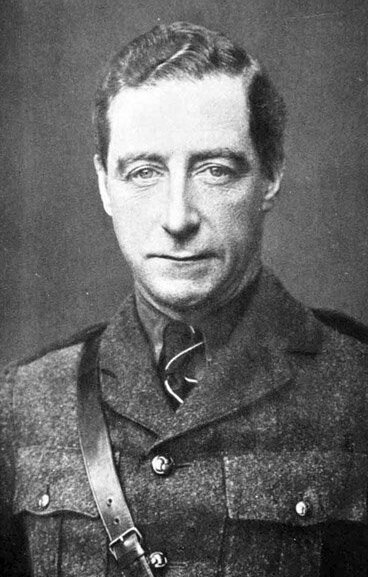
Cathal Brugha, titular commander of the IRA

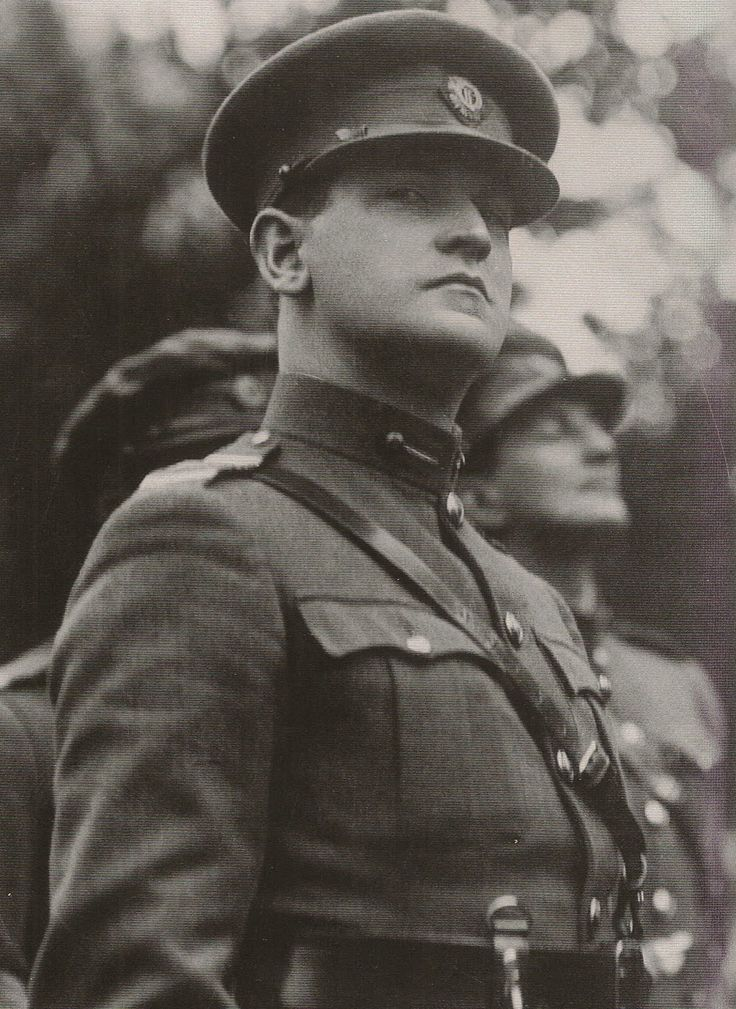
Michael Collins, de facto leader

The Irish Volunteers, founded in 1913, staged the Easter Rising, which aimed at ending British rule in Ireland, in 1916. Following the suppression of the Rising, thousands of Volunteers were imprisoned or interned, leading to the break-up of the organisation. It was reorganised in 1917 following the release of first the internees and then the prisoners. At the army convention held in Dublin in October 1917, Éamon de Valera was elected president, Michael Collins Director for Organisation and Cathal Brugha Chairman of the Resident Executive.

Following the success of Sinn Féin in the 1918 general election and the setting up of the First Dáil (the legislature of the Irish Republic), Volunteers commenced military action against the Royal Irish Constabulary (RIC), the paramilitary police force in Ireland, and subsequently against the British Army. It began with the Soloheadbeg Ambush, when members of the Third Tipperary Brigade led by Séumas Robinson, Seán Treacy, Dan Breen and Seán Hogan, seized a quantity of gelignite, killing two RIC constables in the process.

The Dáil leadership worried that the Volunteers would not accept its authority, given that, under their own constitution, they were bound to obey their own executive and no other body. In August 1919, Brugha proposed to the Dáil that the Volunteers be asked to swear allegiance to the Dáil, but one commentator states that another year passed before the movement took an oath of allegiance to the Irish Republic and its government in "August 1920". In sharp contrast, a contemporary in the struggle for Irish independence notes that by late 1919, the term "Irish Republican Army (IRA)" was replacing "Volunteers" in everyday usage. This change is attributed to the Volunteers, having accepted the authority of the Dáil, being referred to as the "army of the Irish Republic", popularly known as the "Irish Republican Army". Already in September 1917, a group of men from counties Clare and Tipperary charged with illegal drilling were claiming to be soldiers of the "Irish Republican Army". They refused to recognise the legitimacy of the court and insisted they be treated as prisoners of war.

A power struggle continued between Brugha and Collins, both cabinet ministers, over who had the greater influence. Brugha was nominally the superior as Minister for Defence, but Collins's power base came from his position as Director of Organisation of the IRA and from his membership on the Supreme Council of the Irish Republican Brotherhood (IRB). De Valera resented Collins's clear power and influence, which he saw as coming more from the secretive IRB than from his position as a Teachta Dála (TD) and minister in the Aireacht. Brugha and de Valera both urged the IRA to undertake larger, more conventional military actions for the propaganda effect but were ignored by Collins and Mulcahy. Brugha at one stage proposed the assassination of the entire British cabinet. This was also discounted due to its presumed negative effect on British public opinion. Moreover, many members of the Dáil, notably Arthur Griffith, did not approve of IRA violence and would have preferred a campaign of passive resistance to the British rule. The Dáil belatedly accepted responsibility for IRA actions in April 1921, just three months before the end of the Irish War of Independence.

In practice, the IRA was commanded by Collins, with Richard Mulcahy as second in command. These men were able to issue orders and directives to IRA guerrilla units around the country and at times to send arms and organisers to specific areas. However, because of the localised and irregular character of the war, they were only able to exert limited control over local IRA commanders such as Tom Barry, Liam Lynch in Cork and Seán Mac Eoin in Longford.

The IRA claimed a total strength of 70,000, but only about 3,000 were actively engaged in fighting against the Crown. The IRA distrusted those Irishmen who had fought in the British Army during the First World War as potential informers, but there were a number of exceptions such as Emmet Dalton, Tom Barry and Martin Doyle. The IRA divided its members into three classes, namely "unreliable", "reliable" and "active". The "unreliable" members were those who were nominally IRA members but did not do very much for the struggle, "reliable" members played a supporting role in the war while occasionally fighting and the "active" men those who were engaged in full-time fighting. Of the IRA brigades only about one to two-thirds were considered to be "reliable" while those considered "active" were even smaller. A disproportionate number of the "active" IRA men were teachers, medical students, shoemakers and bootmakers; those engaged in building trades like painters, carpenters and bricklayers; draper's assistants and creamery workers. The Canadian historian Peter Hart wrote "...the guerrillas were disproportionately skilled, trained and urban". Farmers and fishermen tended to be underrepresented in the IRA. Those Irishmen engaged in white-collar trades or working as skilled labourers were much more likely to be involved in cultural nationalist groups like the Gaelic League than farmers or fishermen and thus to have a stronger sense of Irish nationalism. Furthermore, the authority of the Crown tended to be stronger in towns and cities than in the countryside. Thus, those engaged in Irish nationalist activities in urban areas were much more likely to come into conflict with the Crown, leading to a greater chance of radicalisation. Finally, the British tactic of blowing up the homes of IRA members had the effect of discouraging many farmers from joining the struggle as the destruction of the family farm could easily reduce a farmer and his family to destitution. Of the "active" IRA members, three-quarters were in their late teens or early 20s and only 5% of the "active" men were in the age range of 40 or older. The "active" members were overwhelmingly single men with only 4% being married or engaged in a relationship. The life of an "active" IRA man with the stress of living on the run and constantly being in hiding tended to attract single men who could adjust to this lifestyle far more easily than a man in a relationship. Furthermore, the IRA preferred to recruit single men as it was found that singles could devote themselves more wholeheartedly to the struggle.

Women were active in the republican movement, but almost no women fought with the IRA whose "active" members were almost entirely male. The IRA was not a sectarian group and went out of its way to proclaim it was open to all Irishmen, but its membership was largely Catholic with virtually no Protestants serving as "active" IRA men. Hart wrote that in his study of the IRA membership that he found only three Protestants serving as "active" IRA men between 1919 and 1921. Of the 917 IRA men convicted by British courts under the Defence of the Realm Act in 1919, only one was a Protestant. The majority of those serving in the IRA were practising Catholics, but there was a large minority of "pagans" as atheists or non-practising Catholics who were known in Ireland. The majority of the IRA men serving in metropolitan Britain were permanent residents with very few sent over from Ireland. The majority of the IRA men operating in Britain were Irish-born, but there was a substantial minority who were British-born, something that made them especially insistent on asserting their Irish identity.

== Irish War of Independence ==
=== IRA campaign and organisation ===
The IRA fought a guerrilla war against the Crown forces in Ireland from 1919 to July 1921. The most intense period of the war was from November 1920 onwards. The IRA campaign can broadly be split into three phases. The first, in 1919, involved the re-organisation of the Irish Volunteers as a guerrilla army and only sporadic attacks. Organisers such as Ernie O'Malley were sent around the country to set up viable guerrilla units. On paper, there were 100,000 or so Volunteers enrolled after the conscription crisis of 1918. However, only about 15,000 of these participated in the guerrilla war. In 1919, Collins, the IRA's Director of Intelligence, organised the "Squad"—an assassination unit based in Dublin that killed police involved in intelligence work (the Irish playwright Brendan Behan's father Stephen Behan was a member of the Squad). Typical of Collins's sardonic sense of humour, the Squad was often referred to as his "Twelve Apostles". In addition, there were some arms raids on RIC barracks. By the end of 1919, four Dublin Metropolitan Police and 11 RIC men had been killed. The RIC abandoned most of their smaller rural barracks in late 1919. Around 400 of these were burned in a co-ordinated IRA operation around the country in April 1920.

The second phase of the IRA campaign, roughly from January to July 1920, involved attacks on the fortified police barracks located in the towns. Between January and June 1920, 16 of these were destroyed and 29 badly damaged. Several events of late 1920 greatly escalated the conflict. Firstly, the British declared martial law in parts of the country—allowing for internment and executions of IRA men. Secondly, they deployed paramilitary forces, the Black and Tans and Auxiliary Division, and more British Army personnel into the country. Thus, the third phase of the war (roughly August 1920 – July 1921) involved the IRA taking on a greatly expanded British force, moving away from attacking well-defended barracks and instead using ambush tactics in the countryside. To this end, primarily at the suggestion of Dan Breen, the IRA was reorganised into "flying columns" – permanent full-time mobile guerrilla units, usually about 20 strong, although sometimes larger; columns could strike at different targets many miles apart in a short period of time. In some areas, the flying columns usually had underground dug-outs where men could sleep and weapons be stored.

The most high-profile violence of the war took place in Dublin in November 1920 and is still known as Bloody Sunday. In the early hours of the morning, Collins' "Squad" killed 14 British spies. In reprisal, that afternoon, British forces opened fire on a football crowd at Croke Park, killing 14 civilians. Towards the end of the day, two prominent republicans and another man who had been arrested the previous day were killed by Crown forces.

While most areas of the country saw some violence in 1919–1921, the brunt of the war was fought in Dublin and the southern province of Munster. In Munster, the IRA carried out a significant number of successful actions against British troops, for instance, the ambushing and killing of 16 of 18 Auxiliaries by Tom Barry's column at Kilmicheal in West Cork in November 1920, or Liam Lynch's men killing 13 British soldiers near Millstreet early in the next year. At the Crossbarry Ambush in March 1921, 100 or so of Barry's men fought a sizeable engagement with a British column of 1,200, escaping from the British encircling manoeuvre. In Dublin, the "Squad" and elements of the IRA Dublin Brigade were amalgamated into the "Active Service Unit", under Oscar Traynor, which tried to carry out at least three attacks on British troops a day. Usually, these consisted of shooting or grenade attacks on British patrols. Outside Dublin and Munster, there were only isolated areas of intense activity. For instance, the County Longford IRA under Seán Mac Eoin carried out a number of well-planned ambushes and successfully defended the village of Ballinalee against Black and Tan reprisals in a three-hour gun battle. In County Mayo, large-scale guerrilla action did not break out until spring 1921, when two British forces were ambushed at Carrowkennedy and Tourmakeady. Elsewhere, fighting was more sporadic and less intense.

In Belfast, the war had a character all of its own. The city had a Protestant and unionist majority and IRA actions were responded to with reprisals against the Catholic population, including killings (such as the McMahon killings and the Arnon Street killings) the burning of many homes – as on Belfast's Bloody Sunday. The IRA in Belfast and the North generally, although involved in protecting the Catholic community from loyalists and state forces, undertook a retaliatory arson campaign against factories and commercial premises. On 22 May 1922 the new Northern Ireland government introduced internment (imprisonment without trial). Over 500 men from Tyrone, Derry, Fermanagh, Armagh and Belfast were arrested (all of the internees were republicans). The violence in Belfast alone, which continued until October 1922 (long after the truce in the rest of the country), claimed the lives of between 400 and 500 people. (see The Troubles in Ulster (1920–1922))

In April 1921, the IRA was again reorganised, in line with the Dáil's endorsement of its actions, along the lines of a regular army. Divisions were created based on region, with commanders being given responsibility, in theory, for large geographical areas. In practice, this had little effect on the localised nature of the guerrilla warfare.

In May 1921, the IRA in Dublin attacked and burned the Custom House. The action was a serious setback as five members were killed and eighty captured.

By the end of the war in July 1921, the IRA was hard-pressed by the deployment of more British troops into the most active areas and a chronic shortage of arms and ammunition. It has been estimated that the IRA had only about 3,000 rifles (mostly captured from the British) during the war, with a larger number of shotguns and pistols. An ambitious plan to buy arms from Italy in 1921 collapsed when the money did not reach the arms dealers. Towards the end of the war, some Thompson submachine guns were imported from the United States; however 495 of these were intercepted by the American authorities and the remainder only reached Ireland shortly before the Truce.

By June 1921, Collins' assessment was that the IRA was within weeks, possibly even days, of collapse. It had few weapons or ammunition left. Moreover, almost 5,000 IRA men had been imprisoned or interned and over 500 killed. Collins and Mulcahy estimated that the number of effective guerrilla fighters was down to 2,000–3,000. However, in the summer of 1921, the war was abruptly ended.

The British recruited hundreds of World War I veterans into the RIC and sent them to Ireland. Because there was initially a shortage of RIC uniforms, the veterans at first wore a combination of dark green RIC uniforms and khaki British Army uniforms, which inspired the nickname "Black and Tans". The brutality of the Black and Tans is now well-known, although the greatest violence attributed to the Crown's forces was often that of the Auxiliary Division of the Constabulary. One of the strongest critics of the Black and Tans was King George V who in May 1921 told Lady Margery Greenwood that "he hated the idea of the Black and Tans."

The IRA was also involved in the destruction of many stately homes in Munster. The Church of Ireland Gazette recorded numerous instances of Unionists and Loyalists being shot, burnt or forced from their homes during the early 1920s. In County Cork between 1920 and 1923 the IRA shot over 200 civilians of whom over 70 (or 36%) were Protestants: five times the percentage of Protestants in the civilian population. This was due to the historical inclination of Protestants towards loyalty to the United Kingdom. A convention of Irish Protestant Churches in Dublin in May 1922 signed a resolution placing "on record" that "hostility to Protestants by reason of their religion has been almost, if not wholly, unknown in the twenty-six counties in which Protestants are in the minority."

Many historic buildings in Ireland were destroyed during the war, notably the Custom House, Dublin, which was disastrously attacked on de Valera's insistence, to the horror of the more militarily experienced Collins. As he feared, the destruction proved a pyrrhic victory for the Republic, with so many IRA men killed or captured that the IRA in Dublin suffered a severe blow.

This was also a period of social upheaval in Ireland, with frequent strikes as well as other manifestations of class conflict. In this regard, the IRA acted to a large degree as an agent of social control and stability, driven by the need to preserve cross-class unity in the national struggle, and on occasion being used to break strikes.

Assessments of the effectiveness of the IRA's campaign vary. They were never in a position to engage in conventional warfare. The political, military and financial costs of remaining in Ireland were higher than the British government was prepared to pay and this in a sense forced them into negotiations with the Irish political leaders. According to historian Michael Hopkinson, the guerrilla warfare "was often courageous and effective". It has been observed: "The guerrilla fighters ... were vastly outnumbered by the forces of the Crown ... The success of the Irish Volunteers in surviving so long is therefore noteworthy."

== Truce and treaty ==
David Lloyd George, the British Prime Minister, found himself under increasing pressure (both internationally and from within the British Isles) to try to salvage something from the situation. This was a complete reversal on his earlier position. He had consistently referred to the IRA as a "murder gang" up until then. An unexpected olive branch came from King George V, who, in a speech in Belfast called for reconciliation on all sides, changed the mood and enabled the British and Irish Republican governments to agree to a truce. The Truce was agreed on 11 July 1921. On 8 July, de Valera met General Nevil Macready, the British commander in chief in Ireland and agreed terms. The IRA was to retain its arms and the British Army was to remain in barracks for the duration of peace negotiations. Many IRA officers interpreted the truce only as a temporary break in fighting. They continued to recruit and train volunteers, with the result that the IRA had increased its number to over 72,000 men by early 1922.

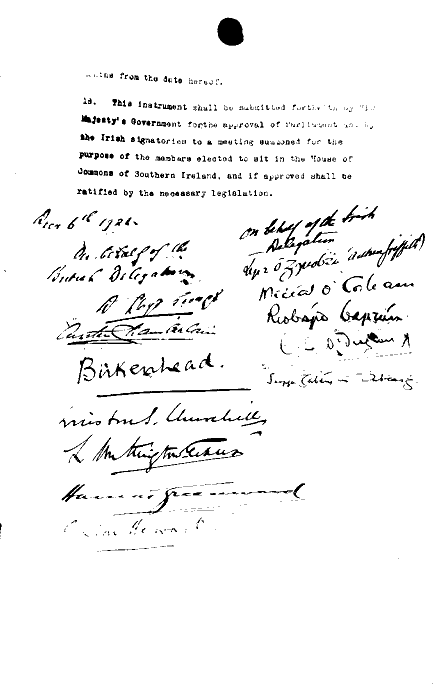
The signed last page of the Anglo-Irish Treaty.

Negotiations on an Anglo-Irish Treaty took place in late 1921 in London. The Irish delegation was led by Arthur Griffith and Michael Collins.

The most contentious areas of the Treaty for the IRA were abolition of the Irish Republic declared in 1919, the status of the Irish Free State as a dominion in the British Commonwealth and the British retention of the so-called Treaty Ports on Ireland's south coast. These issues were the cause of a split in the IRA and ultimately, the Irish Civil War.

Under the Government of Ireland Act 1920, Ireland was partitioned, creating Northern Ireland and Southern Ireland. Under the terms of the Anglo-Irish agreement of 6 December 1921, which ended the war (1919–21), Northern Ireland was given the option of withdrawing from the new Irish Free State or remaining part of the United Kingdom. After the Northern Ireland parliament chose to do the latter an Irish Boundary Commission was then set up to review the border.

Irish leaders expected that it would so reduce Northern Ireland's size, by transferring nationalist areas to the Irish Free State, as to make it economically unviable. Partition was not by itself the key breaking point between pro- and anti-Treaty campaigners; both sides expected the Boundary Commission to greatly reduce Northern Ireland. Moreover, Michael Collins was planning a clandestine guerrilla campaign against the Northern state using the IRA. In early 1922, he sent IRA units to the border areas and sent arms to northern units. It was only afterwards, when partition was confirmed, that a united Ireland became the preserve of anti-Treaty Republicans.

== IRA and the Anglo-Irish Treaty ==
The IRA leadership was deeply divided over the decision by the Dáil to ratify the Treaty. Despite the fact that Michael Collins – the de facto leader of the IRA – had negotiated the Treaty, many IRA officers were against it. Of the General Headquarters (GHQ) staff, nine members were in favour of the Treaty while four opposed it. The majority of the IRA rank-and-file were against the Treaty; in January–June 1922, their discontent developed into open defiance of the elected civilian Provisional government of Ireland.

Both sides agreed that the IRA's allegiance was to the (elected) Dáil of the Irish Republic, but the anti-Treaty side argued that the decision of the Dáil to accept the Treaty (and set aside the Irish Republic) meant that the IRA no longer owed that body its allegiance. They called for the IRA to withdraw from the authority of the Dáil and to entrust the IRA Executive with control over the army. On 16 January, the first IRA division – the 2nd Southern Division led by Ernie O'Malley – repudiated the authority of the GHQ. A month later, on 18 February, Liam Forde, O/C of the IRA Mid-Limerick Brigade, issued a proclamation stating that: "We no longer recognise the authority of the present head of the army, and renew our allegiance to the existing Irish Republic". This was the first unit of the IRA to break with the pro-Treaty government.

On 22 March, Rory O'Connor held what was to become an infamous press conference and declared that the IRA would no longer obey the Dáil as (he said) it had violated its Oath to uphold the Irish Republic. He went on to say that "we repudiate the Dáil ... We will set up an Executive which will issue orders to the IRA all over the country." In reply to the question on whether this meant they intended to create a military dictatorship, O'Connor said: "You can take it that way if you like."

On 28 March, the (anti-Treaty) IRA Executive issued statement stating that Minister of Defence (Richard Mulcahy) and the Chief-of-Staff (Eoin O'Duffy) no longer exercised any control over the IRA. In addition, it ordered an end to the recruitment to the new military and police forces of the Provisional Government. Furthermore, it instructed all IRA units to reaffirm their allegiance to the Irish Republic on 2 April. The stage was set for civil war over the Treaty.

== Civil War ==
The pro-treaty IRA soon became the nucleus of the new (regular) Irish National Army created by Collins and Richard Mulcahy. British pressure, and tensions between the pro- and anti-Treaty factions of the IRA, led to a bloody civil war ending in the defeat of the anti-Treaty side. On 24 May 1923, Frank Aiken, the (anti-treaty) IRA chief of staff, called a ceasefire. Many left political activity altogether, but a minority continued to insist that the new Irish Free State, created by the "illegitimate" Treaty, was an illegitimate state. They asserted that their "IRA Army Executive" was the real government of a still-existing Irish Republic. The IRA of the civil war and subsequent organisations that have used the name claim lineage from that group, which is covered in full at Irish Republican Army (1922–1969).

For information on later organisations using the name Irish Republican Army, see the table below. For a genealogy of organisations using the name IRA after 1922, see List of organisations known as the Irish Republican Army.

== See also ==
- List of films featuring the Irish Republican Army

== Bibliography ==
- Bartlett, Thomas; Jefferey, Keith, eds. (1997). A Military History of Ireland. Cambridge University Press. ISBN 9780521629898.
- Cottrell, Peter (2006). The Anglo-Irish War The Troubles of 1913-1922. Osprey.
- Durney, James (2004). The Volunteer: Uniforms, Weapons and History of the Irish Republican Army 1913-1997. Gaul House. ISBN 9780954918071.
- Hart, Peter (March 1999). "The Social Structure of the Irish Republican Army, 1916–1923". The Historical Journal. 42 (1): 207–231. doi:10.1017/S0018246X98008176. S2CID 159829143.
- Hopkinson, Michael (1999). The Last Days of Dublin Castle: The Diaries of Mark Sturgis. Dublin: Irish Academic Press. ISBN 978-0716526261.
- Hopkinson, Michael (2002). The Irish War of Independence. Montreal; Ithaca: McGill-Queen's University Press. ISBN 9780773524989.
- Macardle, Dorothy (1968). The Irish Republic. Corgi. ISBN 055207862X.
- Milotte, Mike (1984). Communism in modern Ireland: the pursuit of the workers' republic since 1916. Gill and Macmillan. ISBN 9780841909700.
- Parkinson, Alan F. (2004). Belfast's Unholy War: The Troubles of the 1920s. Dublin: Four Courts Press. ISBN 9781851827923.
- Patterson, Henry (1989). The Politics of Illusion: Republicanism and Socialism in Modern Ireland. Hutchinson Radius. ISBN 0-09-174139-4.
- Younger, Calton (1968). Ireland's Civil War. Frederick Muller. ISBN 978-0584101379.
