= The Squad (Irish Republican Army unit) =

Irish Republican Army unit during the Irish War of Independence

The Squad, nicknamed the Twelve Apostles, was an Irish Republican Army (IRA) unit founded by Michael Collins to counter British intelligence efforts during the Irish War of Independence, mainly by means of assassination. The Squad engaged in executing informants, police active in harassment of IRA personnel, and enemy agents, and worked in counterespionage.

== Background ==
On 10 April 1919, the First Dáil announced a policy of ostracism of Royal Irish Constabulary men. At the time Sinn Féin official policy was against acts of violence. Boycotting, persuasion and mild intimidation succeeded against many officers. However others escalated their activities against republicans and in March 1920 Collins asked Dick McKee to select a small group to form an assassination unit.

== Members ==
Liam Tobin at the funeral of Michael Collins in 1922

When the Squad was formed, it came directly under the control of the Director of Intelligence or his deputy and under no other authority. The Squad was commanded by Mick McDonnell.

The original "Twelve Apostles" were Mick McDonnell, Tom Keogh, Paddy McCrea, Jimmy Slattery, Paddy Daly, Joe Leonard, Ben Barrett, Vincent Byrne, Sean Doyle, Paddy Griffin, Eddie Byrne, Mick Reilly and Jimmy Conroy. After some time The Squad was strengthened by the following members: Ben Byrne, Frank Bolster, Mick Keogh, Mick Kennedy, Bill Stapleton and Jeremiah "Sam" Robinson. Owen Cullen (a member of 2nd Battalion) was driver for a short time, and Paddy Kelly of County Clare for a short time. They were employed full-time and received a weekly wage.

Sometimes, as occasion demanded, the Squad was strengthened by members of the IRA Intelligence Staff, the Active Service Unit, munition workers and members of the Dublin Brigade, Tipperary Flying Column men, Dan Breen, Séumas Robinson, Seán Treacy and Seán Hogan, and also Mick Brennan and Michael Prendergast of County Clare.

The IRA Intelligence Staff consisted of the Director of Intelligence Michael Collins, the Deputy Director of Intelligence Liam Tobin, the Second Deputy Director of Intelligence Tom Cullen, the Third Director of Intelligence Frank Thornton, and members Joe Dolan, Frank Saurin, Ned Kelleher, Joe Guilfoyle, Paddy Caldwell, Paddy Kennedy, Charlie Dalton, Dan McDonnell and Charlie Byrne. The munitions workers included Mat Furlong, Sean Sullivan, Gay McGrath, Martin O'Kelly, Tom Younge and Chris Reilly.

Other members included Mick Love, Gearoid O'Sullivan, Patrick Caldwell, Charlie Dalton, Mick O'Reilly, Vincent Byrne, Sean Healy, James Ronan, Tom Keogh, Tom Cullen, Paddy Lawson, John Dunne and Johnny Wilson, James Heery. Seán Lemass and Stephen Behan (the father of Irish writers Brendan and Dominic Behan) have also been listed as members of the Apostles. There is no hard evidence to support the inclusion of many of the names, but those who subsequently served in the Irish Army have their active service recorded in their service records held in the Military Archives Department in Cathal Brugha Barracks, Rathmines.

Andy Cooney is reported to have been associated with the Squad. Stephen Behan's involvement was first made public in 1962, when the BBC broadcast an episode of This Is Your Life dedicated to Behan. During the broadcast, remaining members of the Squad joined Behan on the set of the show.

== Assassinations ==
On 30 July 1919, the first assassination authorised by Michael Collins was carried out, when Detective Sergeant "the Dog" Smith was shot near Drumcondra, Dublin. The Squad continued to target plainclothes police, members of the G Division of the Dublin Metropolitan Police, and—occasionally—problematic civil servants. Organisationally it operated as a subsection of Collins's Intelligence Headquarters. Two of the executions by the Squad were the killing on 21 January 1920 of RIC Inspector William Redmond of the G Division and on 2 March 1920 of a British double agent, John Charles Byrnes.

== Bloody Sunday ==
One of the Apostles' particular targets was the Cairo Gang, a deep-cover British intelligence group, so called since it had either been largely assembled from intelligence officers serving in Cairo or from the Dublin restaurant called the Cairo, which the gang frequented. Sir Henry Wilson brought in the Cairo Gang in the middle of 1920 explicitly to deal with Michael Collins and his organisation. Given carte blanche in its operations by Wilson, the Cairo Gang adopted the strategy of assassinating members of Sinn Féin unconnected with the military struggle, assuming that this would cause the IRA to respond and bring its leaders into the open.

The best-known operation executed by the Apostles occurred on what became known as Bloody Sunday, 21 November 1920, when British MI5 officers, linked to the Cairo Gang and significantly involved in spying, were shot at locations in Dublin. 14 were killed, six were wounded. In addition to the "Twelve Apostles", a larger number of IRA personnel were involved in this operation. The only IRA man captured during the operation was Frank Teeling.

In response to the killings, the Auxiliaries retaliated by shooting up a Gaelic football match between Dublin and Tipperary at Croke Park, the proceeds from which were for the Irish Republican Prisoners Fund. 14 civilians were killed, including one of the players, Michael Hogan. 68 people were wounded. The Hogan stand at Croke Park is named after him.

The elimination of the Cairo Gang was seen in Dublin as an intelligence victory. British Prime Minister David Lloyd George commented dismissively that his men "... got what they deserved, beaten by counter-jumpers...". Winston Churchill, Secretary of State for War and Air in Lloyd George's cabinet, added that they were ".. careless fellows ... who ought to have taken precautions".

Some Squad members were hanged in 1921 for the killings on Bloody Sunday, including Thomas Whelan and Patrick Moran.

== Dublin Guard ==
In May 1921, after the IRA's Dublin Brigade took heavy casualties during the burning of the Custom House, the Squad and the Brigade's "Active Service Unit" were amalgamated into the Dublin Guard, under Paddy Daly. Under the influence of Daly and Michael Collins, most of the Guard took the Free State side and joined the National Army in the Irish Civil War of 1922–23. During this conflict some of them were attached to the Criminal Investigation Department and were accused of multiple assassination of Anti-Treaty fighters. They were also involved in several atrocities against Republican prisoners, particularly after the death of Michael Collins, due to many of them having personal ties with him.

== Later years ==
Bill Stapleton became a director of Bord na Móna. Charles Dalton and Frank Saurin became directors of the Irish Hospitals' Sweepstake. Dalton was the subject of an article by Kevin Myers. Myers questioned Dalton living in Morehampton Road in 1940, but did not research his article enough to mention that Dalton was a director of the Sweepstakes at the time. In October 1923, Commandant James Conroy was implicated in the murder of two Jewish men, Bernard Goldberg and Emmanuel 'Ernest' Kah[a]n. He avoided arrest by fleeing to Mexico, returning later to join the Blueshirts. A later application for an army pension was rejected. The killings were the subject of a 2010 investigative documentary by RTÉ; CSÍ: Murder in Little Jerusalem.

== Bibliography ==
- The Squad and the Intelligence Operations of Michael Collins T. Ryle Dwyer
