= National Army (Ireland) =

Army of the Irish Free State

- An tArm Náisiúnta
- National Army Cap Badge
- Leaders: Michael Collins; Richard Mulcahy
- Dates active: 31 January 1922 – 1 October 1924
- Active regions: Southern Ireland; Irish Free State
- Size: 55,000
- Wars: Irish Civil War

The National Army, sometimes unofficially referred to as the Free State Army or the Regulars, was the army of the Irish Free State from January 1922 until October 1924. Its role in this period was defined by its service in the Irish Civil War, in defence of the institutions established by the Anglo-Irish Treaty. Michael Collins was the army's first commander-in-chief until his death in August 1922.

The army made its first public appearance on 31 January 1922, when command of Beggars Bush Barracks was handed over from the British Army. Its first troops were the Pro-Treaty IRA—those volunteers of the Irish Republican Army (IRA) who supported the Anglo-Irish Treaty and the "Provisional Government of Ireland" formed thereunder. Conflict arose between the National Army and those that opposed the government of the Irish Free State namely the anti-Treaty components of the IRA. On 28 June 1922 the National Army commenced an artillery bombardment of anti-Treaty IRA forces who were occupying the Four Courts in Dublin, thus beginning the Irish Civil War.

The National Army was greatly expanded in size to fight the civil war against the anti-Treaty IRA, in a mostly counter-insurgency campaign that was brought to a successful conclusion in May 1923. From 1 October 1924, the Army was reorganised into a smaller, better regulated force; the term "National Army" was superseded by the legal establishment of the Defence Forces as the Irish Free State's military force.

== History ==
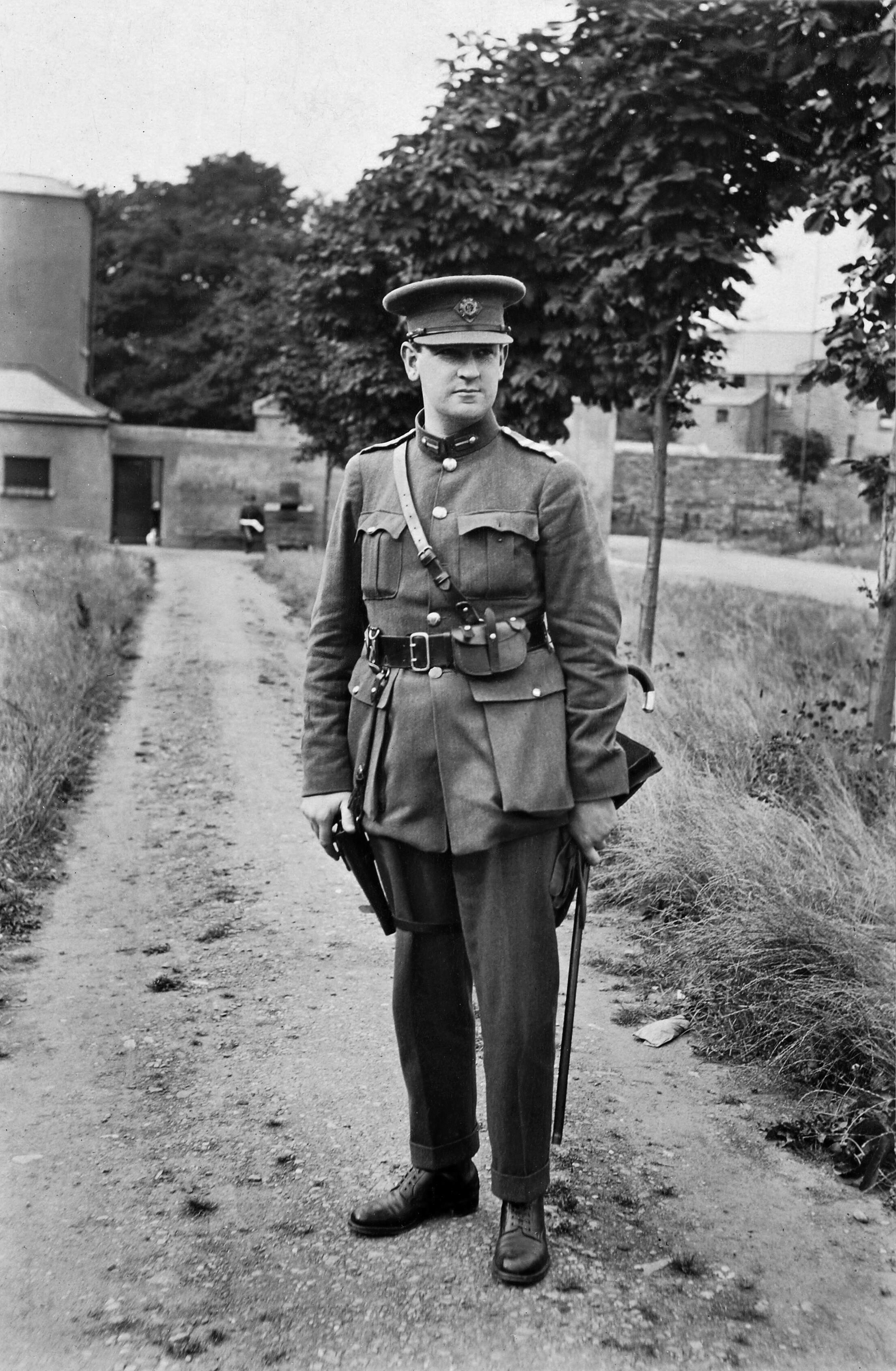
Michael Collins as Commander-in-Chief of the Irish National Forces

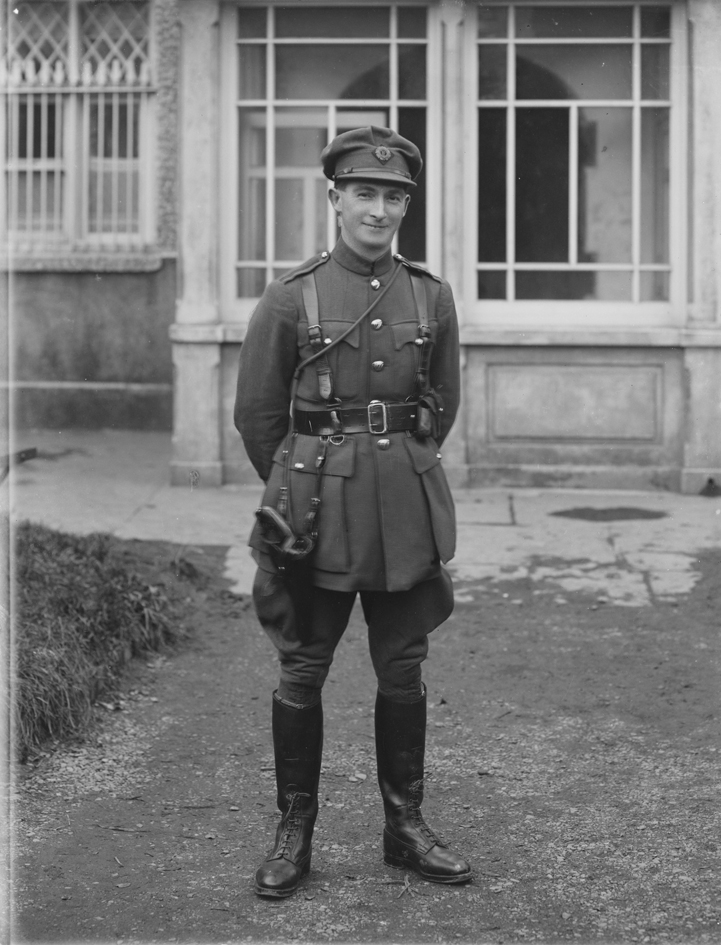
Commdt. Hetherington of the Irish National Army, photographed on 7 November 1922.

The National Army was constituted from the revolutionary Irish Republican Army (IRA), which emerged from the successful Irish War of Independence, fought as a guerrilla campaign against the British Army and Royal Irish Constabulary. On 31 January 1922, the first unit of the new National Army, a former IRA unit of the Dublin Guard, took possession of Beggars Bush Barracks, the first British barracks to be handed to the new state. Michael Collins envisaged the new army being built around the pre-existing IRA, but over half of this organisation rejected the compromises made in the Anglo-Irish Treaty, and favoured upholding the revolutionary Irish Republic that had existed from 1919 until 1921.

In February 1922, the pro-treaty National Army began to recruit volunteers. Until 1924, the National Army had no legal relationship with the Provisional Government and the Army Councils operated in co-operation with the government while remaining a separate and independent entity. Many who supported the treaty in the civil war and joined the pro-treaty forces believed they were fighting for the republic which Collins had promised. Army appointments were made inside the army and not by the Provisional Government or later Free State Governments. Martial Law was initiated by the army on 11 July 1922, did not derive from any act of parliament. A force of 4,000 troops was envisaged, but with the impending Civil War, on 5 July 1922, the Provisional Government authorised raising an establishment of 35,000 men. Many of the new army's recruits were veterans of the British Army in World War I, where they had served in disbanded Irish regiments of the British Army; by May 1923 this had grown to 58,000 troops. The National Army lacked the expertise necessary to train a force of that size, so approximately 20 per cent of its officers and 50 per cent of its soldiers were Irish ex-servicemen of the British Army and men like Martin Doyle, Emmet Dalton, W. R. E. Murphy, and Henry Kelly brought considerable combat experience.

=== The Civil War ===
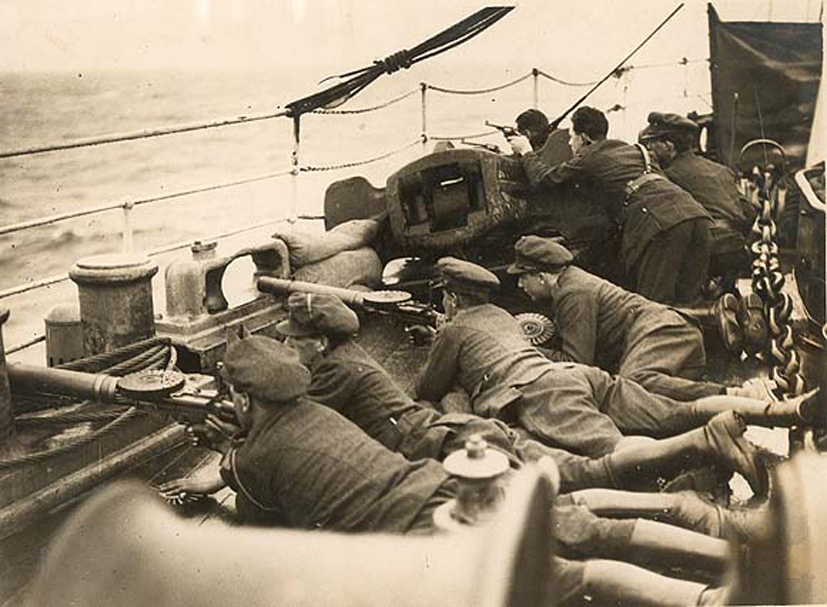
National Army soldiers aboard a ship during the Civil War

In March 1922, there was a major stand-off between up to 700 National Army and anti-treaty IRA in Limerick over who would occupy the military barracks being vacated by departing British troops. The situation was temporarily resolved in April when the two sides agreed to occupy two barracks each. In April 1922 Brigadier-General George Adamson – one of the founders of the National Army – was shot dead by the IRA in Athlone. In early May 1922 there was an even more serious clash in Kilkenny, when the IRA occupied the centre of the town and 200 National Army troops were sent from Dublin to disperse them. 18 people were killed in the fighting in Kilkenny. In a bid to avoid an all-out civil war, both sides agreed to a truce on 3 May 1922.

On 14 April 1922, 200 Anti-Treaty IRA soldiers led by Rory O'Connor occupied the Four Courts and several other buildings in central Dublin. At this time Collins was supplying the anti-treaty IRA with British arms for use in Northern Ireland. On 27 June 1922, the Four Courts IRA garrison kidnapped JJ "Ginger" O'Connell, a general in the National Army following the arrest of IRA volunteer Leo Henderson who was commandeering cars for use in Northern Ireland. After giving the Four Courts garrison a final ultimatum to leave the building, the pro-treaty army decided to end the stand-off by shelling the Four Courts garrison into surrender: at 4.29am on 28 June 1922, 18-pounder guns borrowed from the British army opened fire on the Four Courts. It is sometimes assumed the Provisional Government appointed Michael Collins as Commander-in-Chief of the National Army, but there is no evidence to support this contention. This was the point of no return and is regarded as the beginning of the Irish Civil War. The IRA contingent in the Four Courts, who had only small arms, surrendered after two days of shelling and the buildings were stormed by National Army troops. Fighting continued in Dublin until 5 July 1922, as IRA units from the Dublin Brigade led by Oscar Traynor occupied O'Connell Street, provoking a week's more street fighting. This fighting cost both sides, with 65 killed and 280 wounded in all.

The British supplied artillery, aircraft, armoured cars, machine guns, small arms and ammunition to the National Army. Michael Collins, Richard Mulcahy and Eoin O'Duffy planned a nationwide offensive, sending columns overland to take Limerick and Waterford and seaborne forces to Counties Cork, Kerry and Mayo. The only true conventional battle during the offensive was the Battle of Killmallock. Collins was killed in an ambush by IRA forces at Béal na Bláth in County Cork on 22 August 1922; General Richard Mulcahy then took command.

Some of the National Army's most effective troops were the Dublin Guard, who were to the forefront of the Free state offensive in the summer of 1922. The Guard was formed in June 1921 by an amalgamation of the IRA Squad and Dublin IRA Active Service Unit – both pro-Treaty in sympathy due to their links with Michael Collins. Its officers "formed the cadre of the Dublin Guard". After the onset of civil war, the Guard was rapidly expanded by the recruitment of many more men, including Irish veterans of the British Army. The Guard acted, particularly in County Kerry, which they occupied after a successful assault on Tralee in August 1922, with fearsome brutality, beginning the summary execution of captured IRA soldiers. The most notorious example of this occurred at Ballyseedy where nine IRA prisoners were tied to a landmine; the detonation killed eight and only left one, Stephen Fuller, who was blown clear by the blast to escape.

Frank Aiken, IRA Chief of Staff ordered IRA volunteers to dump arms on 24 May 1923, ending the fighting.

=== Establishment of Defence Forces ===
With the end of the Civil War, the National Army had grown too big for a peacetime role and was too expensive for the new Irish state to maintain. In addition, many of the civil war recruits were badly trained and undisciplined, making them unsuitable material for a full-time professional army. In the autumn of 1923, the government started to reduce the size of the National Army. This entailed a reduction of 30,000 personnel (including 2,200 officers) by March 1924.

On 3 August 1923, the Irish Free State passed the Defence Forces (Temporary Provisions) Act, raising "an armed force to be called Óglaigh na hÉireann (hereinafter referred to as the Forces) consisting of such number of officers, non-commissioned officers, and men as may from time to time be provided by the Oireachtas." The act stated that "The Forces shall be established as from a date to be fixed by Proclamation of the Executive Council in the Iris Oifigiúil". The establishment of the Defence Forces was on 1 October 1924.

This date marks the ending of the initial phase of the National Army and the legal establishment of the Defence Forces as the Irish Free State's military force. However, it was not a new force: the legislation was explicit that the Defence Forces would have the same legality, organisation, personnel, orders and regulations as the 1922–24 force.

The Special Infantry Corps was established during the final stages of the Civil War, to reverse illegal land seizures and break the strikes of agricultural labourers in Munster and south Leinster, as well as reversing factory seizures by striking workers.

In 1924, a small group of officers, led mainly by former members of The Squad, attempted to resist the efforts to demobilise. This situation evolved into what became called the "Army Mutiny", which, after an ultimatum, was resolved relatively peaceably with recognition of the authority of the Irish Free State's Government.

== Organisation ==
The National Army's initial organisation was based on the IRA's system of divisions and brigades. In January 1923, General Routine Orders Numbers 14 and 16 established a new organisation of nine commands and 65 battalions.

The commands and their battalions were:

- Dublin Command: 1st, 8th, 13th, 16th, 20th, 21st, 24th, 33rd, 37th, 45th, 48th, 49th, 50th, 53rd, 55th, 56th, 57th, 58th Infantry Battalions
- Athlone Command: 2nd, 5th, 22nd, 23rd, 51st Infantry Battalions
- Donegal Command: 3rd, 35th, 46th Infantry Battalions
- Claremorris Command: 4th, 26th, 34th, 44th, 52nd Infantry Battalions
- Limerick Command: 7th, 11th, 12th, 18th, 28th, 31st, 39th Infantry Battalions
- Kerry Command: 6th, 9th, 17th, 19th, 27th Infantry Battalions
- Waterford Command: 14th, 25th, 36th, 41st, 47th Infantry Battalions
- Cork Command: 10th, 15th, 30th, 32nd, 38th, 40th, 42nd Infantry Battalions
- Curragh Command: 29th, 43rd, 54th Garrison, and 59th-65th Reserve Battalions

The following corps and services existed in the National Army:

- Armoured Car Corps
- Artillery Corps
- Army Corps of Engineers
- Works Corps
- Railway Protection, Repair and Maintenance Corps
- Salvage Corps
- Army Signal Corps
- Army Medical Corps
- Mechanical Transport Corps
- Military Police Corps
- National Army Air Service
- Army School of Music
- Special Infantry Corps
- Army Pay Corps
- Coastal and Marine Service
- Army School of Instruction
- Army Ordnance Corps

== Uniforms ==
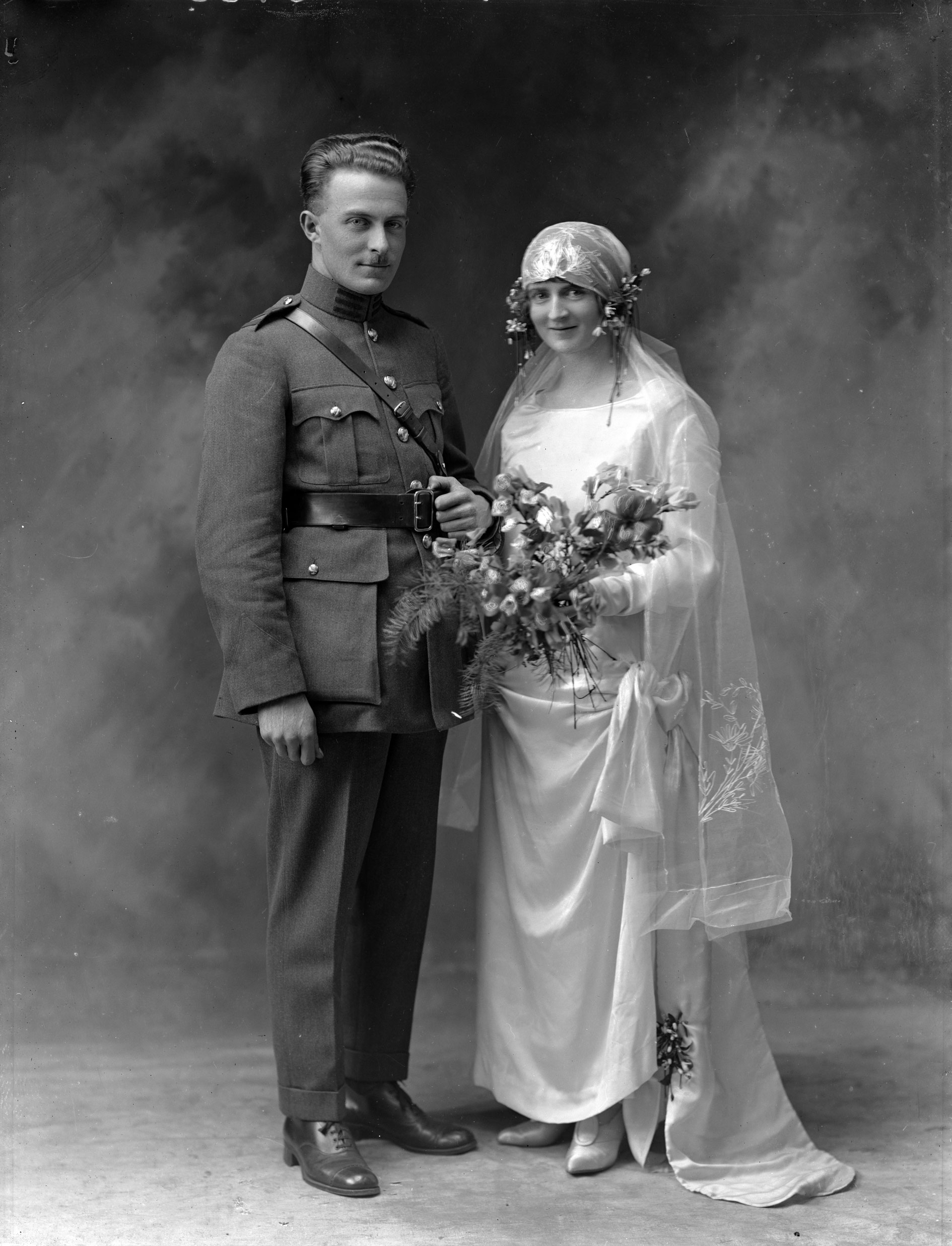
Wedding of Major Michael Joseph Bishop and Patricia Foley, 1924. "Major" Bishop (ranks were not fully standardised in the 1920s) was actually a colonel, as indicated by the three dark bands on his collar.

The National Army officer's uniform was made of dark green serge and worn with a Sam Browne belt. The ordinary volunteer's uniform was a similar pattern, worn with British 1908 pattern webbing. A greatcoat was issued for bad weather. All ranks wore brown boots and leggings. The cap badge and buttons of the Irish Volunteers and the pre-Independence IRA were worn, in recognition of the National Army's origins.

=== Rank markings ===
The initial rank markings were made of cloth and worn on the cuff. Cap badges were worn on a diamond shaped cloth backing, coloured according to rank. Staff officers wore a coloured stripe along the centre of the shoulder straps; battalion - purple; brigade - brown; division - red. General headquarters staff officers wore a bi-coloured cap diamonds; Lieutenant and Captain - blue/yellow; and Lieutenant Commandant to Colonel Commandant - red/yellow.

Rank	Irish	Cuff Bands	Cap Diamonds
Volunteer	Óglach	N/A	N/A
Corporal	Corporál	1 Green	Green
Sergeant	Sáirsint	2 Green	Green
Sergeant Major	Maor-Sháirsint	3 Green	Green
2nd Lieutenant		1 Blue	Blue
Lieutenant	Leas-Captaen	2 Blue	Blue
Captain	Captaen	3 Blue	Blue
Vice Commandant (Battalion)	Leas-Cheann Catha (Cath)	2 Purple	Purple
Lieutenant Commandant (Brigade)	Ceannphort Ionaid (Briogáid)	2 Brown	Brown
Lieutenant Commandant (Division)	Ceannphort Ionaid (Rionne)	2 Red	Red
Commandant (Battalion)	Ceann Catha (Cath)	3 Purple	Purple
Commandant (Brigade)	Ceann Catha (Briogáid)	3 Brown	Brown
Commandant (Division)	Ceann Catha (Rionne)	3 Red	Red
Brigadier	Briogádóir	Narrow Gold between 2 Brown	Brown
Colonel Commandant	Ceannphort	Narrow Gold between 2 Red	Red

General Officers' markings were cloth bands on shoulder strap, collar gorget and cap diamonds.

Rank	Irish	Shoulder Bands	Collar Gorget	Cap Diamonds
Division Commandant General	Taoiseach	1 Gold between 2 Red	Red and Gold	Yellow
GHQ Commandant General	Taoiseach	1 Gold	Yellow	Yellow
GHQ Major General	Maor-Taoiseach	2 Gold one wide, one narrow	Gold and Yellow	Yellow
GHQ Lieutenant General	Ard-Taoiseach Ionaid	2 Gold	Gold and Yellow	Yellow
GHQ General	Ard-Taoiseach	3 Gold	Gold and Yellow	Yellow

On 31 January 1923, the ranks and insignia were re-arranged:

Rank	Bars	Worn
Private	N/A	N/A
Corporal	1 Green	Left Arm
Sergeant	2 Green	Left Arm
Sergeant Major	3 Green	Left Arm
2nd Lieutenant	1 Blue	Shoulder Strap
Lieutenant	2 Blue	Shoulder Strap
Captain	3 Blue	Shoulder Strap
Commandant	2 Red	Shoulder Strap
Colonel	3 Red	Shoulder Strap and Collar
Major General	2 Red with 1 Gold between	Shoulder Strap and Collar
Lieutenant General	2 Gold	Shoulder Strap and Collar
General	3 Gold	Shoulder Strap and Collar

== Armoured fighting vehicles, aircraft, and weapons ==
=== Armoured fighting vehicles ===
- 13 × Rolls-Royce Armoured Car
- 7 × Peerless armoured car
- 64 × Lancia Armoured Car

=== Aircraft ===
- 1 × Martinsyde Type A Mk2
- 6 × Avro 504K
- 1 × S.E.5a
- 8 × Bristol F.2B
- 4 × Martinsyde F4
- 8 × de Havilland DH.9

=== Weapons ===
- Lee–Enfield rifle
- Lewis machine gun
- Thompson submachine gun
- Vickers machine gun
- Hotchkiss machine gun
- 9 × 18-pounder guns (4 Mk Is and 5 Mk IIs)
- Webley Revolver

== See also ==
- Army Comrades Association
