= Campbell Kelly =

Intelligence officer in the British Army

Campbell Joseph O'Connor Kelly, OBE, MC, GM, MM, was an intelligence officer in the British Army who was part of the "Cairo Gang" responsible for torture of prisoners in Cork, was targeted for assassination on 21 November 1920 by the Irish Republican Army as one of the events planned by Michael Collins for Bloody Sunday. Kelly was born in Mayo, and used various versions of his name, he went to England after War of Independence, was dismissed from the British Army in 1928 for fraud, and left his wife and 5 children. He married again bigamously in 1938, got George Medal for heroism in 1941 in the Coventry Blitz, was tried for bigamy and died in 1942. Kelly's medals were scheduled to be sold at auction in New York in January 2016 in a sale devoted to medals of the 1916 Easter Rising and the fight for Irish independence.

Kelly was awarded the George Medal for his actions working in Air Raid Protection in World War II:

Campbell Joseph Kelly, O.B.E., M.C, M.M., Control Officer, Works Air Defence Department, Coventry. Mr. Kelly's organisation and personal bearing have been largely responsible for the building up of a highly efficient Works Air Raid Defence team. His personal activities on the night of an intensive air raid were largely instrumental in saving his factory from destruction. He extinguished an incendiary bomb and immediately afterwards took twelve volunteers to help the City Fire Service deal with a serious fire. After that, they attended at another fire and on the way back helped to extricate the bodies of policemen who were trapped in debris left by high explosive bombs. A large high explosive bomb hit a works shop but fire was avoided by prompt action under Kelly's guidance. Until five o'clock in the morning Kelly continued to give inspiring leadership to his men. There was no cover for any of the working parties and they all carried out what was asked of them with fortitude and courage. Mr. Kelly was ably assisted in this work by David Lloyd, First Officer of the Works Auxiliary Fire Service
