= William Conway (Irish republican) =

Member of the Irish Republican Army

William Conway (1902- 9 June 1976) was born in Ballycrenode, County Tipperary in 1902. He was the son of Timothy and Anastasia Conway and brother to 6 siblings, 5 brothers and 1 sister. William Conway was a member of the Irish Republican Army and among the founders of the Young Ireland Hurling Club.

== Background ==
The son of a farmer, William Conway joined the IRA as a member of the North Tipperary IRA from 1917 to 1919. He came to Dublin and worked as a barman with his brother James near Lower Mount Street where they rented a place. Once in Dublin, he joined the branch of G Company 3rd Battalion of the Dublin Brigade. While working in Mount Street, he met Sean Hyde who had come into his shop.

== Bloody Sunday (22 Lower Mount Street) ==
On 22 November 1921, his lodgings were raided by the military over the Bloody Sunday murders. The raiding party found pamphlets (illegal) a first aid kit, filed dressings, some maps, and a compass. He was arrested with his brother Jim and taken to the bridewell RIC barracks.

During a police lineup on 1 December, he was identified by Nellie Stapleton, a witness and maid at 22 Lower Mount Street, as being one of the people she saw during the assassination of Lieutenant Angliss. He was charged with murder.

On 15 December 1921 he was taken to Kilmainham Gaol along with three other suspects: Frank Teeling, Edward Potter, and Daniel Healy.

== Kilmainham Gaol escape ==
On the night of 14 February 1921, an escape from Kilmainham Gaol was masterminded by Michael Collins and his command. Frank Teeling, Ernie O'Malley, and Simon Donnelly escaped from the prison on the pretext of a transfer order, and after some guards were bribed. After Frank Teeling escaped, William Conway, who said he was in the cell next door told of the incident in a letter to the pensions board statement, that he took Frank Teeling's overcoat from his cell when he heard that bloodhounds were being brought in to search for the prisoners; Thus removing the scent for the dogs. Following the prisoner escape by Frank Teeling from Kilmainham Jail on 14 February, the Under Secretary James MacMahon hastily arranged, under curfew, for the transfer of 24 high risk prisoners including Conway to Mountjoy Jail during the night of 16 February 1921.

== Lower Mount Street trial ==
The Bloody Sunday trial for the Lower Mount Street murders began on 25 January 1921, and ended on 31 January.

The subsequent trial received a lot of attention throughout Ireland with most Irish newspapers and international newspapers reporting it.

During the trial, William Conway vigorously protested his innocence saying that he was at 9am Sunday mass in Westmoreland Street. One controversial thing came to light with the release of Irish Military archive papers between 2015-2022, when a lawyer for the defence council, Vincent Rice, wrote to the Irish Bureau of Military history back in 1952 stating that a witness had seen Conway with his brother at about 8.50am walking on the way to mass. This statement was not shared by the prosecution at the time.

William Conway was convicted of the murder of Lieutenant Angliss along with Frank Teeling and Edward Potter. Two of the defendants were identified by a witness, a British Army Lieutenant called Mr. "C". The three were given sentences of death by hanging. Daniel Healy was tried separately and was found not guilty.

== Parliamentary pressure ==
A parliamentary question was asked by William Lunn MP in the House of Commons, with regard to doubts about William Conway's (and Edward Potter) conviction for the murder of Lieutenant Angliss. This being due to the two witnesses being of unreliable character. Mr. Lunn asked the Chief Secretary whether William Conway and Edward Potter were convicted of the murder of Lieutenant Angliss on the evidence of two witnesses; whether one of these witnesses was a servant in the house, whose account of the tragedy was excusably confused and contradictory; whether the other witness admitted that he was frequently drunk; whether he had been charged with disorderly conduct and also with assault and obscene language; and whether he had previously identified as having been concerned with the murder of Lieutenant Angliss two men who were subsequently proved to have been in gaol at the time?

A second parliamentary question was asked by John Swan MP to the Chief Secretary of Ireland, Sir Hamar Greenwood, about the 15 witnesses at Conway's trial who were brought forward to prove William Conway's alibi that he was not present during the murder of Lieutenant Angliss on 20 November 1920.

John Swan MP asked the Chief Secretary: whether at the court-martial which convicted Conway and Potter of the murder of Lieutenant Angliss 15 witnesses were brought to prove an alibi for Conway and seven to prove that Potter was in bed at the time?

Sir. Hamar Greenwood (the Chief Secretary of Ireland) stated: The answer is in the affirmative.

Over a month later, William Conway and Edward Potter had their sentences commuted to penal servitude on 6 March 1921. Conway was later transferred to various prisons in England, including Dartmoor, Portland, and Frongoch in Wales.

== Later life and death ==
Following the amnesty of December 1921, Conway returned to Ireland. As an early member of the Gaelic Athletic Association he remained an organiser of the sport for a number of years. He was also a playing member of Faughs and Grocer's Club.

The then Taoiseach Liam Cosgrave attended his burial at Deans Grange Cemetery in 1976. William Conway was given full military honours at his funeral.
