= May Gibney =

Irish nationalist and republican

- Born: Mary Bridget Gibney; 2 October 1893; Tralee, County Kerry, Ireland
- Died: 1984 (aged 90–91); Dublin, Ireland
- Spouse: Laurence O'Neill
- Children: 4

May Bridget Gibney (2 October 1893 – 1984) was an Irish nationalist and republican, active during the Easter Rising of 1916 and both the War of Independence and the Irish Civil War.

== Early life ==
Mary Bridget Gibney was born in 1893 to Thomas Gibney and Mary O'Reilly in Tralee, County Kerry. She was the eldest of three children. Her father was in the Royal Irish Constabulary and the family was not nationalist; she was the only active member. She was almost 5 when her father died on 20 September 1898 in Dublin and the family went to live with an aunt. She was educated in the Model School in Marlborough Street and later the Kings Inns School.

== Easter Rising ==
When the 1916 Easter Rising started Gibney approached the garrison at the General Post Office and asked to join them. She knew one of the volunteers on duty and she was allowed in. She remained at the GPO for the rest of the week. She was involved in general activities, including cooking and first aid but also delivered messages to other garrisons such as the one to Michael Mallin at the Royal College of Surgeons.

When she was told to leave she and Bridget Connolly were making their way home when they were arrested and sent to Broadstone Station. However, on this occasion she was not detained for very long.

== After the Rising ==
Once the Rising was over Gibney remained active with the nationalist movement and joined Cumann na mBan in September of that year (1916). She had met her fiancé Dick McKee, who was a Commandant of the Irish Volunteers and later the Irish Republican Army in Dublin, in 1915. During the War of Independence she operated as a courier for the IRA., carrying messages, hiding and moving weapons, and hid Victor Murphy, a Jacob's factory garrison member who had avoided arrest with the others. Following the killing of about 13 British agents in Dublin, McKee and two others were arrested, interrogated, tortured and then was shot dead on Bloody Sunday on 21 November 1920 during the War of Independence.

Gibney continued to find hideouts for men during the war as well as getting involved in the elections. She also continued to act as a courier between Dublin commands and the rest of the country. It was during these trips that she met the man who would be her husband, Laurence O'Neill, Commander of the Carlow Brigade, I.R.A. Her roles during the war also included gathering intelligence and providing first aid, acting as a look-out and hiding weapons. The Anglo-Irish Treaty was signed in 1921 and the partition of Ireland came into effect in 1922. Gibney was opposed to the Treaty and fought on the Anti-Treaty side in the Civil War which followed. She was arrested in 1922 and was detained in Kilmainham Gaol for nine months.

== Later life ==
After the war, in 1929, she married Laurence O'Neill in Dublin, where they had four children, three daughters and one son. She worked at the Hospital Sweeps Stakes for a time. One of her daughters became artist Sally Smyth who created a series of art exhibited in and about Kilmainham and the incarcerated. Gibney died in 1984 and was buried with military honours.
