= Peadar Clancy =

Irish republican (1888–1920)

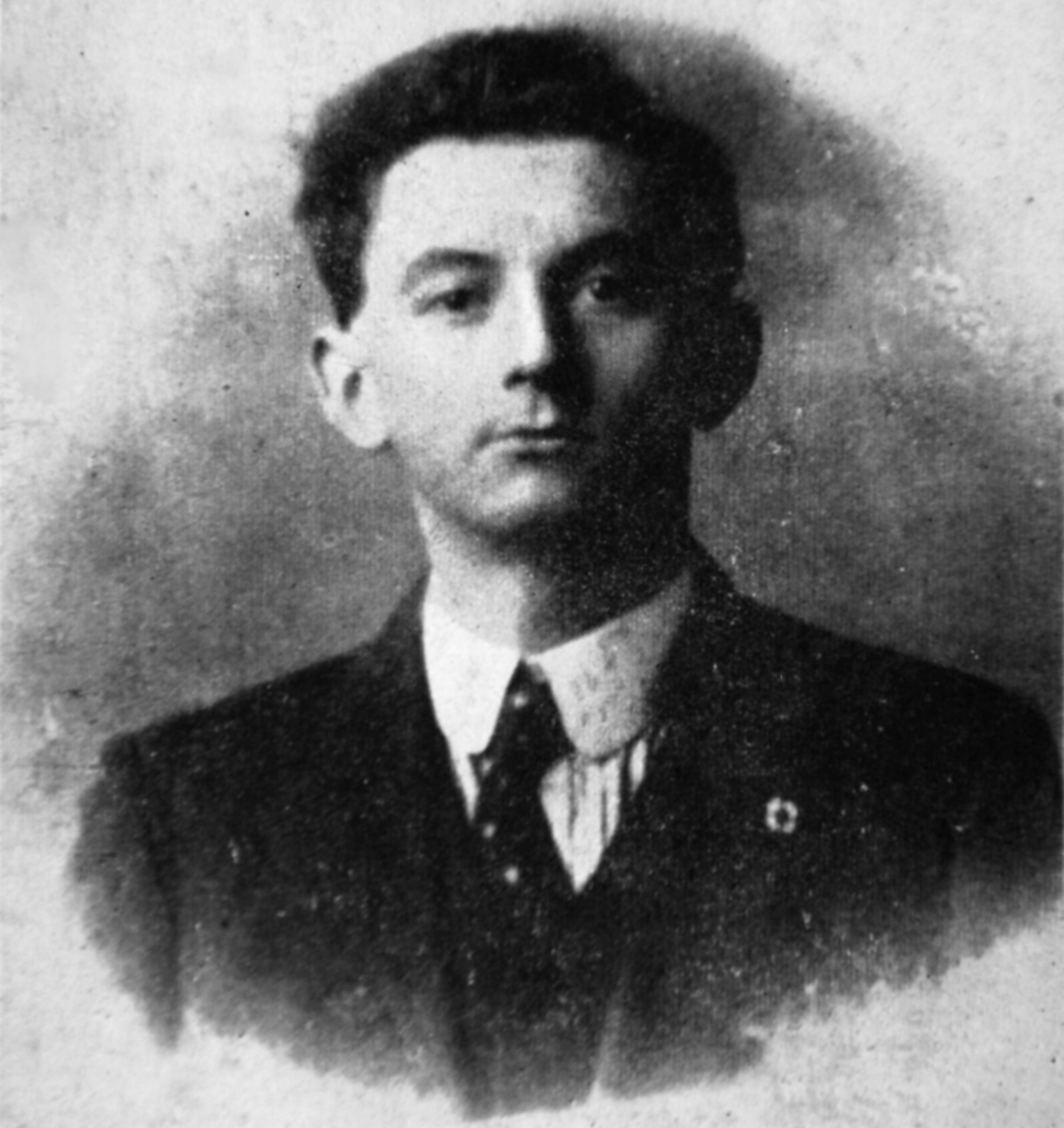
- Born: 9 November 1888; Carrowreagh East, Cranny, County Clare, Ireland
- Died: 22 November 1920 (aged 32) Dublin Castle, Dublin, Ireland
- Buried: Glasnevin Cemetery, Dublin, Ireland
- Allegiance: Irish Republic
- Service: Irish Volunteers; Irish Republican Army
- Service years: 1913–1920
- Rank: Vice-Brigadier
- Commands: 2-in-C, Dublin Brigade
- Conflicts: Easter Rising; Irish War of Independence
- Memorials: Clancy Barracks

Peadar Clancy (Irish: Peadar Mac Fhlannchadha; 9 November 1888 – 22 November 1920) was an Irish republican who served with the Irish Volunteers in the Four Courts garrison during the 1916 Easter Rising and was second-in-command of the Dublin Brigade of the Irish Republican Army (IRA) during the War of Independence. Along with Dick McKee and Conor Clune, he was shot dead by his guards while under detention in Dublin Castle on the eve of Sunday, 21 November 1920, a day known as Bloody Sunday that also saw the killing of a network of British intelligence agents by the Squad unit of the Irish Republican Army and the killing of 14 people in Croke Park by the Royal Irish Constabulary.

== Early life ==
Clancy was one of seven sons and six daughters born to James and Mary Clancy (née Keane), of Carrowreagh East, Cranny, County Clare in 1888. The Clancy home had been the meeting place for local Fenians since the 1860s. Though the Fenians had been instrumental in reawakening Irish culture through the Gaelic League, drama and the Gaelic Athletic Association, this form of "advanced nationalism" was not popular at this time. From a young age Clancy was a keen Gaelic Leaguer and was engrossed by national activities. Educated at the local national school, which was close to his family home, at sixteen he became apprenticed in the drapery business of Dan Moloney, in Kildysart. On completing his apprenticeship he went to Newcastle West, County Limerick, where he worked as an assistant in the drapery business of Michael O'Shaughnessy on Bridge Street. From there, he moved to Youghal, County Cork, where he lived at 6 North Main Street, from which address he wrote to his infant nephew in Chicago on 17 October 1912. In 1913 he went to work for Harkin's General Drapery, at 70A New Street in Dublin.

== Easter Rising ==
On coming to Dublin, Clancy joined the Irish Volunteers upon their inception, becoming a Volunteer in "CO" company, 1st Battalion, Dublin Brigade. During the 1916 Easter Rising he served in the Four Courts garrison, alongside Dick McKee. Clancy was to distinguish himself in combat, when, with a group of Volunteers, he repelled an infantry attack at Church Street Bridge and forced an enemy retreat towards the Phoenix Park on Easter Monday. Shortly afterwards, Clancy personally burnt out a sniper from a house, and during the course of the Rising single-handedly captured Lord Dunsany and Colonel Lindsay. Lord Dunsany, though wounded by Clancy, said of the Republicans after his release: "Although in different uniforms, we are all Irishmen and you are all gentlemen." For the "courage, leadership and intelligence" shown during this period, he was promoted to Lieutenant by Captain Frank Fahy. After the Rising he was court-martialed and sentenced to death for his part in the rebellion; but his sentence was commuted to penal servitude for 10 years. He remained in English jails until June 1917, and upon his return to Dublin he helped to re-organise the Volunteers.

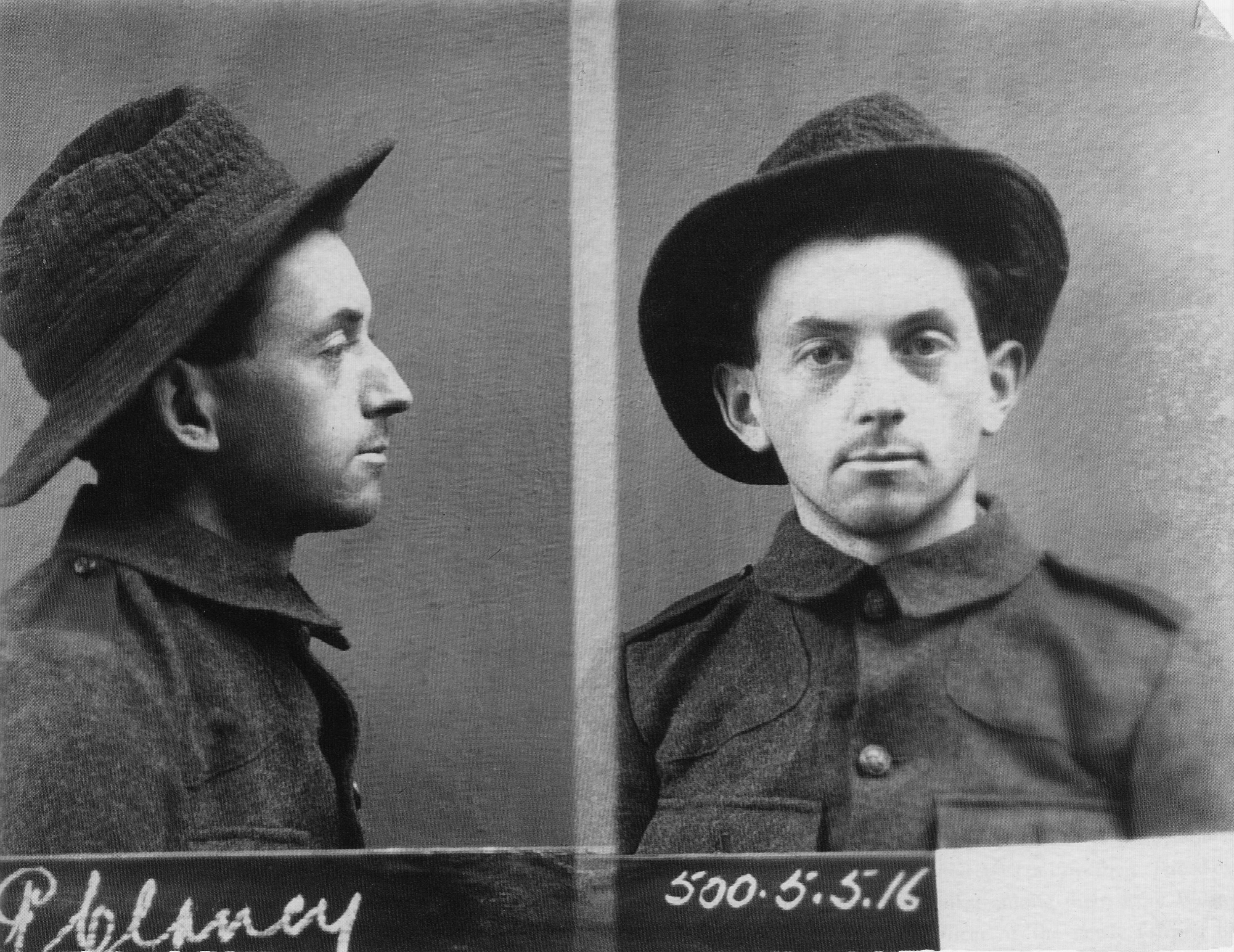
Peadar Clancy photographed at Richmond Barracks following the rebel surrender on Easter 1916.

== Republican Outfitters ==
After his release, Clancy started a drapery business of his own, called The Republican Outfitters, which was located at 94 Talbot Street. According to Dan Breen, it was one of the best-known meeting places in Dublin for the IRA, and was so closely watched that it was never advisable to remain there for long. By 1917, it was advertising as The Republican Outfitters: Clancy, Brennan and Walsh. Clancy's initial partners in the business were Maurice Brennan, Thomas Walsh (who, like Clancy, had been in the Four Courts garrison at Easter 1916, had been sentenced to death, but was later reprieved) and other comrades. By 1920, the initial partnership had been dissolved, Brennan and Walsh had gone out on their own at 5 Upper O'Connell Street (which was also used as a base by the Volunteers, with Walsh acting as intelligence officer of the 1st Battalion) and Tom Hunter had become part proprietor of the Talbot Street business with Clancy.

== Sinn Féin ==
After his release from prison he was selected as the Sinn Féin candidate in the East Clare by-election, but his candidature was not ratified by IRA General Headquarters (GHQ) and Éamon de Valera was chosen at a second convention in Ennis. Clancy, in a letter to his brother M. J, who lived in Chicago, wrote about the divide in Irish society over the war and the split in the Volunteers, which he believed had resulted from the position adopted by John Redmond, the leader of the Irish Parliamentary Party:

There is a very vast range of subjects on which I should like to write to you about; particularly with regard to the great European war. There has been a very pointed and sharp division of opinion in Ireland with regards to it, created to a very great extent by the attitude that Mr. Redmond has taken up. I understand that diversity of opinion obtains to a very great extent in America too, but our sources of information from America are altogether one sided in this country since the Government has prohibited the circulation of the Irish World and the Gaelic American in Ireland.

Clancy took part in de Valera's election campaign, and addressed a number of meetings throughout his native county in the summer of 1917. After the election, on 24 July 1917, Clancy again wrote to his brother on the outcome and the position the Republicans would adopt:

My Dear Brother, I got your letter about ten days ago & as you hoped I was then free. We were released about a month ago. Needless to say we were not sorry to get away from England’s jails and jailers. Since my release I had a busy and exciting fortnight. We had an election in East Clare - a parliamentary election. There were two candidates a Sinn Féiner and an Irish Party man. Our man won by the magnificent majority of 2,975. He was in jail with me. His name is de Valera. For one year & two months England treated him as if he were one of the worst criminals and Ireland confers on him the highest dignity it is in her power to confer. Another comrade of mine was elected to represent South Longford while we were yet in jail. As the vacancies occur the same thing will happen everywhere throughout the country until we have wiped out the vile Redmondites who have betrayed Ireland.

In 1918 Clancy was sent to County Tyrone to support the Sinn Fein candidate in the 1918 East Tyrone by-election. While in Cookstown, County Tyrone Clancy was attacked and stoned by persons opposed to the Sinn Fein candidate Seán Milroy.

== War of Independence ==
During the Irish War of Independence, Clancy became immersed in the underground movement and carried out a number of daring feats, which ensured his rise to become the second-in-command of the Dublin Brigade, IRA, with the rank of Vice-Brigadier. He was also attached to GHQ where he held the rank of Director of Munitions. His immediate superior was his Easter Week colleague Dick McKee. Clancy, along with chief of staff of the Volunteers Richard Mulcahy, was instrumental in the escape of leading Republican prisoners from Mountjoy Jail on 29 March 1919. Among those to escape were Piaras Beaslaí, J. J. Walsh, Paddy Fleming and Thomas Malone. Clancy and Mulcahy were both in charge of those who were to help the escape plan from outside the prison, while Michael Collins and his intelligence squad were to look after the plans of escape within the prison. In all nineteen prisoners escaped. The escape was considered a major coup by Republicans and was a boost to morale.

The Squad, also known as the Twelve Apostles, was a counter-intelligence unit established in September 1919. This unit was to function as an urban flying column, which was to specialise in the killing of British intelligence agents and those police who were attentive in combatting the IRA. At its inaugural meeting the IRA leadership was represented by Peadar Clancy, along with Dick McKee, Michael Collins and Mick McDonnell.

Clancy was also involved in the Republican breakout from Strangeways Prison in Manchester, England on 25 October 1919. Michael Collins had taken a particular interest in the escape, and actually visited Austin Stack in the prison to finalise the arrangements. In all six prisoners were to escape, among them Piaras Beaslaí who had again been arrested.

During the last three months of 1919, no less than twelve different ambushes were planned on the Lord Lieutenant of Ireland, Lord French. In most cases the target failed to show, or was either too late or too early to suit his would-be assassins' designs. On one occasion Peadar Clancy and Dan Breen waited for two hours outside the door of the practice of Dr. James Ashe, a specialist on Merrion Square whom French occasionally visited.

On 19 December 1919, the Squad assembled at Kelly's, known locally as the Halfway House, on the Navan Road in Cabra. They planned to ambush Lord French, as he made his way from Ashtown railway station to the Phoenix Park. The Lord Lieutenant escaped the ambush, but one of the Volunteers, Martin Savage, was killed.

The next morning, the Irish Independent published an article which described the attackers as "assassins" and included other such terms as "criminal folly", "outrage"' and "murder". Taking these terms as an insult to their dead comrade, the Volunteers decided to attack the paper. On the Sunday, at 9pm, between twenty and thirty Volunteers under Clancy entered the offices of the Independent. They informed the editor of their intentions and began to dismantle and smash the machinery. Despite this action, with the assistance of the other Dublin papers, the Independent was able to appear the next day, and the owners were awarded £16,000 in compensation. According to Breen, neither the Independent nor any other Dublin paper referred to the IRA as murderers or assassins again.

On 5 February 1920, members of the Squad, under Clancy, led a raid on the navy and army canteen board garage. In the raid the Dublin Brigade got away with two Ford motor vans and a motorcycle, along with tools and motor parts. The vans would later be used by the Squad in a number of operations.

On 12 February, Clancy again led a team of the Squad, this time in the attempted rescue of Robert Barton, who was to stand trial before a military tribunal. They planned to intercept the truck transporting the prisoner to Mountjoy Jail. The rescue went according to plan, but when they went to the back of the truck, Barton was not there. Barton had been taken to Marlborough Barracks (now McKee Barracks) instead, and he was sentenced the following week to three years and transferred to a prison in England. In response to a major breakout of violence in Derry, Clancy and McKee were sent there to organize and support the local IRA (see: The Troubles in Ulster (1920–1922).

Clancy, again in charge, commanded the daylight raid for weapons on the Kings Inns in Dublin, on 21 June 1920. His unit managed to capture a number of British soldiers and a large quantity of weapons and ammunition. Also with Clancy that day was a young Volunteer named Kevin Barry who, at 18, was to become the first Volunteer to be executed since the Easter Rising. The haul included 25 rifles, 2 Lewis light machine guns, as well as the ammunition. The 25 British soldiers were then released as the Volunteers withdrew from the area.

On 11 October 1920, Seán Treacy and Dan Breen narrowly escaped capture while staying in a safe house in Fernside, a middle class area of Dublin. Professor Carlon, the owner of the house, was later to die as a result of the attack on the house, along with five British soldiers. Clancy and McKee became actively involved in the protection of both Breen and Tracy.

On 14 October 1920, the Squad, along with Dick McKee and Peadar Clancy, planned to assassinate Hamar Greenwood, and General Tudor, two of the top British officers in Ireland. They met in the back of Clancy's shop, The Republican Outfitters, in Talbot Street. When they received intelligence that neither of the officers would be present at the intended event, the operation was called off. As some of the Squad was leaving they met Seán Tracy, and informed him of events. Tracy continued on towards the shop.

Tracy was in the process of planning the rescue of Dan Breen, who lay wounded in the Mater Hospital. They had learned that the hospital was to be raided, and wanted to get Breen out in time. According to Dan Breen, Tracy had been so intent on providing for his safety that he had neglected his own. Tracy had been followed to The Republican Outfitters, and he had failed to notice.

The others had not moved much further when they heard the shots ring out. A raid on the shop had been planned, and Tracy had arrived just before the soldiers. Clancy was at Nelson's Pillar when he saw the trucks filled with soldiers pass, he surmised that the shop was to be raided, but had no way of warning his comrades. Tracy, along with two civilians, was killed in the incident. McKee only narrowly avoided capture, by escaping on a bicycle during the confusion at the time of the shooting.

On 20 November, Clancy, along with members of the GHQ staff, met at 35 Lower Gardiner Street, Dublin. The meeting was called to discuss the final arrangements for what would be the rout of the British secret service, with the elimination of the Cairo Gang. Cathal Brugha felt there was insufficient evidence against some of those named, and there was to be no room for doubt. Collins stated that the operation must be done at exactly 9am. Collins remarked: "These whores, the British, have got to learn that Irishmen can turn up on time."

== Arrest and interrogation ==
Having concluded the meeting, they dispersed. Collins, Clancy and some of the others went to Vaughan's Hotel. While they were in the hotel, the porter, Christy Harte, became suspicious of one of the guests, a Mr Edwards. Edwards had made a late-night telephone call, and then left the hotel. Harte informed the Volunteers, who then quickly left the building.

In the confusion, Conor Clune had been overlooked and remained in the hotel. The hotel was then raided a few minutes later. Clune was the only one arrested as he was not registered as a guest. This, according to Seán Kavanagh, a member of the Squad, would ultimately cost him his life. Clancy and McKee were also arrested in the early hours of the morning in another part of the city, though the Cairo Gang assassination plan was already in motion, for the next day.

They were captured in Sean Fitzpatrick's of Gloucester Street and brought to Dublin Castle. It was later discovered they were betrayed to the British authorities by Irish former soldier James "Shanker" Ryan, variously described as "a ne’er do well", "a drunken bousey" and "a tout". The Squad, led by Bill Stapleton, later killed Ryan, in February 1921, in a pub near the Five Lamps in Dublin.

Upon their arrest, the three men were taken to the old detective office in the Exchange Court. According to T. Ryle Dwyer, the room was being used as a kind of guardroom, and was furnished with some beds, tables and some stores, which included a box of hand grenades.

Brigadier-General Ormonde Winter, head of the British Secret Service in Ireland, and two Auxiliary Division officers, Captain Hardy and Captain King, were the personnel who interrogated Clancy, McKee and Connor Clune.

== Death and inquest ==
According to T. Ryle Dwyer, the prisoners "supposedly" got hold of hand grenades and threw them. One of the sentries testified that he and a colleague heard a noise behind them and noticed that two of the prisoners had thrown the grenades at them. They dived for cover behind some mattresses, but the grenades did not detonate. One of the prisoners was also said to have got hold of a rifle according to one of the guards, which he levelled and fired at the guard commander as he entered the room, but missed. The prisoner then turned the rifle and fired another shot at another guard. The guard said he then fired at the prisoner, and the prisoner dropped, and that the guard commander also fired at the prisoner. The guard commander said, on hearing a noise, he entered the room, and "the prisoner McKee fired at me", and that McKee then turned and fired at the sentry. The guard commander also claimed to have dropped McKee. He then said he saw Clancy with a shovel, and that Clancy was attempting to strike another guard. One of the guards (who had dived behind the mattresses) then fired at Clancy and he fell. A fourth witness was to tell much the same story.

According to Sean O'Mahony, they were tortured in the guardroom in order to extort from them the names of the Volunteers who had earlier that morning shot the fourteen members of the Cairo Gang. Refusing to talk, they were "subsequently murdered" on the evening of 21 November 1920.

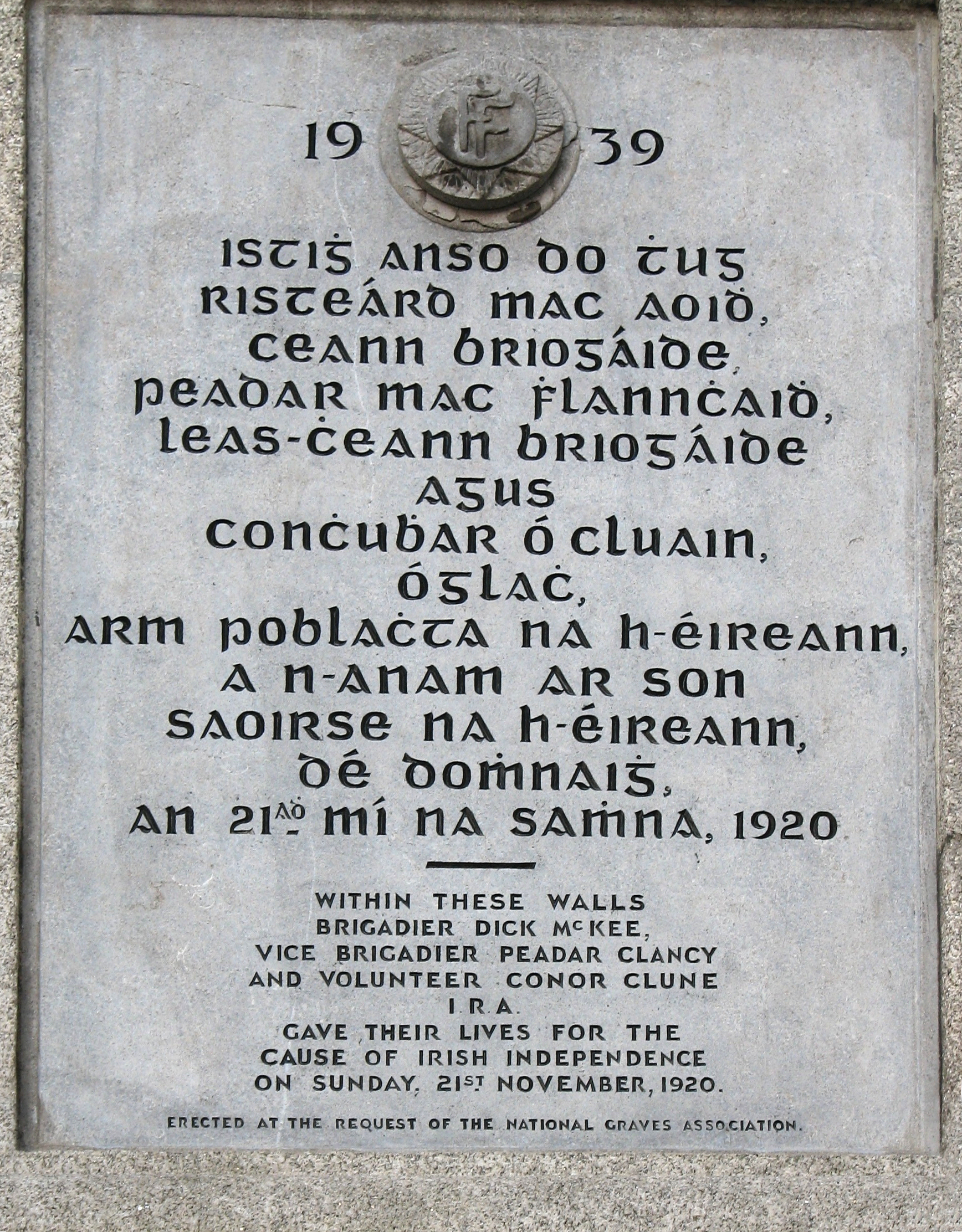
Commemorative plaque in memory of the three Volunteers, erected by the National Graves Association above the door of the guard room at Dublin Castle.

The condition of their bodies when returned by the British authorities to their families supports this assertion. There were extensive signs of discolouring, which seemed to indicate extensive bruising. A military doctor claimed that large staining could occur, and this would depend on the way the bodies had been lying. He also said that Clancy had been hit with up to five bullets, which made eight wounds; Dick McKee had three wounds caused by two bullets. He said McKee had no bayonet wounds, but there was a bullet lodged underneath his skin on the right of his chest. Clune, he said, had nine wounds caused by seven bullets. T. Ryle Dwyer also states that David Neligan was adamant that they had not been bayoneted.

Collins arranged for the collection of their bodies when they were released by the military. They were taken to a small chapel at Dublin's Pro-Cathedral. According to Ernie O'Malley, Collins had the bodies of the men examined to ease the minds of their comrades. Piaras Beaslaí contends that the examination showed that McKee had been "savagely mistreated", and said a bayonet had punctured his liver. In addition, he had also suffered broken ribs.

The body of Peadar Clancy, according to Daniel McCarthy, was bullet ridden; while Sean O'Mahony contends that McKee had been bayoneted in the liver, and had suffered from a number of broken ribs, abrasions to the face and many bullet wounds. Robert Kee, in his work The Green Flag, writes, "though their bodies were riddled with bullets, their faces did not bear the marks of torture and brutality as has often been asserted."

Conor Clune's employer, the genealogist Edward MacLysaght, took charge of his body when the authorities released it. He then had the body medically examined. The examination proved that Clune had been shot thirteen times in the chest. This, Sean O'Mahony writes, was abundant evidence that the excuse put forward that he was trying to escape was a complete fabrication.

On 24 November 1920, The Times newspaper reported that three Irish Republican prisoners were shot while trying to escape military custody. Affidavits by MacLysaght and evidence given by both British and Republican members "give the lie to the false official version", according to Daniel McCarthy, as the article was published even before the military inquiry had reported its findings. As a result of these deaths in custody the British authorities held a military court of inquiry. Its report, issued on 3 December 1920, found that death was the result of: "Bullet wounds fired by members of the Auxiliary Division, Royal Irish Constabulary, in self defence and in execution of their duty, i.e. in preventing the escape of the deceased party, who was in their lawful custody." The American Commission for Evidence of Conditions in Ireland commented in 1920 that: "numerous cases had come before the commission where the reason alleged by the Crown forces for shooting civilians has been their connection with the Irish Republican Army and their attempts to escape after they have been made prisoner". It stretches credibility somewhat, according to Sean O'Mahony, that the garrison of Dublin Castle found it impossible to prevent the escape of three unarmed prisoners from the guardroom without shooting them.

Collins was later provided with information on the Auxiliaries responsible (F Company) through Major Reynolds of F Company. Frank Thornton, one of Collins intelligence staff, was to receive information and photographs of the "murder gang", not only of F Company but of Q Company and a number of others also.

Brigadier-General Frank Percy Crozier later resigned in disgust as leader of the Auxiliaries. This came after General Tudor, head of police operations, undermined Crozier's efforts to discipline some of his men for their conduct. Among them was Captain William King, who was "particularly notorious", and believed by Republicans to have been involved in the deaths in the Castle. King was charged with the death of another two men who also had been killed while trying to escape. The Times newspaper at the time noted that "the postures suggest that the two men had been placed sided by side and with their backs to the wall before being shot". King along with two others were later acquitted.

A book titled Death in the Castle: Three murders in Dublin Castle 1920, written by Sean O'Mahony, and published by 1916–1921 Club records both the lives and deaths of the three Republicans.

== Burial and legacy ==
The bodies of McKee and Clancy were laid side by side at a requiem mass in the Pro-Cathedral. Both were dressed in their Volunteer uniforms and their tricolour-draped coffins bore their caps and belts. Michael Collins risked his security to be present at the service. According to Richard Mulcahy, Collins was distraught at their deaths, as they were "the two men who fully understood the inside of Collins’ work and his mind, and who were ever ready and able to link up their resources of the Dublin brigade to any work that Collins had in hand, and to do so promptly, effectively and sympathetically."

A photograph of Collins was actually published in the Evening Herald carrying one of the coffins out to the waiting hearse. Collins then went to their graveside, and was filmed stepping from the crowd to lay a wreath on the grave, on which he pinned a farewell note, which read: "In memory of two good friends ― Dick and Peadar ― two of Ireland's best soldiers."

Later Collins, through his intelligence network, discovered the name of Corporal James 'Shankers' Ryan of the Royal Military Police, who was responsible for the arrest of the two Volunteers. He was killed by The Squad at Hynes' pub in Gloucester Place on 5 February of the same year.

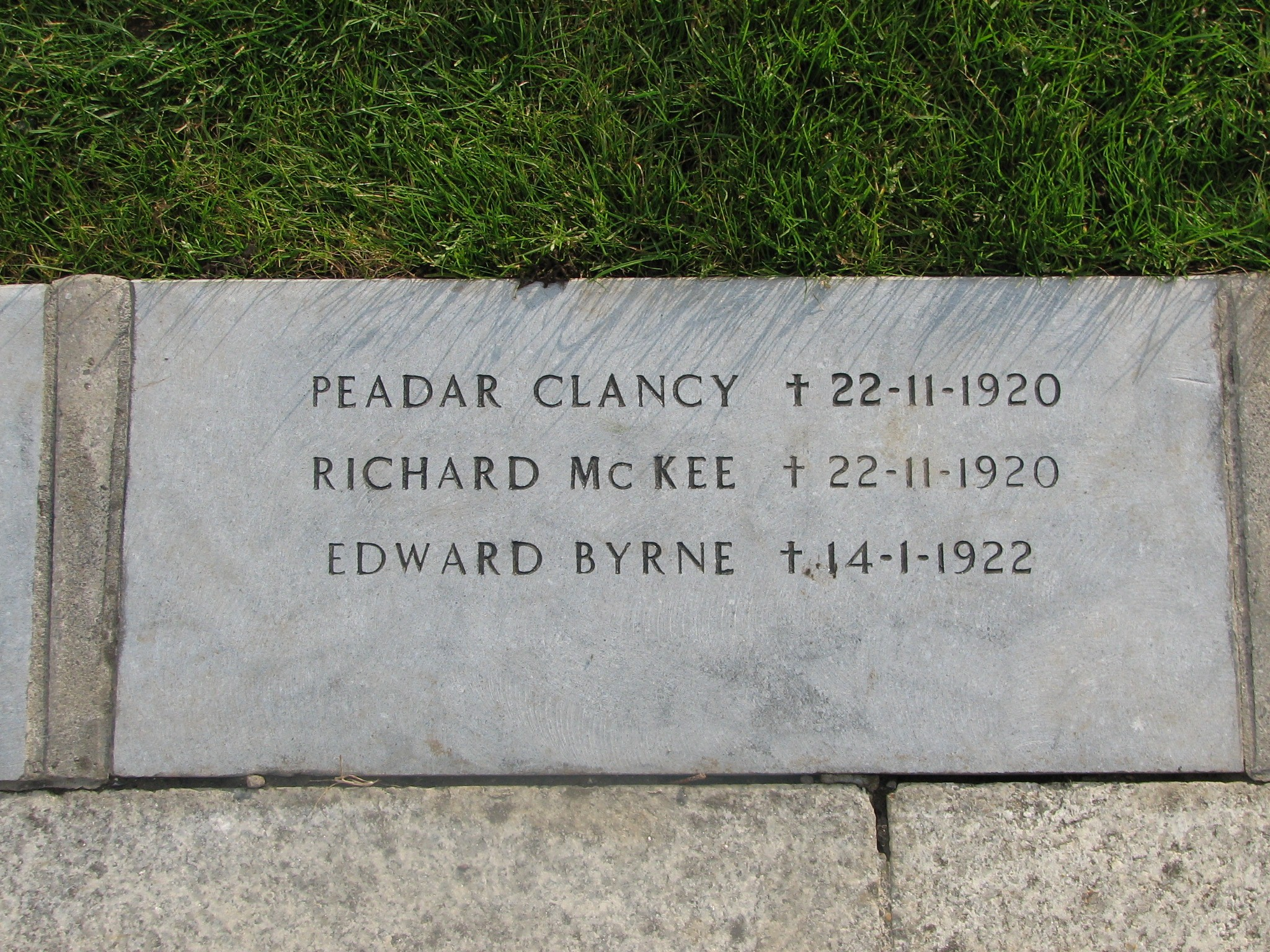
The Grave of Clancy and McKee in the Republican Plot, Glasnevin Cemetery, Dublin.

Clancy and McKee were buried in the Republican plot in Glasnevin cemetery. Peadar Clancy was 32 years old at the time of his death. The Islandbridge Barracks was renamed Clancy Barracks and the former Marlborough Barracks was renamed McKee Barracks in their honour. A number of streets in Finglas were also named after Clancy, McKee and Clune. In 1939 a commemorative plaque was erected on the external wall of the guardroom of Dublin Castle in Exchange Court next to City Hall. A commemorative bust of Clancy is also displayed on top of a plinth in the main square in Kildysart, County Clare. Part of Moore Street in Kilrush was also renamed as Clancy Street.

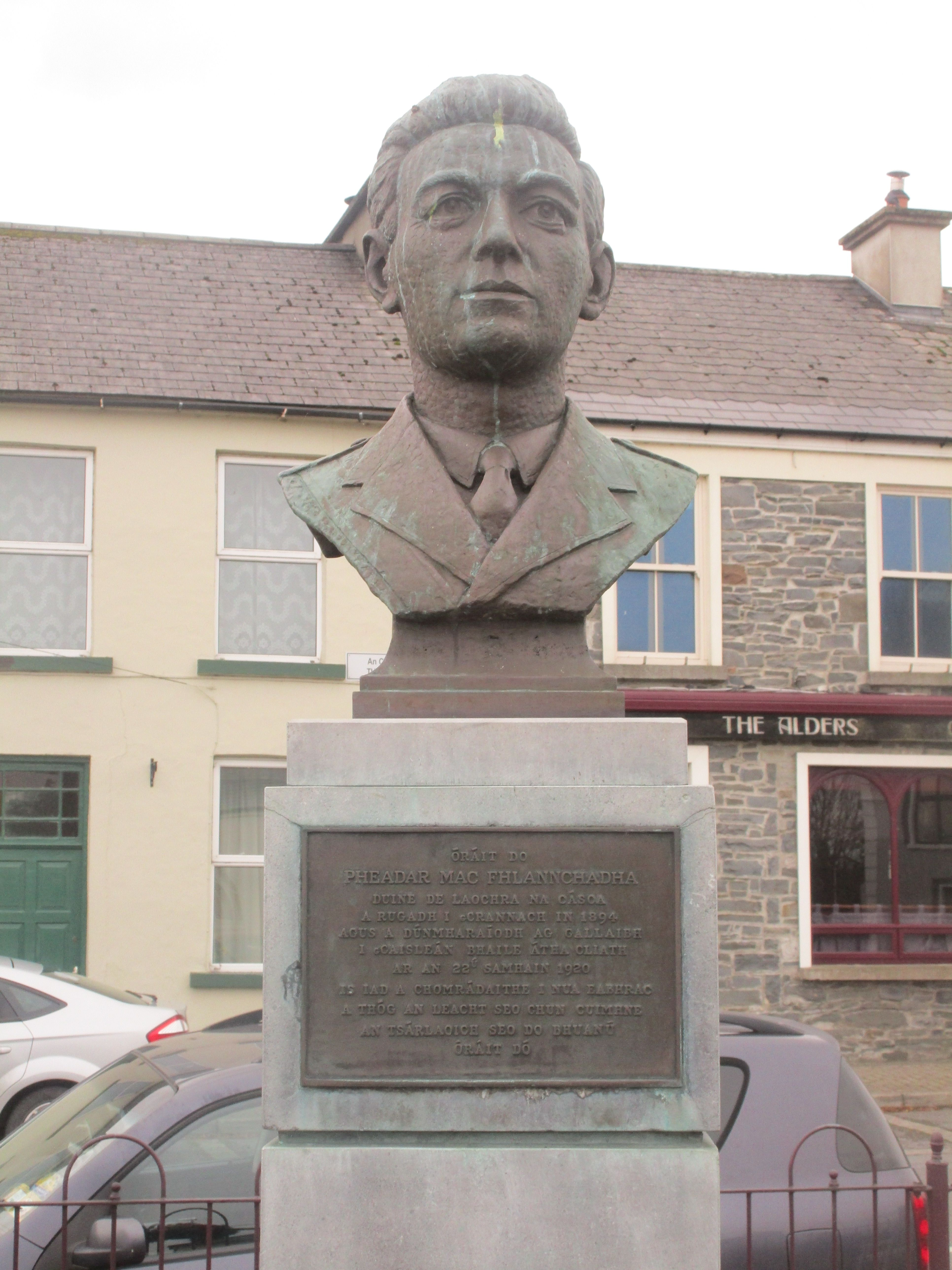
Clancy Memorial bust in Kildysart

Conor Clune's body was brought home to County Clare for burial. His coffin was draped with the tricolour, but when a British officer objected to it, the presiding priest removed the national flag.

When Clancy was imprisoned in Mountjoy prison in 1920, he led a hunger strike with his fellow prisoners. Clancy refused all concessions from the prison authorities, eventually gaining the release of all hunger strikers (see: 1923 Irish hunger strikes in 1923 Irish hunger strikes. It was in Mountjoy that Todd Andrews first met him. In his memoir, Dublin Made Me, Andrews described Clancy's personality: "I was overcome by the extraordinary impact which Clancy’s personality had on me. I had never heard or seen Clancy before nor indeed did I ever see him again but he left an indelible impression of the superman, a man whose commands I at least would have a compulsion to obey as if I had been hypnotised ... In the presence of Clancy I felt a mere puppet on a string."

Andrews also wrote in his book Man of No Property that "I have always believed that all individuals are, as human beings, equally important. My approach to them has been the same, high or low. Two only, among all the people I met, did I put in a class apart: they were Peadar Clancy and Gunnar Myrdal." Kathleen Clarke said of Clancy that he was of an "outstanding type".

Dan Breen, in his book My Fight for Irish Freedom, described both Clancy and McKee as "kindred spirits", who belonged to a small band of gunmen who would take any risk in the country's cause.

His great-grandnephew, Eoin Neylon was the president of Ogra Fianna Fáil for two terms.
