= Dick McKee =

Irish republican (1893–1920)

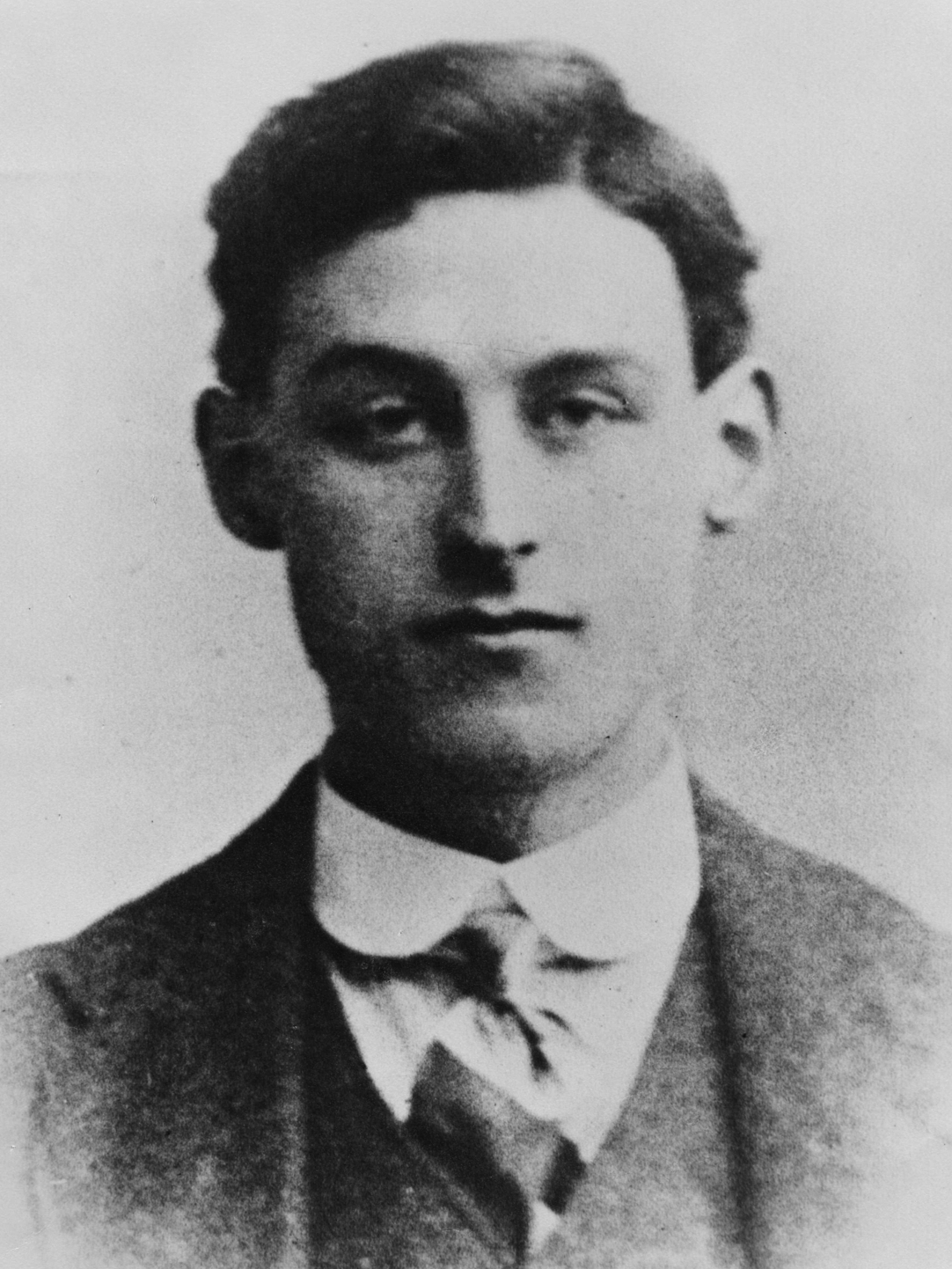
- Native name: Risteárd Mac Aoidh
- Nickname: 'Fergus'
- Born: Richard McKee; 4 April 1893; Phibsborough, Dublin, Ireland
- Died: 21 November 1920 (aged 27) Dublin Castle, Dublin, Ireland
- Buried: Glasnevin Cemetery
- Allegiance: Irish Republic
- Service: Irish Volunteers; Irish Republican Army
- Service years: 1913–1920
- Rank: Brigadier
- Commands: OC, Dublin Brigade; Director of Training
- Conflicts: Easter Rising; Irish War of Independence
- Memorials: McKee Barracks

Richard "Dick" McKee (Irish: Risteárd Mac Aoidh; 4 April 1893 – 21 November 1920) was a prominent member of the Irish Republican Army (IRA). He was also friend to some senior members in the republican movement, including Éamon de Valera, Austin Stack and Michael Collins. Along with Peadar Clancy and Conor Clune, he was killed by his captors in Dublin Castle on Sunday, 21 November 1920, a day known as Bloody Sunday that also saw the killing of a network of British intelligence agents by the "Squad" unit of the Irish Republican Army and the killing of 14 people in Croke Park by the Royal Irish Constabulary (RIC).

== Early life ==
McKee was born at Phibsborough Road in Dublin on 4 April 1893. He became an apprentice in the publishing business at Gill & Son, Upper O'Connell Street, and then a compositor.

== Military career ==
McKee joined the Irish Volunteers in 1913, serving in G Company, Second Battalion of the Dublin Brigade. He served in the 1916 Easter Rising in Jacob's Factory, under the command of Thomas MacDonagh. McKee was later incarcerated by the British authorities in Knutsford Gaol and subsequently the Frongoch internment camp in Wales.

McKee was promoted within the IRA shortly after his release. He became Company Captain and then Commandant of the Second Battalion, eventually being placed as Brigadier, or the Officer Commanding of the Dublin Brigade. He was also active as an ex-officio member of IRA General Headquarters Staff – which included Collins, Richard Mulcahy and Russell. He was a prime innovator in the formation of the flying columns along with Mulcahy and Collins. He was Director of Training for this duration, though he was jailed again as a political prisoner in Dundalk Gaol, in 1918.

McKee participated in several IRA operations during the Irish War of Independence, including an arms raid on Collinstown Aerodrome (now Dublin Airport) in which his unit captured 75 rifles and approximately 15,000 rounds of ammunition and the Kings Inns raid in which his unit captured 25 rifles, two Lewis guns and several thousand rounds of ammunition. In the final chapter of his revolutionary activism, he was on full-time active service, moving covertly through a network of safe houses.

He was engaged to May Gibney, a volunteer during the Easter Rising and an active member of Cumann na mBan. In January 1920, he resigned from Gills and worked for a time printing the An tÓglach newspaper. Eventually he returned to being a full-time Volunteer officer, operating under the nom-de-guerre of 'Fergus'.

== The Squad ==
In July 1919 Collins asked McKee to select a small group of men to form the Squad. McKee was intimately involved in the planning of Bloody Sunday 1920 which was a day of violence in Dublin on 21 November 1920, during the Irish War of Independence. More than 30 people were killed or fatally wounded which included twenty British intelligence agents at eight different locations in Dublin.

== Arrest and death ==
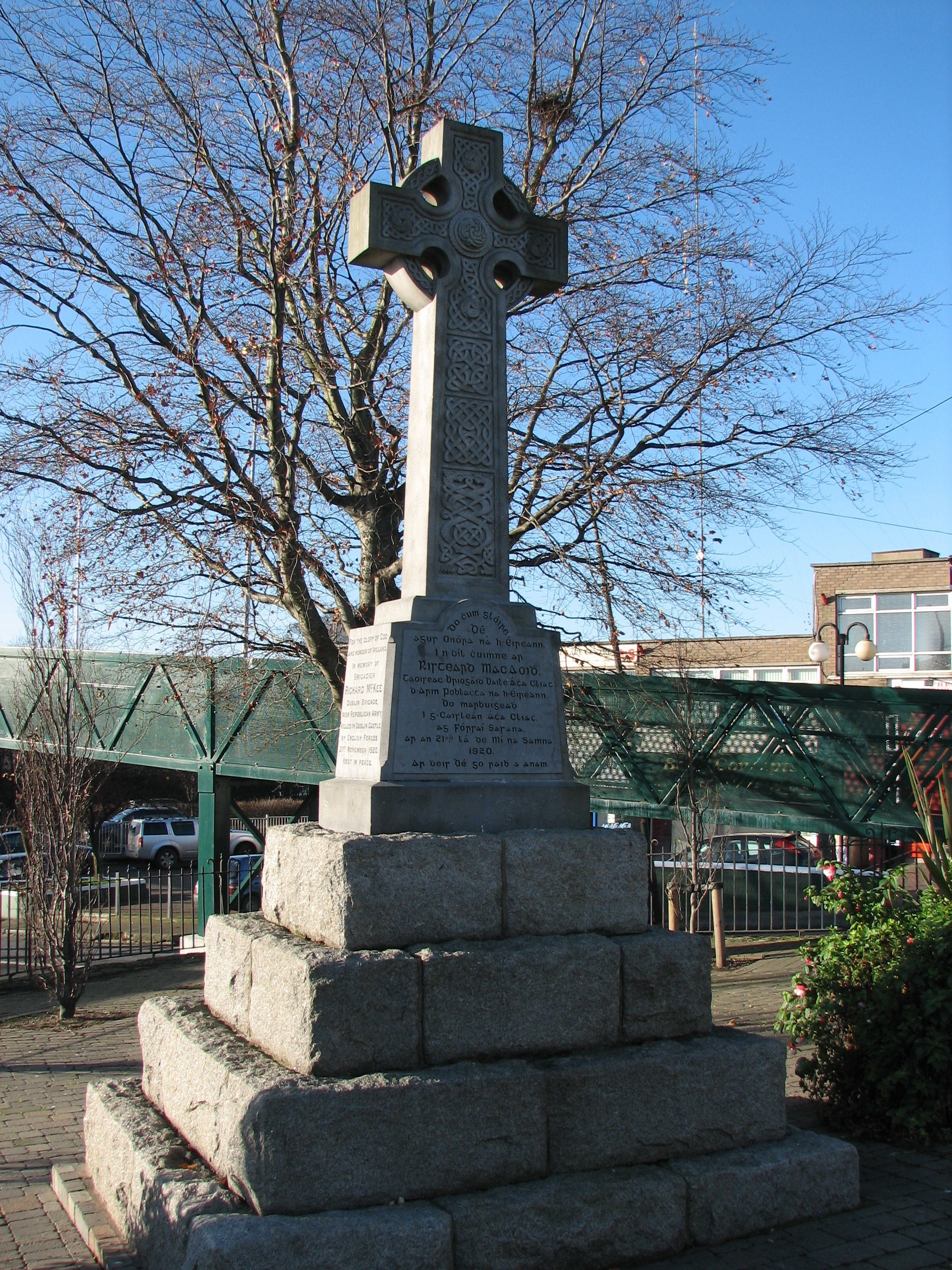
A memorial to Dick McKee was officially unveiled in Finglas village, by Éamon de Valera, on 10 June 1951

McKee was betrayed to the British authorities by an Irish veteran of the British Army, James "Shankers" Ryan, and captured at Sean Fitzpatrick's before Bloody Sunday by the Royal Irish Constabulary. (In retaliation, on 5 February 1921, an IRA squad led by Bill Stapleton walked into Hynes' pub in Gloucester Place and shot Ryan dead.)

Brought to Dublin Castle he was tortured under interrogation with Peadar Clancy and Conor Clune from County Clare. The three would later be shot on 21 November 1920. The official account was that he and the other men with him were shot while trying to escape. This account was widely disputed at the time, although some historians believe it was actually true. Michael Lynch, a IRA Brigade Commander stated that McKee suffered severe beatings prior to being shot to death: "I saw Dick McKee's body afterwards, and it was almost unrecognizable. He had evidently been tortured before being shot...They must have beaten Dick to a pulp. When they threatened him with death, according to reports, Dick's last words were, "Go on, and do your worst!" Medical examinations of the three bodies revealed broken bones and abrasions consistent with prolonged assaults and bullet wounds to the head and bodies.

A book titled Death in the Castle: Three murders in Dublin Castle 1920, written by Sean O'Mahony, and published by 1916–1921 Club records both the life and deaths of the three Republicans.

== Burial ==
McKee and Clancy's tricolour-adorned coffins lay side by side at St. Mary's Pro-Cathedral on Marlborough Street, Dublin. Aged 27 and 32 years, respectively, they were laid to rest at the Republican Plot in Glasnevin Cemetery.

McKee Barracks, formerly the Marlborough Barracks, in Dublin is named after Dick McKee.

== Gallery ==
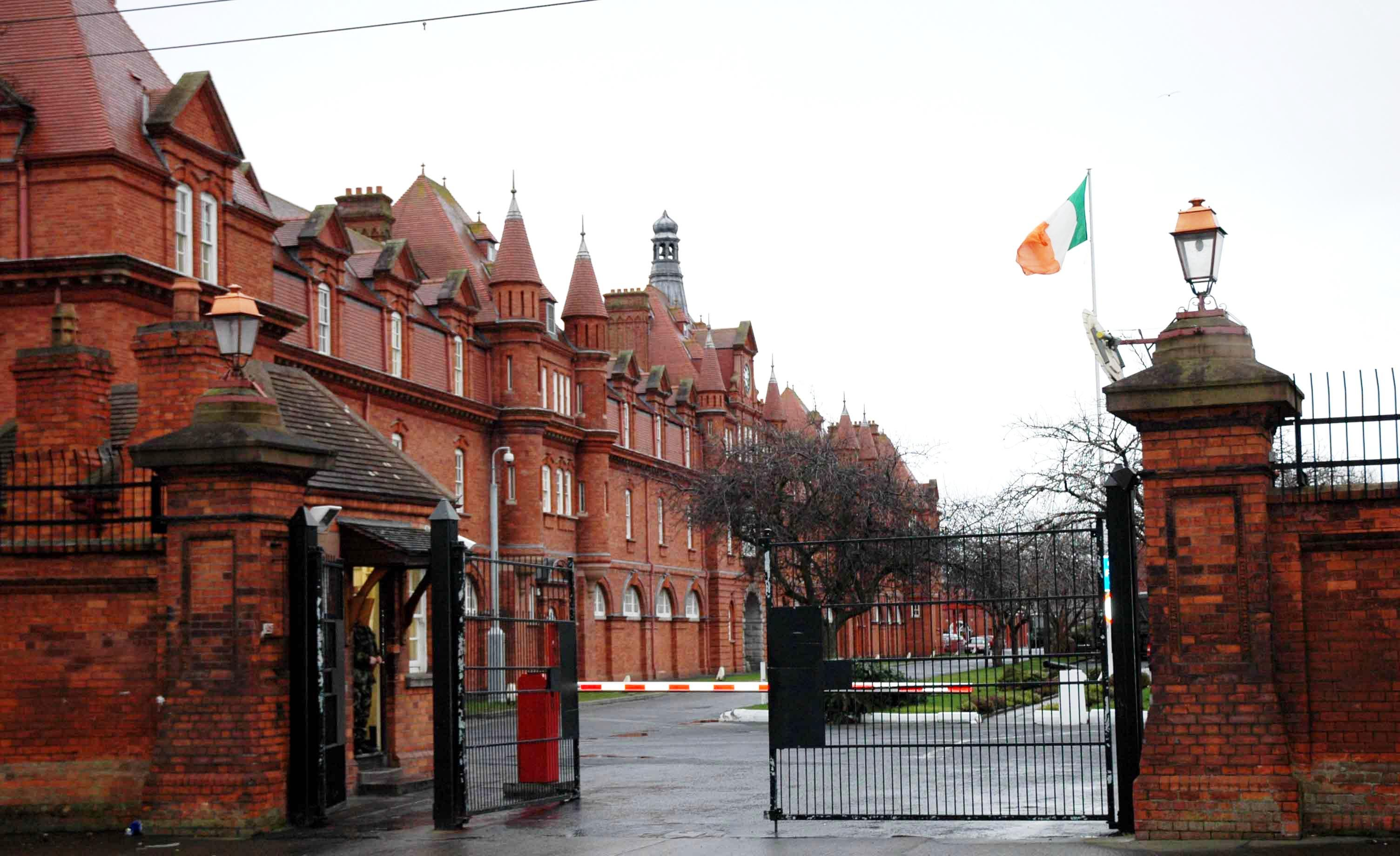
McKee Barracks, Cabra, Dublin 7

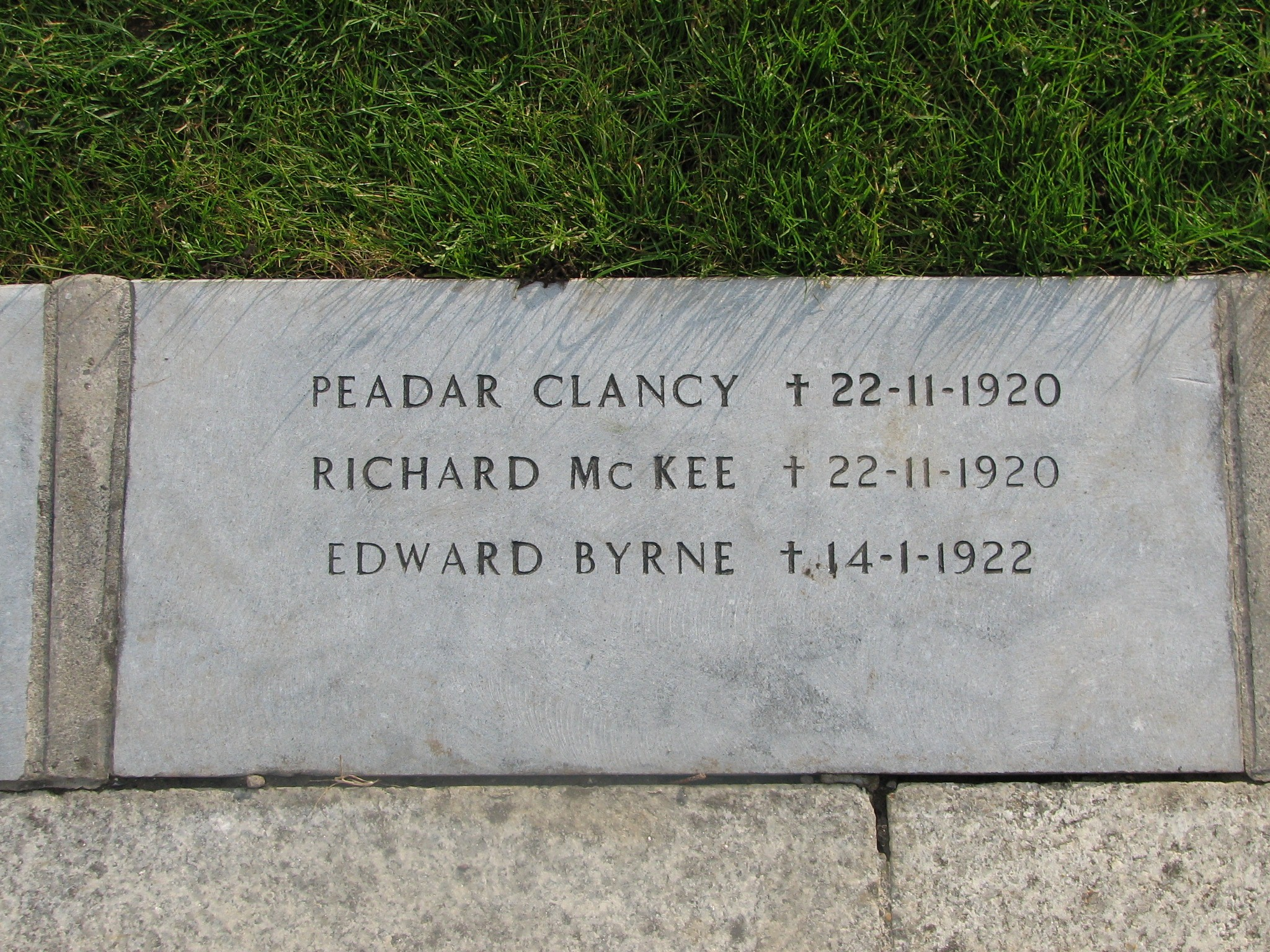
The Grave of Clancy and McKee in the Republican Plot, Glasnevin Cemetery Dublin

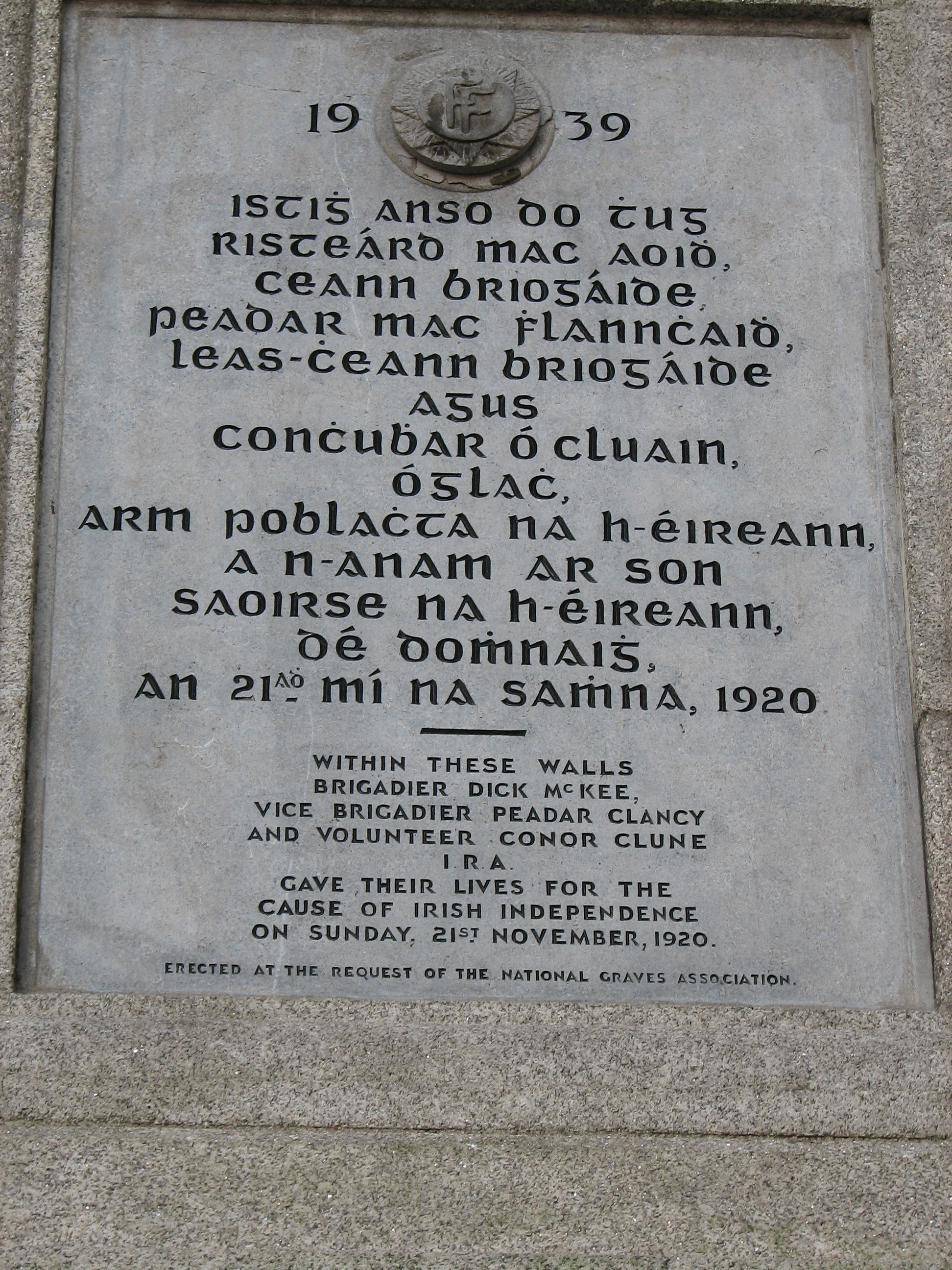
Commemorative plaque in memory of the Volunteers killed in Dublin Castle 1920
