= Clancy Quay =

Residential development in Dublin, Ireland

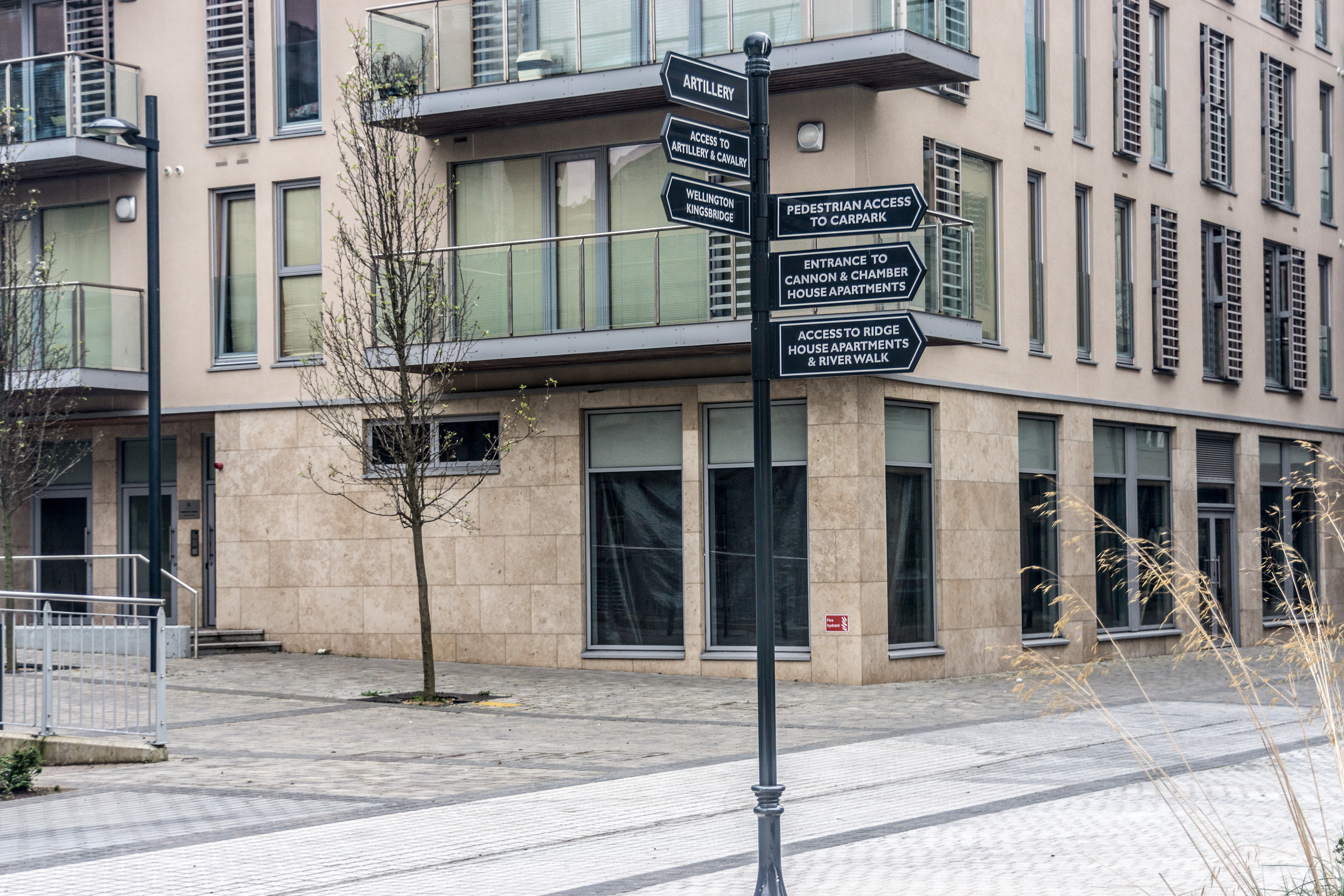
A signpost in the Clancy Quay apartment complex

Clancy Quay (Irish: Cé Mhic Fhlannchaidh) is a residential development of houses and apartments in Islandbridge, Dublin, Ireland. The development and surrounds originally housed an artillery barracks, known as Islandbridge Barracks and later Clancy Barracks, before closing in 1998. Although it has a "quay" designation, it does not form one of the Dublin quays proper.

The Clancy Quay development includes protected structures from the original barracks converted into residences, as well as new apartment buildings. In 2021 it was the largest private rental complex in Ireland with over 845 units.

== Barracks ==
The Islandbridge Barracks was established in 1798. Samuel Lewis' Topological Dictionary of Ireland in 1837 described it as follows:

The Island bridge barracks, for artillery, are adapted for 23 officers and 547 men, with stabling for 185 horses, and an hospital for 48 patients.

The British Army left the Islandbridge Barracks on 14 December 1922, following the establishment of the Irish Free State, and the barracks was handed over to the Irish Army.

It was renamed Clancy Barracks after Peadar Clancy in 1942.

== Redevelopment ==
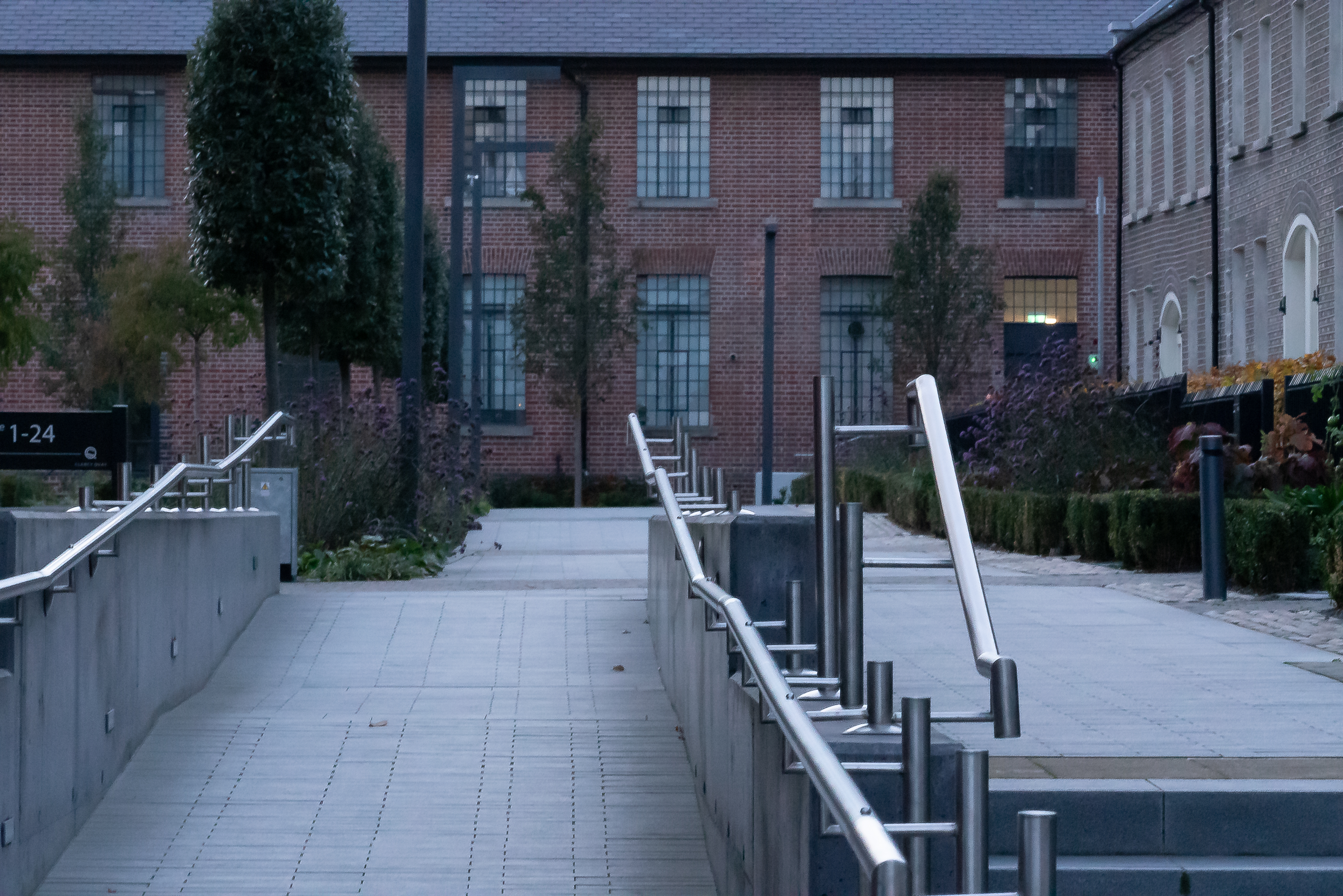
Historic buildings in Clancy Quay

The Irish Army closed Clancy Barracks in 1998, and the State sold the premises to David Kennedy's Florence Properties in 2002. The redevelopment plan was approved in 2006. In this time period, the former barracks also functioned as a major counting centre for the "Pennies from Heaven" appeal, which asked people across Ireland to donate old and foreign coinage, which was then sorted by volunteers. Over 7 million euro was donated, benefiting 11 charities. Over 120,000 euro was stolen in an armed raid of the counting centre in Clancy Barracks, but most of the money was recovered thereafter.

Kennedy lost the project during the Celtic Tiger bust, with the partially-completed development eventually being acquired by US-based Kennedy Wilson and Axa Investment Managers in 2013. The third and final phase of construction was completed in 2020.

== Popular culture ==
The area was a popular filming location until redevelopment, including the film Lassie (released 2005) and TV series' Ripper Street and Quirke (filming in 2012–2013).

== See also ==
- List of Irish military installations
