= Conor Clune =

Irish republican (1893–1920)

Conor Clune (Irish name Conchobhair Mac Clúin; 26 July 1893 – 21 November 1920) was one of three men along with Dick McKee and Peadar Clancy killed in controversial circumstances in Dublin Castle on Bloody Sunday, 1920, a day that also saw the killing of a network of British intelligence agents by the "Squad" unit of the Irish Republican Army and the killing of 14 people in Croke Park by the Royal Irish Constabulary. Clune was 27 years old.

Clune was at one time a member of the National Volunteers, the military organisation led by John Redmond that resulted from the 1914 split in the Irish Volunteers. He does not appear to have been a member of the Irish Volunteers, although the commemorative plaque in Dublin Castle refers to him as "Volunteer Conor Clune". However, he was devoted to the Irish language and was involved with the Gaelic League.

== Early life ==
Clune was born as Cornelius Clune in the village of Quin, County Clare on 26 July 1893, the son of John Clune, a carpenter, and Bridget Walsh from Kilkishen, who had married in 1874. His uncle was Archbishop Clune of Perth, who had been senior chaplain to the Catholic members of the Australian Imperial Force in World War I.

Clune was one of a family of seven boys and three girls. He was educated at the local National School and St. Flannan's College, Ennis. A Gaelic League enthusiast, he also spent some time at Ring Irish College, Colaiste na Rinne, County Waterford. From a young age he was active in Gaelic League circles, and spoke Irish on every occasion possible.

Following a period during which he worked in Dublin, he applied for and was appointed Manager at the seed and plant nursery owned by Edward MacLysaght at Raheen, Tuamgraney, about ten miles from Quin. It was with MacLysaght that he travelled to Dublin on the morning of Saturday, 20 November 1920, bringing with him the books of the Raheen Co-op for its annual audit.

== Vaughan's Hotel ==
They arrived in Dublin that Saturday evening. Clune told Mr. MacLysaght that he was to meet an Irish language enthusiast, John O'Connell. While there, Clune met Piaras Béaslaí, a member of Dáil Éireann, Director of Publicity and then Editor of An t-Óglach. They parted company, after arranging to meet on the following day.

Also on Saturday evening, Peadar Clancy, along with members of the GHQ staff of the Irish Republican Army, met at 35 Lower Gardiner Street, Dublin. The meeting was called to discuss the final arrangements for what would be the route of the British secret service, with the elimination of the Cairo Gang the following morning. Having concluded their business, the meeting dispersed, Michael Collins, Clancy, McKee and some of the others went to Vaughan's Hotel (present-day Parnell Square), then the rendezvous for many of the leaders of the IRA.

It was at this time that Clune, accompanied by Seán O'Connell, went to Vaughan's. Beaslaí was upstairs with Brigadier Dick McKee, Michael Collins, Peadar Clancy when word was brought to Beaslaí that Conor Clune from Clare was there to meet him.

While in the hotel, the porter, Christy Harte, became suspicious of one of the guests, a Mr Edwards, who had made a late-night telephone call, and then left the hotel. Harte informed the Volunteers, who quickly left the building. Beaslaí, who was familiar with the Hotel's surroundings escaped with the other senior volunteers including Michael Collins.

Clune was arrested in the raid which soon followed by British Auxiliaries. Clune was the only one arrested at Vaughan's that night as he was not registered as a guest. This, according to Seán Kavanagh, a member of the "Squad", would ultimately cost him his life. Clancy and McKee would also be arrested in the early hours of the morning in another part of the city, though the Cairo Gang assassination plan was already in motion, for the next day.

== Dublin Castle ==
Having been arrested, the three men were taken to the old detective office in the Exchange Court. According to T. Ryle Dwyer, the room was being used as a kind of guardroom, and was furnished with some beds, tables and some stores, which included a box of hand grenades Brigadier General Ormonde Winter, head of the British Secret Service in Ireland and two Auxiliary Division officers, Captain Hardy and Captain King, were the British personnel who interrogated Clune, Clancy, and McKee.

A republican prisoner, V J. Young, in custody at the time in the Castle is certain that Clune was killed in error for Seán Fitzpatrick, the man arrested with McKee and Clancy at Fitzpatrick's home in Gloucester Street. Clune and Fitzpatrick he says were of similar build and both were wearing brown suits. Young overheard two Auxiliary officers disputing the identity of one of the prisoners. One said, "That’s him" while another said" no, its him" as they looked at just Fitzpatrick and Clune.

According to T. Ryle Dwyer, the prisoners "supposedly" got hold of the hand grenades and threw them. One of the sentries testified that himself and a colleague heard a noise behind them and noticed that two of the prisoners had thrown the grenades at them. They dived for cover behind some mattresses, but the grenades did not detonate. One of the prisoners was also said to have got hold of a rifle according to one of the guards, which he levelled and fired at the guard commander as he entered the room, but missed. The prisoner then turned the rifle and fired another shot at another guard. The guard said he then fired at the prisoner, and the prisoner dropped, and that the guard commander also fired at the prisoner.

The guard commander said, on hearing a noise, entered the room, and "the prisoner McKee fired at me", and that McKee then turned and fired at the sentry. The guard commander also claimed to have dropped McKee. He then said he saw Clancy with a shovel, and that Clancy was attempting to strike another guard. One of the guards (who had dived behind the mattresses) then fired at Clancy and he fell.

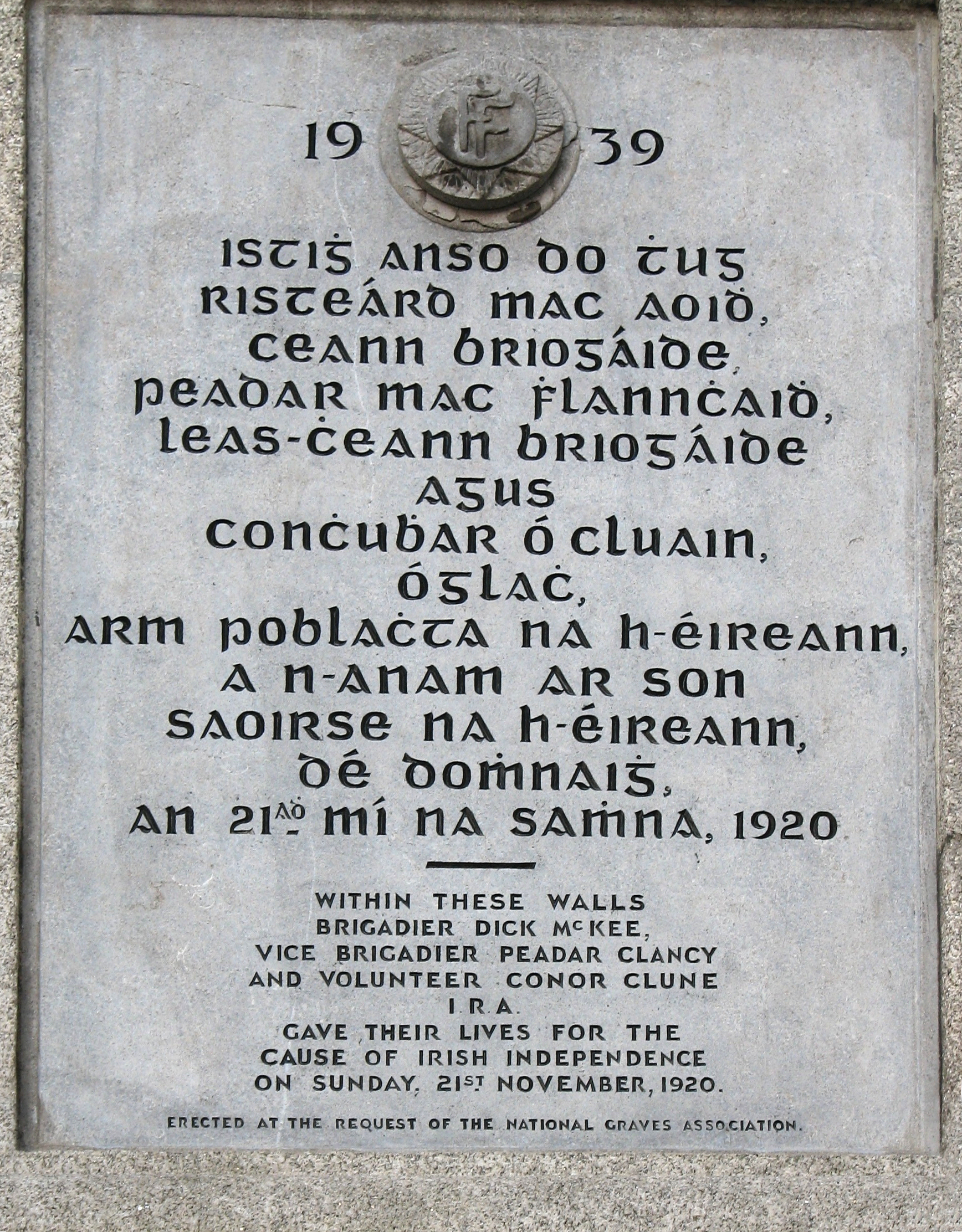
Commemorative plaque in memory of the three Volunteers, erected by the National Graves Association above the door of the guard room at Dublin Castle.

A fourth witness was to tell much the same story.

According to author Seán O'Mahony, the three were tortured in the guardroom to extort from them the names of the volunteers who had earlier that morning shot dead most of the "Cairo Gang". Refusing to talk, they were "subsequently murdered" on the evening of 21 November 1920.

The condition of their bodies when returned by the British authorities to their families supports this assertion. Medical examinations of the three bodies revealed broken bones and abrasions consistent with prolonged assaults and bullet wounds to the head and bodies. There were extensive signs of discolouring. A military doctor claimed that large staining could occur, and this would depend on the way the bodies had been lying. He also said that Clancy had been hit with up to five bullets, which made eight wounds; Dick McKee had three wounds caused by two bullets. He said McKee had no bayonet wounds, but there was a bullet lodged underneath his skin on the right of his chest. Clune, he said, had nine wounds caused by seven bullets. T. Ryle Dwyer also states that David Neligan was adamant that they had not been bayoneted.

His employer Edward McLysaght took charge of the body when the authorities released it. He had the body medically examined. The examination proved that Clune was shot 13 times in the chest. Clune's body was brought home to Co. Clare for burial. His coffin was draped with the Irish flag, but when a British officer objected to it, Canon Slattery, the presiding priest, complied and removed it. He is buried in Quin Abbey near his ancestors. A book titled Death in the Castle: Three murders in Dublin Castle 1920, written by Sean O'Mahony, and published by 1916–1921 Club records both the life and deaths of the three Republicans.

There is a road in Dublin, close to the Phoenix Park called Conor Clune Road and another called Clune Road in Finglas.
