= Hugh Montgomery (Royal Marines officer) =

British first-class cricketer and Royal Marine Light Infantry officer

Personal information
- Full name: Hugh Ferguson Montgomery
- Born: 6 May 1880; Umbala, Haryana, British India
- Died: 10 December 1920 (aged 40); Bray, County Wicklow, Ireland
- Batting: Right-handed
- Bowling: Unknown
- Role: Batsman

Domestic team information
- Years: Team
- 1901–09: Somerset
- 1907–1908: Marylebone Cricket Club (MCC)
- First-class debut: 13 June 1901 Somerset v South Africans
- Last First-class: 31 May 1912 Royal Navy v The Army

Career statistics
Competition	First-class
Matches	17
Runs scored	416
Batting average	13.86
100s/50s	–/1
Top score	50
Balls bowled	456
Wickets	5
Bowling average	53.40
5 wickets in innings	–
10 wickets in match	–
Best bowling	2/17
Catches/stumpings	10/–
- Source: CricketArchive, 28 January 2011

Lieutenant-Colonel Hugh Ferguson Montgomery CMG DSO (6 May 1880 – 10 December 1920) was a British first-class cricketer and Royal Marine Light Infantry officer. Montgomery was born in India and was a cousin of Field Marshal Montgomery. He died as a result of wounds he sustained in the Bloody Sunday assassination of high-ranking British intelligence officers by the Irish Republican Army in the Irish War of Independence.

== Cricket career ==
Montgomery played first-class cricket for Somerset County Cricket Club between 1901 and 1909. He also played a few matches for the Marylebone Cricket Club and one each for the Royal Navy cricket team and a "Gentlemen of England" team; he played in other non-first-class matches for both MCC and the Navy sides.

Montgomery was a middle-order right-handed batsman and an occasional bowler whose bowling style is not known. He was educated at Marlborough College where he played in the annual match at Lord's against Rugby School in both 1897 and 1898. He made his first-class debut in two matches for Somerset in 1901. In the first, against the South Africans he made 1 and 0. He did marginally better a few weeks later with scores of 7 and 8 in the match against Gloucestershire County Cricket Club. He then made irregular appearances for Somerset until 1909, playing more than a couple of matches only in the 1904 season. In this year he made his only score of 50, reaching that exact score when opening the second innings as Somerset lost heavily to Sussex County Cricket Club. It was in 1904 as well that he took his only first-class wickets, five in all, with a best return of two for 17 against Hampshire County Cricket Club.

As well as playing odd games for Somerset, he also appeared in most seasons in a couple of matches for MCC, though none of these matches were first-class until 1907. Similarly, he played for the Royal Navy cricket team against the British Army cricket team from 1908, but the only first-class match in this series he played in was his last first-class match in 1912.

== Military career ==
Montgomery served with the Royal Navy but by 1916 during the First World War he was seconded to the General Staff as a brevet Major serving in the Royal Marine Light Infantry at the Admiralty. In 1917 he was promoted to be a temporary lieutenant-colonel and the citation in the London Gazette records that he has by this time been awarded the Distinguished Service Order medal. His Commonwealth War Graves Commission citation says that he was mentioned in despatches six times.

== Death ==
In 1920, Montgomery was seconded to the British Army Intelligence Corps in Dublin during the Irish War of Independence. He was part of the Cairo Gang, a group of British spymasters whose deaths were ordered by Michael Collins as part of Bloody Sunday. On 21 November 1920, Collins' Twelve Apostles entered Montgomery's lodgings at 28 Pembroke Street and shot him. Montgomery died of his wounds almost three weeks later. He was buried with full military honours at Brompton Cemetery.
