= 1916–1921 Club =

The 1916–1921 Club is an Irish republican commemorative organisation active in Ireland since the 1940s.

The Club organises annual commemorations for the Easter Rising in Arbour Hill, a Roger Casement commemoration in Glasnevin Cemetery, and a Bloody Sunday commemoration remembering the November 1920 murders of Dick McKee, Peadar Clancy, and Conor Clune in Dublin Castle.

Membership of the Club is open to all Irish citizens who subscribe to the objectives and accept the documents upon which it was founded.

== History ==
Founded on 7 December 1942, the motivation for the establishment of the 1916-1921 Club was to heal the divisions of the Irish Civil War. M.W. O’Reilly was the Club’s first President. He took office in 1945 and served for ten years. His successor was Seán McGarry, who had been Tom Clarke’s bodyguard in 1916.

In December 1957, Jack O’Sheehan presented the presidential chain, which has been worn on ceremonial occasions ever since.

The Association of the Old Dublin Brigade, Óglaigh na hÉireann was also open to the surviving members of the War of Independence. The Club incorporated the Association in the early 1980s as their membership declined.

Past Presidents have included Captain James Kelly, Seán MacBride, Ernest Cowan, James Fanning, Jim Doyle, Nora Comiskey, Maire Ui Nuallain, General Michael J. Costello and many veterans of the War of Independence including Commandant Sean Sheridan and Commandant Vincent Byrne. Since 2026, Jack Traynor has been President of the 1916-1921 Club.

== Objectives ==
- To honour and remember the dead who fought for Irish Freedom and all those who worked its achievement.
- To cultivate in our time the spirit of Nationality and Unity that marked the 1916-1921 periods.
- To contribute to the cause of an Ireland — united, independent and sovereign.
- To work for the reconciliation of all Irish people in the context of a united nation, in the belief that it is only such a united people who can effect a lasting and real peace with the British.
- To promote Irish traditions and cultures.

== Society Charter ==
- Proclamation of Easter 1916.
- Declaration of Independence, enacted by Dáil Éireann in 1919.
- Constitution of Ireland (Bunreacht na hÉireann) enacted by the Irish people in 1937.
- Republic of Ireland Act 1948, enacted by the Oireachtas.
- Declaration of Dáil Éireann unanimously adopted in May 1949.

== Publications ==
- Death in the Castle: Three murders in Dublin Castle 1920. Publisher: 1916/1921 Club (this publication records both the life and deaths of Dick McKee, Peadar Clancy and Conor Clune)
- The First Hunger Striker: Thomas Ashe 1917 Sean O Mahony. Publisher: 1916/1921 Club
