= Cranny =

Village in County Clare, Ireland

Cranny An Chrannaigh
- Village
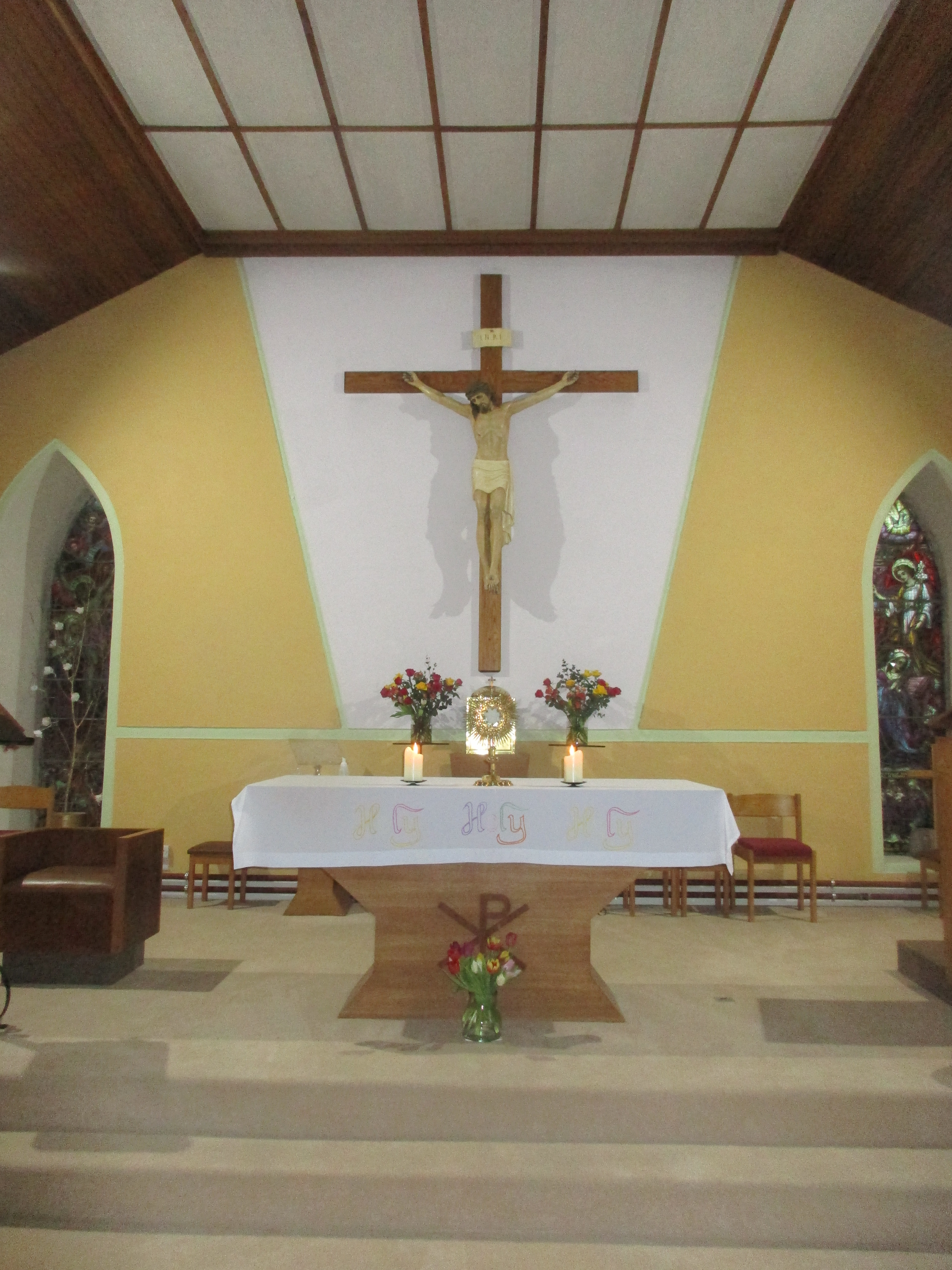
- Altar in St Mary's Church, Cranny

- Location in Ireland
- Coordinates: 52.69287°N 9.22577°W
- Country: Ireland
- Province: Munster
- County: County Clare
- Time zone: UTC+0 (WET)
  - Summer (DST): UTC-1 (IST)
- Irish Grid Reference: Q841518

Cranny (Irish: An Chrannaigh) is a small village in County Clare, Ireland, situated 22 kilometres (14 mi) south-west of Ennis. It lies on the banks of the Cloon River, which flows into the Shannon Estuary at Clonderlaw Bay.

== Etymology ==
There are two claims as to the name of the village. One stems from a bridge of tree trunks across the Cloon River, known as Crownee Bridge. Another stems from an edible dulse known as creathnach, which was distributed as food near Crownee Bridge during the Great Famine, or plants resembling creathnach that grew near the bridge, giving it the Irish name Droichead na Creathnaighe.

While there is no townland near Cranny and no such address the name is listed in the Register of Electors, the name of the village is now well-established. The village is situated in the townland of Carrowreagh, although the official Irish name for Cranny is An Chrannaigh and not An Chrannach, as it was previously.

== History ==
A topographical survey carried out by the Irish Tourist Association in 1943 noted the presence of a Catholic church, a curate's residence, a National School, a creamery, a post office and two pubs in the village.

The village creamery was built in 1931 and officially opened in 1932, but has since been demolished.

== Facilities ==
Cranny Rural Renewal Project was set up in 1997, in an effort to reverse the trend of depopulation and migration and to revitalise the area. A virtual public library, believed at the time to be the first of its kind in the world, was opened in 2003.

Cranny is part of Coolmeen parish, which is part of the Radharc na nOileán pastoral area in the Roman Catholic Diocese of Killaloe. St Mary's Church in the village was constructed in 1832 using funds raised from a crusade across Ireland. The church was renovated in 1880 and 1906, while further renovations were carried out in 1981, when the gallery was removed and the building extended by 16 feet (4.9 m) towards the main road.

The local Gaelic Athletic Association club, Coolmeen GAA, was founded in 1887. It won the Clare Senior Football Championship in 1919 and 1922, as well as the Clare Intermediate Football Championship on three occasions and the Clare Junior Football Championship on six occasions.

Cranny National School is a co-educational primary school under the patronage of the Roman Catholic Diocese of Killaloe. As of 2015, there were 21 students and two teachers in the school.

The post office in the village closed in the 1960s, while there is also a pub and a post box.

TFI Local Link route 337 stops at Cranny National School once a day.

== Notable people ==
- Peadar Clancy, Irish republican

== See also ==
- List of towns and villages in Ireland
