= Frank Teeling =

Member of the IRA (1899–1976)

- Born: Francis Teeling; 10 May 1899; Dublin, Ireland
- Died: 25 January 1976 (aged 76); Dublin, Ireland
- Military career
- Allegiance: Irish Republic (1916–1922); Irish Free State (1922–1923)
- Branch: Irish Republican Army (1916–1922); National Army (1922–1923)
- Rank: Lieutenant (National Army)
- Unit: The Squad (IRA)
- Known for: Member of The Squad
- Conflicts: Irish War of Independence; Irish Civil War

Francis 'Frank' Teeling (10 May 1899 – 25 January 1976) was a member of the Irish Republican Army and one of Michael Collins' Squad who took part in the assassinations of members of the Cairo Gang on Bloody Sunday.

== Background ==
Teeling was a native of Dublin, Ireland. Both the 1901 and 1911 censuses lists him as living at 7 Jane Place Upper. He was one of ten children born to Christopher Teeling and Sarah Mc Grane, only four of whom survived childhood. The 1901 census also lists three children born to Sarah Teeling from a previous marriage.

== Bloody Sunday ==
On 21 November 1920, Teeling was one of a group of IRA men who entered 22 Lower Mount Street to assassinate Lieutenant Angliss, alias McMahon, and Lieutenant Peel. Angliss was shot dead in his bed while Peel, hearing the shots, blocked his bedroom door and survived. When members of Fianna Éireann on lookout reported that Auxiliaries were approaching the house, the unit of Volunteers split up into two groups. One left by the front door, the other left by the laneway at the back of the house. Teeling was wounded in a gun battle with the Auxiliaries in the laneway and arrested. Teeling was the only Bloody Sunday participant to be captured at the scene. He was court martialled in January 1921, was sentenced to hang, and was held at Kilmainham Gaol.

On the night of the 15 February, he escaped from Kilmainham Gaol along with Ernie O'Malley and Simon Donnelly.

== Civil War ==
Although Teeling was made a Lieutenant in the National Army of the newly founded Irish Free State, his behaviour and escalating alcoholism became a cause for concern. He had become an embarrassment to the army, but his record of service during the War of Independence made it awkward to publicly discredit him or discharge him. The commander-in-chief of the National Army complained that Teeling had been "publicly misconducting" himself and "bringing serious discredit on us". In October 1922 he accidentally shot a sergeant major dead in Gormanston camp, County Meath. The subsequent investigation cleared him of any malice in the incident. Plans were made to give him a sum of money in order to encourage him to emigrate to Australia. On 19 March 1923 the Department of Finance made out a cheque to Teeling for the sum of £250. The money was apparently to be drawn down from funds authorised by the Free State cabinet for use by the Secret Service.

However, on 27 March, Teeling shot and killed William Johnson, a member of the Citizens' Defence Force. It seems a drunk Teeling objected to the fact that Johnson had brought a bag of tomatoes into the bar at the Theatre Royal and shot him dead in the ensuing altercation.

At his trial Teeling claimed he had acted in self-defence, citing the fact that Johnson had also drawn his gun. The jury found him guilty of manslaughter and recommended clemency "on account of the state of his mind". Teeling was imprisoned for eighteen months.

== Later life ==
Teeling remained in Ireland, continuing to live at Jane Place Upper. He was imprisoned on at least one further occasion in 1931. He died in January 1976.

== See also ==
- Patrick Moran
