= Bloody Sunday (1920) =

Day of violence in Dublin, Ireland

Bloody Sunday (Irish: Domhnach na Fola) was a day of violence in Dublin on 21 November 1920, during the Irish War of Independence. More than 30 people were killed or fatally wounded.

The day began with an Irish Republican Army (IRA) operation, organised by Michael Collins, to assassinate the "Cairo Gang" – a group of undercover British intelligence agents working and living in Dublin. IRA operatives went to a number of addresses and killed or fatally wounded 15 men. Most were British Army officers, one was a Royal Irish Constabulary (RIC) sergeant, and two were Auxiliaries responding to the attacks. At least two civilians were killed, but the status of some of those killed is unclear. Five others were wounded. The assassinations sparked panic among the British authorities, and many British agents fled to Dublin Castle for safety.

Later that afternoon, British forces raided a Gaelic football match in Croke Park. British RIC members called "Black and Tans", Auxiliaries, and British soldiers, were sent to carry out a cordon and search operation. Without warning, the police opened fire on the spectators and players, killing or fatally wounding 14 civilians and wounding at least 60 others. Three of those killed were children. Some of the police claimed they were fired at, and this was accepted by the British authorities. All other witnesses said the shooting was unprovoked, and a military inquiry concluded it was indiscriminate and excessive. The massacre further turned Irish public opinion against the British authorities. That evening, two Irish republicans (Dick McKee and Peadar Clancy) who had helped plan the earlier assassinations, along with a civilian (Conor Clune) who happened to be caught with the others, were beaten and shot dead in Dublin Castle by their British captors, who said that they were killed during an escape attempt. Two other IRA members were later convicted and hanged in March 1921 for their part in the assassinations.

Overall, the IRA assassination operation severely damaged British intelligence, while the later reprisals increased support for the IRA at home and abroad.

== Background ==
Bloody Sunday was one of the most significant events to take place during the Irish War of Independence, which followed the declaration of an Irish Republic and the founding of its parliament, Dáil Éireann. The Irish Republican Army (IRA) waged a guerrilla war against British forces: the Royal Irish Constabulary and the British Army, who were tasked with suppressing it.

In response to increasing IRA activity, the British government began bolstering the RIC with recruits from Britain, who became known as "Black and Tans" due to their mixture of dark green RIC police and khaki military uniforms. It also formed an RIC paramilitary unit, the Auxiliary Division (or "Auxiliaries"). Both groups soon became notorious for their brutal treatment of the civilian population. In Dublin, the conflict largely took the form of assassinations and reprisals on both sides.

The events on the morning of 21 November were an effort by the IRA in Dublin, under Michael Collins and Richard Mulcahy, to destroy the British intelligence network in the city.

=== Collins's plan ===
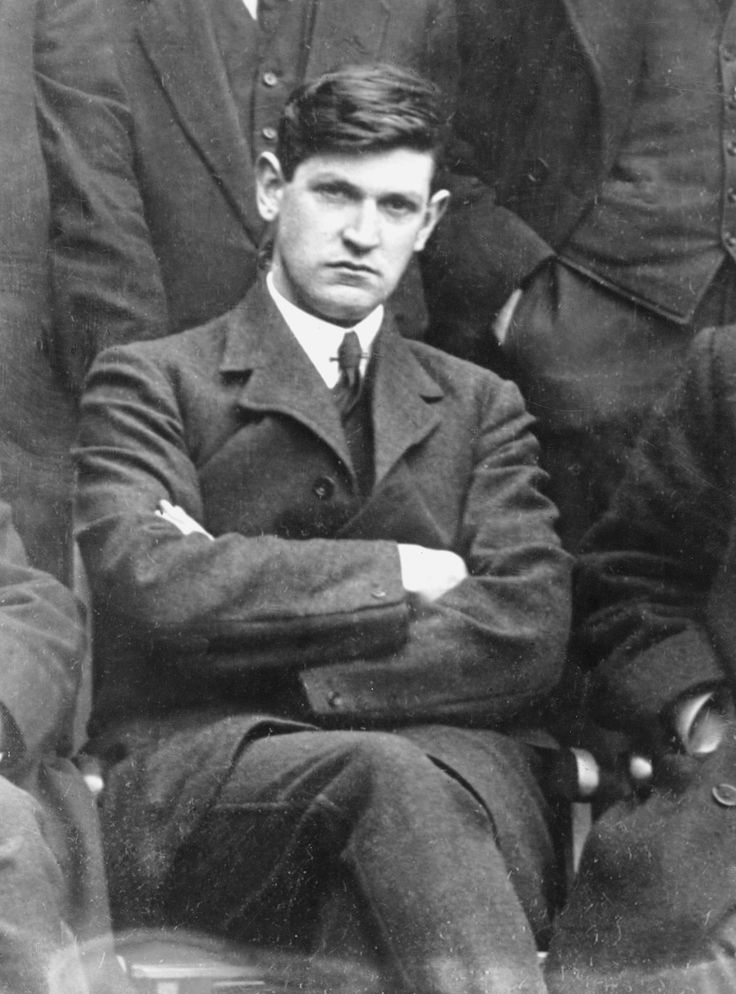
Michael Collins in 1919

Michael Collins was the IRA's Chief of Intelligence and Finance Minister of the Irish Republic. Since 1919 he had operated a clandestine "Squad" of IRA members in Dublin (a.k.a. "The Twelve Apostles"), who were tasked with assassinating prominent RIC officers and British agents, including suspected informers.

By late 1920, British Intelligence in Dublin had established an extensive network of spies and informers around the city. This included eighteen British Intelligence agents known as the "Cairo Gang"; a nickname which came from their patronage of the Cairo Café on Grafton Street and from their service in British military intelligence in Egypt and Palestine during the First World War. Mulcahy, the IRA Chief of Staff, described it as, "a very dangerous and cleverly placed spy organisation".

In early November 1920, some prominent IRA members in Dublin were almost captured. On 10 November, Mulcahy narrowly evaded capture in a raid, but British forces seized documents which included names and addresses of 200 IRA members. Shortly after, Collins ordered the assassination of British agents in the city, judging that if this was not done, the IRA's organisation in the capital would be in grave danger. The IRA also believed that British forces were implementing a coordinated policy of assassination of leading republicans.

Dick McKee was put in charge of planning the operation. The addresses of the British agents were discovered from a variety of sources, including sympathetic maids and other servants, careless talk from some of the British, and an IRA informant in the RIC (Sergeant Mannix) based in Donnybrook barracks.

Collins's plan had initially been to kill more than 50 suspected British intelligence officers and informers, but the list was reduced to thirty-five on the insistence of Cathal Brugha, the Minister for Defence for the Irish Republic, reportedly on the grounds that there was insufficient evidence against some of those named. The number was eventually lowered again, to 20.

On the night of 20 November, the leaders of the assassination teams, which included the Squad and members of the IRA's Dublin Brigade, were briefed on their targets, which included twenty agents at eight different locations in Dublin. Two of those who attended the meeting—Dick McKee and Peadar Clancy—were arrested in a raid a few hours later, and Collins narrowly evaded capture in another raid.

== Bloody Sunday ==
=== Morning: IRA assassinations ===
Bloody Sunday shootings
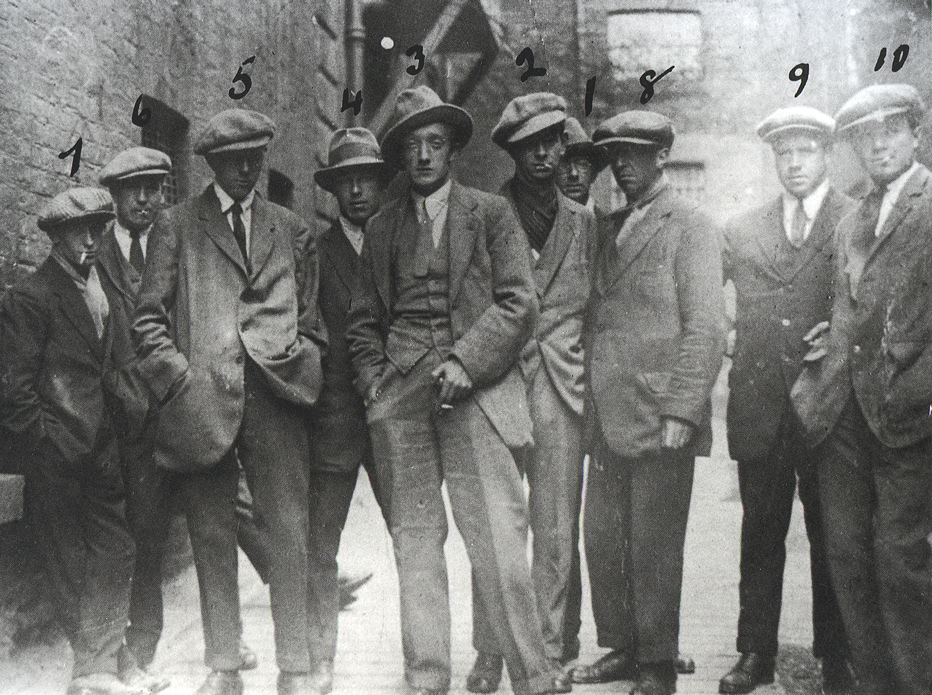
- A photo purportedly of the Cairo Gang, but possibly the Igoe Gang, RIC officers who were brought to Dublin to identify and target IRA men who had moved to the capital from their respective counties.
- Location: central Dublin
- Date: 21 November 1920; Early morning (GMT)
- Attack type: Assassinations
- Weapons: revolvers, semi-automatic pistols
- Deaths: 15: 9 British Army officers; 1 RIC sergeant; 2 Auxiliaries; 2 civilians; 1 uncertain (probably a British agent)
- Injuries: 5
- Perpetrator: Irish Republican Army

Early on the morning of 21 November, the IRA teams mounted the operation. Most of the assassinations occurred within a small middle-class area of south inner-city Dublin, except for two shootings at the Gresham Hotel on Sackville Street (now O'Connell Street). At 28 Upper Pembroke Street, six British Army officers were shot. Two Intelligence officers were killed outright; Lieutenant Colonel Hugh Montgomery, a staff officer, died of his wounds on 10 December; the rest survived. Another successful attack took place at 38 Upper Mount Street, where another two Intelligence officers were killed. A British Army dispatch rider stumbled upon the operation on Upper Mount Street and was held at gunpoint by the IRA. As they left the scene the IRA exchanged fire with a British major who had spotted them from a nearby house.

At 22 Lower Mount Street, one Intelligence officer was killed, but another escaped. A third, surnamed "Peel", managed to keep the assassins from entering his room. The building was then surrounded by members of the Auxiliary Division, who happened to be passing by, and the IRA team was forced to shoot its way out. One IRA volunteer, Frank Teeling, was shot and captured as the team fled the building. In the meantime, two of the Auxiliaries had been sent on foot to bring reinforcements from the nearby barracks. They were captured by an IRA team on Mount Street Bridge and marched to a house on Northumberland Road where they were interrogated and shot dead. They were the first Auxiliaries to be killed on active duty.

At 117 Morehampton Road, the IRA killed a sixth Intelligence officer, but also shot his civilian landlord, presumably by mistake. While at the Gresham Hotel, they killed another two men who were apparently civilians, both of them former British officers who served in the First World War. The IRA team had ordered a hotel porter to take them to specific rooms. In one of them (MacCormack) was apparently not the intended target. The status of the other (Wilde) is unclear. According to one of the IRA team, James Cahill, Wilde told the IRA he was an Intelligence officer when asked his name, apparently mistaking them for a police raiding party.

One of the IRA volunteers who took part in these attacks, Seán Lemass, later became a prominent Irish politician and served as Taoiseach. On the morning of Bloody Sunday, he took part in the assassination of a British court-martial officer at 119 Lower Baggot Street. Another court-martial officer was killed at another address on the same street. At 28 Earlsfort Terrace, an RIC sergeant named Fitzgerald was killed, but apparently the target was a British lieutenant-colonel Fitzpatrick.

There has been confusion and disagreement about the status of the IRA's victims on the morning of Bloody Sunday. At the time, the British government said that the men killed were ordinary British officers or (in some cases) innocent civilians. The IRA were convinced that most of their targets had been British Intelligence agents. In a 1972 article, historian Tom Bowden concluded that "the officers shot by the IRA were, in the main, involved in some aspect of British intelligence". Charles Townshend disagreed: in a response published in 1979, he criticised Bowden's work, while presenting evidence from the Collins Papers to show that "several of the 21st November cases were just regular officers". The most recent research, by Irish military historian Jane Leonard, concluded that, of the nine British officers who were killed, six had been undertaking intelligence work; two had been court-martial officers; another was a senior staff officer serving with Irish Command, but unconnected with military intelligence. One of the two men shot at the Gresham Hotel (Wilde) was probably on secret service, but the other was an innocent civilian, killed because the assassins went to the wrong room.

In all, 14 men were killed outright, and another was mortally wounded, while five others were wounded but survived. Only one Squad member was captured, Frank Teeling, but he managed to escape from jail soon after. Another IRA volunteer was slightly wounded in the hand. IRA volunteer and future Irish politician, Todd Andrews, said later that "the fact is that the majority of the IRA raids were abortive. The men sought were not in their digs or in several cases, the men looking for them bungled their jobs".

Collins justified the killings in this way:

My one intention was the destruction of the undesirables who continued to make miserable the lives of ordinary decent citizens. I have proof enough to assure myself of the atrocities which this gang of spies and informers have committed. If I had a second motive it was no more than a feeling such as I would have for a dangerous reptile. By their destruction the very air is made sweeter. For myself, my conscience is clear. There is no crime in detecting in wartime the spy and the informer. They have destroyed without trial. I have paid them back in their own coin.

List of those killed

- Lieutenant Peter Ames (British Army Intelligence Officer) – Upper Mount Street
- Lieutenant Henry Angliss (cover name 'Patrick McMahon', British Army Intelligence Officer) – Lower Mount Street
- Lieutenant Geoffrey Baggallay (British Army Court-Martial Officer) – 119 Lower Baggot St
- Lieutenant George Bennett (British Army Intelligence Officer) – Upper Mount Street
- Major Charles Dowling (British Army Intelligence Officer) – Pembroke Street
- Sergeant John Fitzgerald (RIC officer) – Earlsfort Terrace
- Auxiliary Frank Garniss (RIC Auxiliary, former British Army lieutenant) – Northumberland Road
- Lieutenant Donald MacLean (British Army Intelligence Officer) – Morehampton Road
- Patrick MacCormack (civilian, former British Army RAVC captain) – Gresham Hotel
- Lieutenant-Colonel Hugh Montgomery (British Army Staff Officer) – Pembroke Street (died on 10 December)
- Auxiliary Cecil Morris (RIC Auxiliary, former British Army captain) – Northumberland Road
- Captain William Newberry (British Army Court-Martial Officer) – 92 Lower Baggot Street
- Captain Leonard Price (British Army Intelligence Officer) – Pembroke Street
- Thomas Smith (civilian, landlord of MacLean) – Morehampton Road
- Leonard Wilde (civilian and possible Intelligence agent, former British Army lieutenant) – Gresham Hotel

=== Afternoon: Croke Park massacre ===
Croke Park massacre
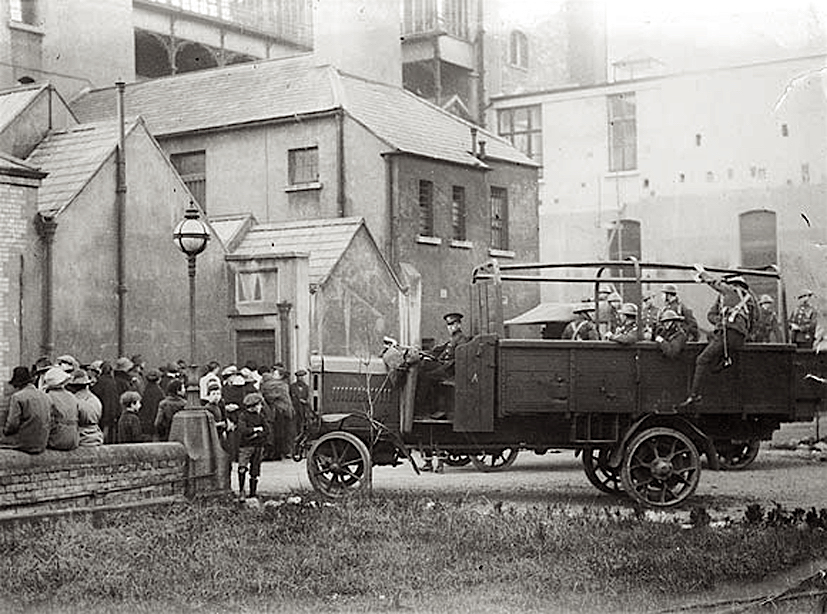
- British soldiers and relatives of the victims outside Jervis Street Hospital during the military inquiry into the Croke Park massacre
- Location: Croke Park, Dublin
- Date: 21 November 1920; 15:25 (GMT)
- Attack type: Mass shooting
- Weapons: Rifles, revolvers and an armoured car
- Deaths: 14 civilians
- Injuries: 80 civilians
- Perpetrators: Royal Irish Constabulary; Auxiliary Division

The Dublin Gaelic football team was scheduled to play the Tipperary team later the same day in Croke Park, the Gaelic Athletic Association's major football ground. Money raised from ticket sales would go to the Republican Prisoners' Dependents' Fund. Despite the general unease in Dublin as news broke of the assassinations, a war-weary populace continued with life. At least 5,000 spectators went to Croke Park for the match, which began thirty minutes late, at 3:15 p.m.

Meanwhile, unbeknownst to the crowd, British forces were approaching and preparing to raid the match. A convoy of troops in trucks and three armoured cars drove in from the north and halted along Clonliffe Road. A convoy of RIC police drove in from the southwest, along Russell Street–Jones's Road. It comprised twelve trucks of Black and Tans in front and six trucks of Auxiliaries behind. Several plain-clothes Auxiliaries also rode in front with the Black and Tans. Their orders were to surround Croke Park, guard the exits, and search every man. The authorities later stated that their intention was to announce by megaphone that all males leaving the grounds would be searched and that anyone leaving by other means would be shot. However, for some reason, shots were fired by police as soon as they reached the southwest gate at the Royal Canal end of Croke Park, at 3:25 pm.

Some of the police later claimed they were fired on first as they arrived outside Croke Park, allegedly by IRA sentries; but other police at the front of the convoy did not corroborate this, and there is no convincing evidence for it. Civilian witnesses all agreed that the RIC opened fire without provocation as they ran into the grounds. Two Dublin Metropolitan Police (DMP) constables on duty near the Canal gate did not report the RIC being fired on. Another DMP constable testified that an RIC group also arrived at the Main gate and began firing in the air. Correspondents for the Manchester Guardian and Britain's Daily News interviewed witnesses, and concluded that the "IRA sentries" were actually ticket-sellers:

It is the custom at this football ground for tickets to be sold outside the gates by recognised ticket-sellers, who would probably present the appearance of pickets, and would naturally run inside at the approach of a dozen military lorries. No man exposes himself needlessly in Ireland when a military lorry passes by.

The police in the convoy's leading trucks appear to have jumped out, run down the passage to the Canal end gate, forced their way through the turnstiles, and started firing rapidly with rifles and revolvers. Ireland's Freeman's Journal reported that

The spectators were startled by a volley of shots fired from inside the turnstile entrances. Armed and uniformed men were seen entering the field, and immediately after the firing broke out scenes of the wildest confusion took place. The spectators made a rush for the far side of Croke Park and shots were fired over their heads and into the crowd.

The police kept shooting for about ninety seconds. Their commander, Major Mills, later admitted that his men were "excited and out of hand". Some police fired into the fleeing crowd from the pitch, while others, outside the grounds, opened fire from the Canal Bridge at spectators who climbed over the Canal Wall trying to escape. At the other side of the Park, soldiers on Clonliffe Road were startled first by the sound of the fusillade, then by the sight of panicked people fleeing the grounds. As the spectators streamed out, an armoured car on St James Avenue fired its machine guns over the heads of the crowd, trying to halt them.

By the time Major Mills got his men back under control, the police had fired 114 rounds of rifle ammunition, while fifty rounds were fired from the armoured car outside the Park. Seven people had been shot to death, and five more had been shot and wounded so badly that they later died; another two people had died in the crowd crush. The dead included Jane Boyle, the only woman killed, who had gone to the match with her fiancé and was due to be married five days later. Two boys aged ten and eleven were shot dead. Two football players, Michael Hogan and Jim Egan, had been shot; Egan survived but Hogan was killed, the only player fatality. There were dozens of other wounded and injured. The police raiding party suffered no casualties.

Once the firing stopped, the security forces searched the remaining men in the crowd before letting them go. The military raiding party recovered one revolver: a local householder testified that a fleeing spectator had thrown it away in his garden. The British authorities stated that 30–40 discarded revolvers were found in the grounds. However, Major Mills stated that no weapons were found on the spectators or in the grounds.

The actions of the police were officially unauthorised and were greeted with horror by the British authorities at Dublin Castle. In an effort to cover up the nature of the behaviour by British forces, a press release was issued which claimed:

A number of men came to Dublin on Saturday under the guise of asking to attend a football match between Tipperary and Dublin. But their real intention was to take part in the series of murderous outrages which took place in Dublin that morning. Learning on Saturday that a number of these gunmen were present in Croke Park, the Crown forces went to raid the field. It was the original intention that an officer would go to the centre of the field and speaking from a megaphone, invite the assassins to come forward. But on their approach, armed pickets gave warning. Shots were fired to warn the wanted men, who caused a stampede and escaped in the confusion.

The Times, which during the war was a pro-Unionist publication, ridiculed Dublin Castle's version of events, as did a British Labour Party delegation visiting Ireland at the time. British Brigadier Frank Percy Crozier, overall commander of the Auxiliary Division, later resigned over what he believed was the official condoning of the unjustified actions of the Auxiliaries in Croke Park. One of his officers told him that "Black and Tans fired into the crowd without any provocation whatsoever". Major Mills stated: "I did not see any need for any firing at all".

List of the Croke Park victims

- Jane Boyle (26), Dublin
- James Burke (44), Dublin
- Daniel Carroll (31), Tipperary (died 23 November)
- Michael Feery (40), Dublin
- Michael 'Mick' Hogan (24), Tipperary
- Tom Hogan (19), Limerick (died 26 November)
- James Matthews (38), Dublin
- Patrick O'Dowd (57), Dublin
- Jerome O'Leary (10), Dublin
- William Robinson (11), Dublin (died 22 November)
- Tom Ryan (27), Wexford
- John William Scott (14), Dublin
- James Teehan (26), Tipperary
- Joe Traynor (21), Dublin

=== Evening: Dublin Castle killings ===
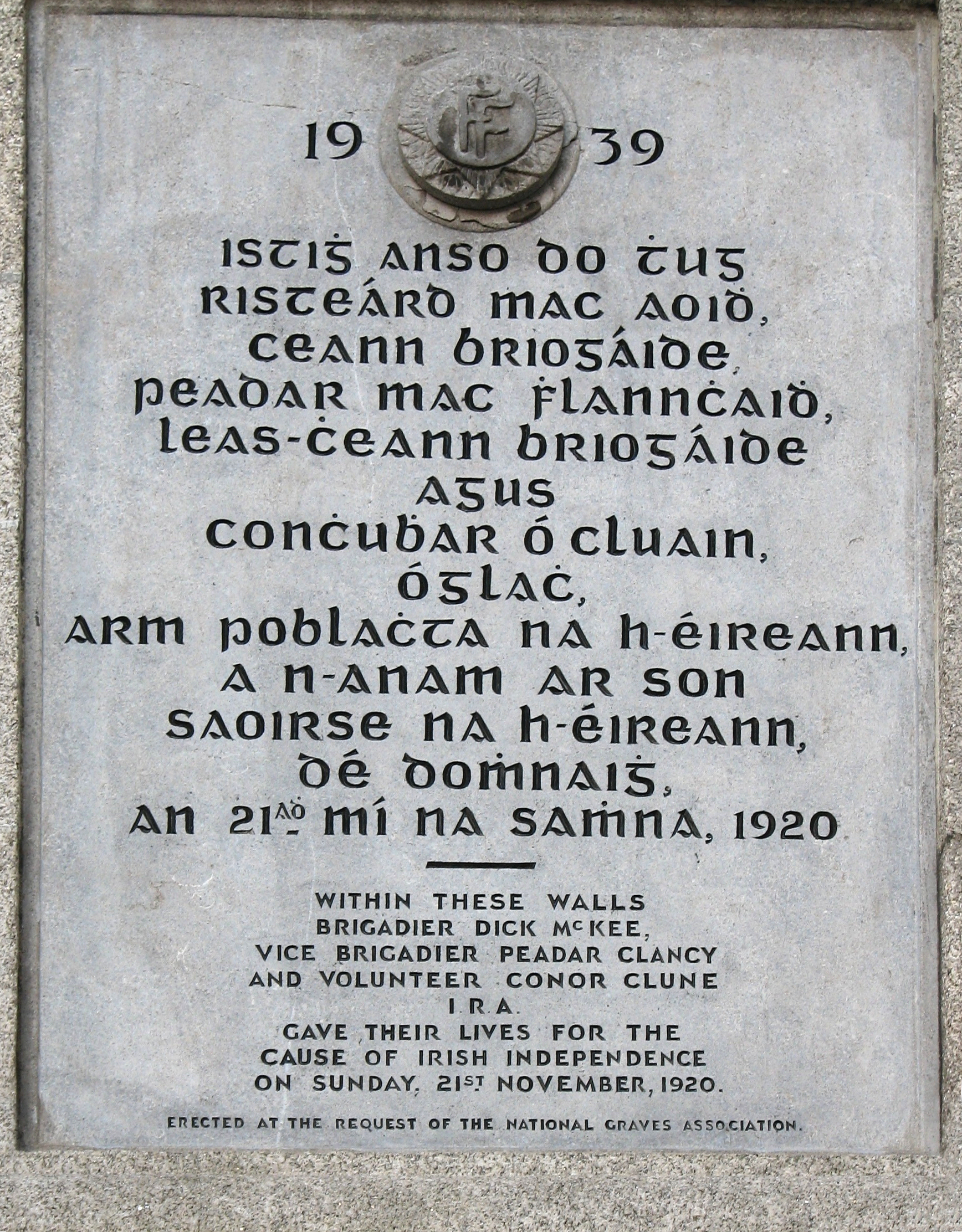
A plaque in memory of the three volunteers at Dublin Castle

Later that night, two high-ranking IRA officers, Dick McKee and Peadar Clancy, together with another man, Conor Clune, were killed while being held and interrogated in Dublin Castle. McKee and Clancy had been involved in planning the assassinations of the British agents, and were captured in a raid hours before they took place. Clune, a member of the Gaelic League, had joined the Irish Volunteers shortly after it was founded, but it is unclear if he was ever active. He had been arrested in another raid on a hotel that IRA members had just left.

Their captors said that, because there was no room in the cells, the prisoners were placed in a guardroom containing arms, and were killed while trying to escape. They allegedly threw grenades, which did not detonate, then fired at the guards with a rifle, but missed. They were shot by Auxiliaries. Medical examination found broken bones and abrasions consistent with prolonged assaults, and bullet wounds to the head and body. Their faces were covered in cuts and bruises, and McKee had an apparent bayonet wound in his side.

Michael Lynch, an IRA Brigade Commander stated that McKee suffered severe beatings prior to being shot to death – "I saw Dick McKee's body afterwards, and it was almost unrecognizable. He had evidently been tortured before being shot...They must have beaten Dick to a pulp. When they threatened him with death, according to reports, Dick's last words were, Go on, and do your worst!"

However, Clune's employer, Edward MacLysaght, who viewed the corpses at King George V Hospital, stated that the claim "that their faces were so battered about as to be unrecognisable and horrible to look at is quite untrue. I remember those pale dead faces as if I had looked at them yesterday, they were not disfigured". An army doctor who examined the bodies found signs of discolouring on the skin, but stated this could have been the result of how the bodies were left lying. He found numerous bullet wounds as did a private doctor hired by Edward MacLysaght, but no signs of any other injuries such as bayoneting. IRA mole David Neligan was also adamant about this fact.

Head of British Intelligence Brigadier General Ormonde Winter carried out his own private investigation, interviewing the guards and inspecting the scene, pronouncing himself happy with their account, noting "One of the rebels was lying on his back near the fireplace, with a grenade in his right hand, and the other two were close by. And on a form in front of the fireplace I found a deep cut that had been made by the spade when it had been used to attack the auxiliary. I extracted the bullet from the door and at once reported to Sir John Anderson who, somewhat dubious of the accuracy of my information, accompanied me to the guardroom. He listened to the statements of the auxiliaries and I was able to show him ocular and tangible proof of them".

== Aftermath ==
Together, the attacks on the British agents, and the British massacre of civilians, damaged British authority and increased support for the IRA. The killings of the match-goers including a woman, two children, and a player, made international headlines, damaging British credibility and further turning the Irish public against the British authorities. Some contemporary newspapers, including the nationalist Freeman's Journal, likened the shootings in Croke Park to the Amritsar massacre, which had taken place in India in April 1919. Later commentators also did likewise.

When Joseph Devlin, an Irish Parliamentary Party Member of Parliament (MP), tried to bring up the Croke Park massacre at Westminster, he was shouted down and physically assaulted by his fellow MPs; the sitting had to be suspended. There was no public inquiry into the Croke Park massacre. Instead, two British military courts of inquiry into the massacre were held behind closed doors, at the Mater Hospital and at Jervis Street Hospital. More than thirty people gave evidence, most of them anonymous Black and Tans, Auxiliaries and British soldiers.

One inquiry concluded that unknown civilians probably fired first, either as a warning of the raid or to create panic. It also concluded: "the fire of the RIC was carried out without orders and exceeded the demands of the situation". Major General Boyd, the British officer commanding Dublin District, added that in his opinion, the firing on the crowd "was indiscriminate, and unjustifiable, with the exception of any shooting which took place inside the enclosure". The findings of these inquiries were suppressed by the British Government, and only came to light in 2000.

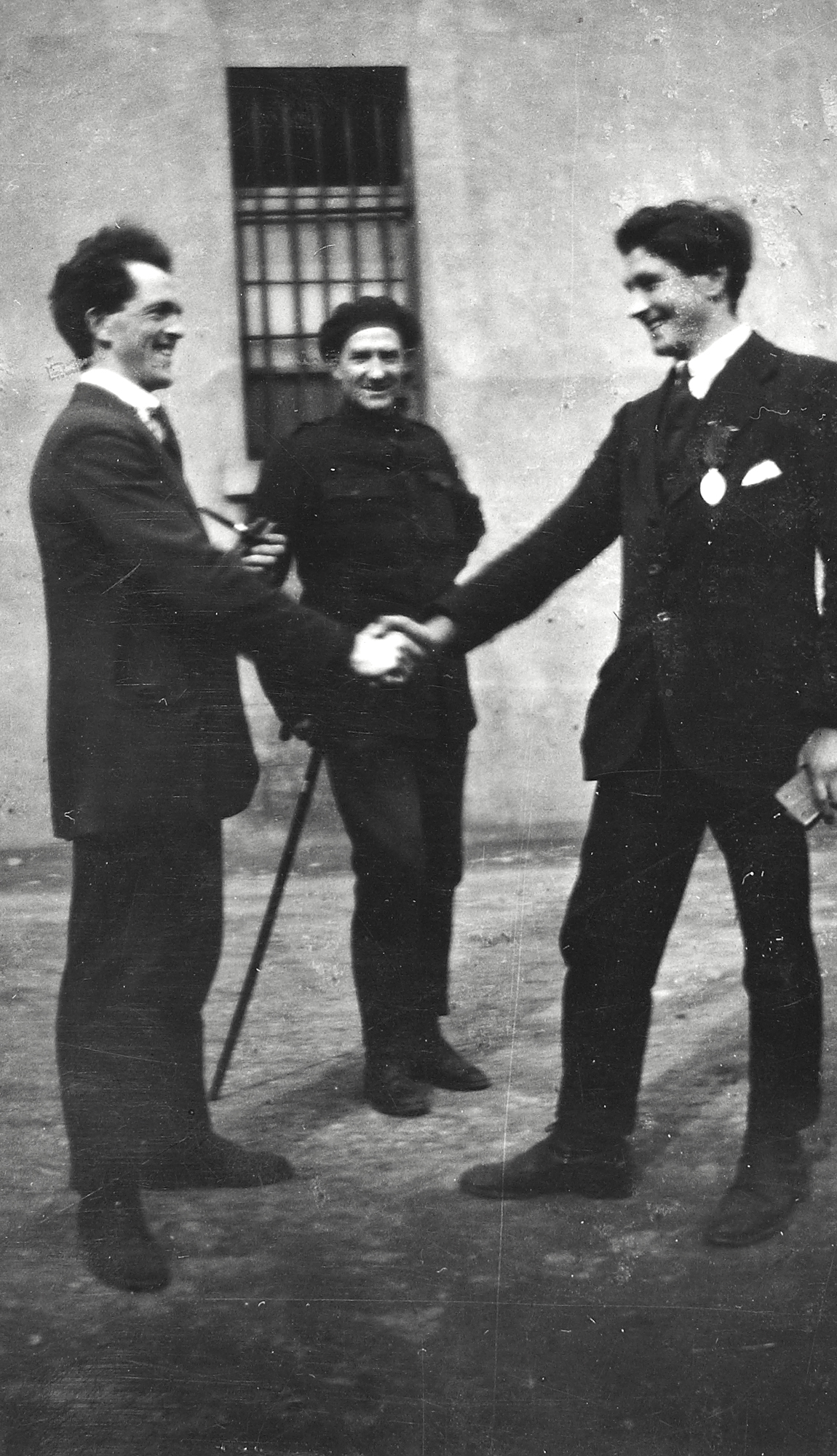
Patrick Moran (left) and Thomas Whelan (right) in Mountjoy Prison, shortly before they were hanged for their part in the assassinations. Between them is an Auxiliary officer.

The IRA assassinations sparked panic among the British military authorities, and numerous British agents fled to Dublin Castle for safety. In Britain and in the short term, the killings of the British Army officers received more attention. The bodies of nine of the Army officers assassinated were brought in procession through the streets of London en route to their funerals. The fate of the British agents was seen in Dublin as an IRA intelligence victory, but British Prime Minister David Lloyd George commented dismissively that his men "got what they deserved, beaten by counter-jumpers". Winston Churchill added that the agents were "careless fellows ... who ought to have taken precautions".

One IRA member was captured during the assassinations that morning, and several others were arrested in the following days. Frank Teeling, who had been captured, was tried for the killing of Lieutenant Angliss along with William Conway, Edward Potter and Daniel Healy. Teeling, Conway and Potter were convicted and sentenced to death.

Teeling escaped from prison and the other two were later reprieved. Thomas Whelan, James Boyce, James McNamara and Michael Tobin were arrested for the killing of Lieutenant Baggallay. Only Whelan was convicted. He was executed on 14 March 1921. Patrick Moran was sentenced to death for Gresham Hotel killings and also executed on 14 March.

The Gaelic Athletic Association (GAA) named one of the stands in Croke Park as the Hogan Stand in memory of Michael Hogan, the football player killed in the incident.

James "Shanker" Ryan, who had informed on Clancy and McKee, was shot and killed by the IRA in February 1921.

IRA assassinations continued in Dublin for the remainder of the war, in addition to more large-scale urban guerrilla actions by the Dublin Brigade. By the spring of 1921, the British had rebuilt their intelligence organisation in Dublin, and the IRA were planning another assassination attempt on British agents in the summer of 1921. Many of these plans were called off because of the truce that ended the war in July 1921.

In March 1921, a 144 page report was issued by the American Commission on Ireland, outlining events then taking place in Ireland - including Bloody Sunday 1920. The report's contributors included a number of US Senators.

== 22 Lower Mount Street trial ==
The trial for the Lower Mount Street killings was held as a Field General Court-martial at City Hall in Dublin, on Tuesday 25 January 1921. The four accused men were William Conway, Daniel Healy, Edward Potter, and Frank Teeling. Daniel Healy was excused by the prosecution and given a separate trial after a petition by counsel that the evidence against the other prisoners would embarrass his client. The trial of the three other prisoners proceeded. They were charged with the murder of Lieutenant H. Angliss of the Royal Inniskilling Fusiliers, otherwise known as Mr McMahon of 22 Lower Mount Street. The whole of Ireland was enthralled by the trial, with most Irish newspapers and international newspapers reporting it.

The prosecution opened with an account of the start of the incident:

At about 9 o'clock two men came to the front door, one of whom asked for Mr. McMahon and the second for Mr. B. The men dashed upstairs and one of them, the prisoner Conway, went to Mr. B.'s room. The other man went to Mr. McMahon's door. The men knocked at the doors, and more men with revolvers came into the house and ran up the stairs. The servant called out to warn Mr. McMahon, and she saw Teeling enter the room followed by others. He called out "Hands up," and Mr. McMahon and a companion occupying the same room were covered with revolvers by five men, two of whom would be identified as Teeling and Potter. Mr B. barricaded his door, and Conway fired shots through it ... Mr. McMahon's companion got under the bed while Mr. McMahon was being shot, and the men left. It was then found that Mr. McMahon was dead, having been wounded in four parts of the body.

Mr "C" was brought forward as a witness on 28 January and was identified as the man sleeping in the same bed who escaped by jumping out the window when the attackers came into the room. Mr "C" was identified as Lieutenant John Joseph Connolly.

Mr "B" was another trial witness, and he was later identified as Lt Charles R. Peel. His description of the incident during the trial was reported in Hansard:

The maid opened the door, twenty men rushed in [the IRA say 11 men], and demanded to know the bedrooms of Mr. Mahon [sic] ... and Mr. Peel. Mr. Mahon [sic]'s room was pointed out. They entered, and five shots were fired immediately at a few inches range. Mr. Mahon [sic] was killed. At the same time others attempted to enter Mr. Peel's room. The door was locked. Seventeen shots were fired through the panels. Mr. Peel escaped uninjured. Meanwhile another servant, hearing the shots, shouted from an upper window to a party of officers of the Auxiliary Division who had left Beggars Bush Barracks to catch an early train southward for duty.

The Irish Independent (26 January 1921) reported that "Cross examined by a witness at the house, Mr. Bewley said 'he did not see Teeling in the house.' He saw him being carried out from the yard. One witness stated that he took the first witness Nellie Stapleton to Wellington Barracks on 17 December. She was put into a corridor in which there 3 or 4 windows covered with brown paper. Eight prisoners were brought out and the lady pointed out Potter. The man who shared McMahons room, Mr. 'C' also identified Potter."

Frank Teeling managed to escape from Kilmainham, in a daring raid organised by Collins.

The Irish Times reported that on 6 March 1921, the death sentences of Conway and Potter were commuted by the Viceroy of Ireland to penal servitude. Daniel Healy was eventually acquitted.

== See also ==
- List of massacres in Ireland
