= Catholic Standard (Ireland) =

Former Irish weekly Roman Catholic newspaper

The Catholic Standard
- Type: Former weekly religious newspaper
- Founded: May 19, 1928
- Ceased publication: April 1978
- Political alignment: Catholic

The Catholic Standard was an Irish weekly Roman Catholic newspaper. It ceased publication in 1978.

The Standard was founded in May 1928 in Dublin, Ireland. It changed its name to the Catholic Standard in July 1963.

Peter O'Curry became editor in 1938. He claimed to have raised the readership from 8,000 to 80,000 a week. During his tenure, writers such as Francis MacManus, Patrick Kavanagh, Benedict Kiely and Gabriel Fallon contributed to the paper. James White (later director of the National Gallery) was arts critic.

During the Second Vatican Council, Michael O'Carroll CSSp commented on the debates and decisions of the council for the newspaper. He also wrote every editorial that appeared in the paper for 14 years.

The paper was known for its support of fascist dictatorships in Spain, Portugal and Italy during the 1930s and 1940s, because it saw them as pro-Church and opposed to Soviet communism.

During the 1960s and 1970s it opposed the Vietnam War and the Arms Race.

During the 1970s the newspaper came under pressure due to costs and falling circulation. The editor from 1971 to 1973 was Donal Mooney, who left for London to join the Irish Post. After him came John Feeney, sacked in 1976. Reporters Jim Doyle and Mary Lawlor were sacked in 1975. Managing Director at the time was Otto Herschan, who controlled property and Catholic papers such as The Catholic Herald in Britain. Board member Father Peter Lemass appealed to the then archbishop of Dublin, Dermot Ryan. He in turn sought help from a number of people, including Paddy McGrath, of the Irish Sweepstake, Eamonn Andrews the TV entertainer and Denis Coakley, the head of Erin Foods, who became board members. Each donated several thousand pounds to save the Standard, with Paddy McGrath contributing at least £30,000.

However internal wrangling and staff dismissals hastened the death of the newspaper, which folded in 1978.
