= The Irish World =

The Irish World refers to two newspapers:

- The Irish World, a late-nineteenth-century paper in New York owned by Patrick Ford (journalist)
- The Irish World (London), 1987–present
