= Michael O'Carroll =

Michael O'Carroll C.S.Sp., was an Irish Spiritan priest, writer, and teacher. Born Michael John Carroll, in Newcastle West, County Limerick on 11 June 1911. His father was a member of the Royal Irish Constabulary.

Educated in Blackrock College, Dublin, the Holy Ghost Novitiate in Kimmage Manor, and at University College Dublin (BA in Philosophy and H. Dip. in Education), O'Carroll spent three years studying theology at the Dominican University of Fribourg in Switzerland, earning a Doctorate in Divinity. O'Carroll went back to teach French, Latin, English, History and Religion in Blackrock College.

A contributor for the Catholic Standard newspaper, O'Carroll wrote every editorial that appeared in the paper for 14 years and during the Second Vatican Council, he commented on the debates and decisions of the Council for the newspaper.

In 1995, O'Carroll was awarded an Honorary Doctorate in Theology by the Pontifical University of Maynooth.

Michael's older brother, Patrick F. O'Carroll, DD, also became a Holy Ghost priest, serving as Provincial of the order, and also worked as a professor in the United States.

O'Carroll was a noted mariologist.

He died on 12 January 2004 after a long illness and was buried in a community grave at Shanganagh Cemetery.

== Publications ==
- "The Holy Ghost Father", Mission Outlook, (1973)
- Medjugorje: Facts, Documents, Theology 1989) ISBN 978-1853900815
- Vassula of the Sacred Heart's Passion (1993) ISBN 0-9519973-3-5
- Bearer of the Light – Vassula, Mediatrix of Divided Christians (1994) ISBN 0-9519973-6-X
- John Paul II – A Dictionary of His Life and Teachings (1994) ISBN 0-9519973-8-6
- A Priest in Changing Times (1998) ISBN 1-85607-229-0
