= Joseph McGrath (Irish politician) =

Irish politician and businessman (1888–1966)

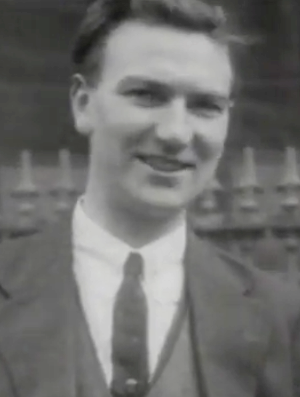
- McGrath in 1922

Minister for Labour
- In office 11 January – 9 September 1922
- Preceded by: Constance Markievicz
- Succeeded by: Patrick Hogan

Minister for Industry and Commerce
- In office 30 August 1922 – 7 March 1924
- Preceded by: Ernest Blythe
- Succeeded by: Patrick McGilligan

Teachta Dála
- In office August 1923 – April 1924
- Constituency: Mayo North
- In office May 1921 – August 1923
- Constituency: Dublin North-West
- In office December 1918 – May 1921
- Constituency: Dublin St James's

Personal details
- Born: 12 August 1888 Dublin, Ireland
- Died: 26 March 1966 (aged 77) Ballsbridge, Dublin, Ireland
- Party: Cumann na nGaedheal
- Other political affiliations: Sinn Féin; National Group
- Spouse: Aileen Downes
- Children: 6, including Patrick

Military service
- Branch/service: Irish Republican Brotherhood; Irish Republican Army; National Army
- Rank: Director of Intelligence
- Battles/wars: Easter Rising; Irish War of Independence; Irish Civil War

Joseph McGrath (12 August 1888 – 26 March 1966) was an Irish politician and businessman. He was a Sinn Féin and later a Cumann na nGaedheal Teachta Dála (TD) for various constituencies; Dublin St James's (1918–1921), Dublin North-West (1921–1923) and Mayo North (1923–1924), and developed widespread business interests.

== Political career ==
British Army military intelligence file for Joseph McGrath

McGrath was born in Dublin in 1888. By 1916 he was working with his brother George at Craig Gardiner & Co., a firm of accountants in Dawson Street, Dublin. He worked with Michael Collins, a part-time fellow clerk and the two struck up a friendship. In his spare time McGrath worked as secretary for the Volunteer Dependents' Fund.

He soon joined the Irish Republican Brotherhood. He fought in Marrowbone Lane in the 1916 Easter Rising. McGrath was arrested after the rising, and jailed in Wormwood Scrubs and Brixton prisons in England. In the 1918 general election, he was elected as Sinn Féin TD for the Dublin St James's constituency, later sitting in the First Dáil. He was also a member of the Irish Republican Army, the guerrilla army of the Irish Republic, and successfully organised many bank robberies during the Irish war of Independence (1919–1921), where a small percentage of the proceeds was retained as a reward by him and his fellow-soldiers. During this time he was interred briefly at Ballykinlar Internment Camp. He escaped by dressing in army uniform and walking out of the gate with soldiers going on leave. He was eventually recaptured and spent time in jail in Belfast.

In October 1921 McGrath travelled with the Irish Treaty delegation to London as one of Michael Collins' personal staff. When the Provisional Government of Ireland was set up in January 1922, McGrath was appointed as Minister for Labour. In the Irish Civil War of 1922–1923, he took the pro-treaty side and was made Director of Intelligence, replacing Liam Tobin. In a strongly worded letter, written in red ink, McGrath warned Collins not to take his last, ill-fated trip to Cork.

He was later put in charge of the police Intelligence service of the new Irish Free State, the Criminal Investigation Department or CID. It was modelled on the London Metropolitan Police department of the same name, but was accused of the torture and killing of a number of republican (anti-treaty) prisoners during the civil war. It was disbanded at the war's end; the official reason given was that it was unnecessary for a police force in peacetime. McGrath went on to serve as Minister for Labour in the Second Dáil and the Provisional Government of Ireland. He also served in the 1st and 2nd Executive Councils as Minister for Industry and Commerce.

In September 1922 McGrath used strikebreakers to oppose a strike by Trade Unionists in the Post Office service, despite having threatened to resign in March of the same year when the government threatened to use British strikebreakers.

In December 1922 McGrath was a reluctant supporter of the government's decision to execute four high-profile IRA prisoners; Liam Mellows, Dick Barrett, Rory O'Connor, and Joe McKelvey.

=== Army Mutiny, Resignation, National Party ===
McGrath resigned from office in April 1924 because of dissatisfaction with the government's attitude to the Army Mutiny officers and as he said himself, "government by a clique and by the officialdom of the old regime". By this he meant that former IRA fighters were being overlooked and that the Republican goals on all Ireland had been sidelined. McGrath and eight other TDs who had resigned from Cumann na nGaedheal then resigned their seats in the Dáil and formed a new political party, the National Group. However, the new party did not contest the subsequent by-elections for their old seats. Instead, Cumann na nGaedheal won seven of the seats and Sinn Féin won the other two.

=== Accusation of involvement in the death of Noel Lemass ===
In 1927, McGrath took a libel case against the publishers of The Real Ireland by poet Cyril Bretherton, a book that claimed McGrath was responsible for the abduction and murder of Noel Lemass (the brother of Seán Lemass) in June 1923 during the civil war, as well as a subsequent coverup. McGrath won the court case. During the 1930s, McGrath and Seán Lemass reconciled and regularly played poker together.

== Business interests ==
Following his political career, he went on to become involved in the building trade. In 1925 he became labour adviser to Siemens-Schuckert, German contractors for the Ardnacrusha hydro-electric scheme near Limerick. McGrath founded the Irish Hospitals' Sweepstake in 1930, and the success of its sweepstakes made him an extremely wealthy man. He had other extensive and successful business interests always investing in Ireland and became Ireland's best-known racehorse owner and breeder, winning The Derby with Arctic Prince in 1951.

== Personal life ==
McGrath died at his home, Cabinteely House in Dublin, on 26 March 1966. Cabinteely House was donated to the state in 1986, and the land developed as a public park. His son Patrick W. McGrath inherited many of his father's business interests, and also served as Fine Gael Senator from 1973 to 1977.

Parliament of the United Kingdom
| New constituency | Member of Parliament for Dublin St James's; 1918–1922 | Constituency abolished |
Oireachtas
| New constituency | Teachta Dála for Dublin St James's; 1918–1921 | Constituency abolished |
Political offices
| Preceded by Constance Markievicz | Minister for Labour; 1922 | Succeeded by Patrick Hogan |
| Preceded by Ernest Blythe | Minister for Industry and Commerce; 1922–1924 | Succeeded by Patrick McGilligan |

| Dáil | Election | Deputy (Party) | Deputy (Party) | Deputy (Party) | Deputy (Party) |
|---|---|---|---|---|---|
| 2nd | 1921 | Philip Cosgrave (SF) | Joseph McGrath (SF) | Richard Mulcahy (SF) | Michael Staines (SF) |
| 3rd | 1922 | Philip Cosgrave (PT-SF) | Joseph McGrath (PT-SF) | Richard Mulcahy (PT-SF) | Michael Staines (PT-SF) |
| 4th | 1923 | Constituency abolished. See Dublin North | | | |

| Dáil | Election | Deputy (Party) | Deputy (Party) | Deputy (Party) | Deputy (Party) | Deputy (Party) |
|---|---|---|---|---|---|---|
| 9th | 1937 | Seán T. O'Kelly (FF) | A. P. Byrne (Ind.) | Cormac Breathnach (FF) | Patrick McGilligan (FG) | Archie Heron (Lab) |
| 10th | 1938 | Seán T. O'Kelly (FF) | A. P. Byrne (Ind.) | Cormac Breathnach (FF) | Patrick McGilligan (FG) | Eamonn Cooney (FF) |
| 11th | 1943 | Seán T. O'Kelly (FF) | A. P. Byrne (Ind.) | Cormac Breathnach (FF) | Patrick McGilligan (FG) | Martin O'Sullivan (Lab) |
| 12th | 1944 | Seán T. O'Kelly (FF) | John S. O'Connor (FF) | Cormac Breathnach (FF) | Patrick McGilligan (FG) | Martin O'Sullivan (Lab) |
| 12th | 1945 by-election | Vivion de Valera (FF) | John S. O'Connor (FF) | Cormac Breathnach (FF) | Patrick McGilligan (FG) | Martin O'Sullivan (Lab) |
| 13th | 1948 | Mick Fitzpatrick (CnaP) | A. P. Byrne (Ind.) | Cormac Breathnach (FF) | 3 seats from 1948 to 1969 | |
| 14th | 1951 | Declan Costello (FG) | A. P. Byrne (Ind.) | Cormac Breathnach (FF) | 3 seats from 1948 to 1969 | |
| 14th | 1952 by-election | Declan Costello (FG) | Thomas Byrne (Ind.) | Cormac Breathnach (FF) | 3 seats from 1948 to 1969 | |
| 15th | 1954 | Declan Costello (FG) | Thomas Byrne (Ind.) | Richard Gogan (FF) | 3 seats from 1948 to 1969 | |
| 16th | 1957 | Declan Costello (FG) | Thomas Byrne (Ind.) | Richard Gogan (FF) | 3 seats from 1948 to 1969 | |
| 17th | 1961 | Declan Costello (FG) | Michael Mullen (Lab) | Richard Gogan (FF) | 3 seats from 1948 to 1969 | |
| 18th | 1965 | Declan Costello (FG) | Michael Mullen (Lab) | Richard Gogan (FF) | 3 seats from 1948 to 1969 | |
| 19th | 1969 | Hugh Byrne (FG) | Jim Tunney (FF) | Richard Gogan (FF) | David Thornley (Lab) | 4 seats from 1969 to 1977 |
| 20th | 1973 | Hugh Byrne (FG) | Jim Tunney (FF) | Richard Gogan (FF) | David Thornley (Lab) | 4 seats from 1969 to 1977 |
| 21st | 1977 | Constituency abolished. See Dublin Finglas and Dublin Cabra | | | | |

| Dáil | Election | Deputy (Party) | Deputy (Party) | Deputy (Party) | Deputy (Party) |
|---|---|---|---|---|---|
| 22nd | 1981 | Jim Tunney (FF) | Michael Barrett (FF) | Mary Flaherty (FG) | Hugh Byrne (FG) |
| 23rd | 1982 (Feb) | Jim Tunney (FF) | Michael Barrett (FF) | Mary Flaherty (FG) | Proinsias De Rossa (WP) |
| 24th | 1982 (Nov) | Jim Tunney (FF) | Michael Barrett (FF) | Mary Flaherty (FG) | Proinsias De Rossa (WP) |
| 25th | 1987 | Jim Tunney (FF) | Michael Barrett (FF) | Mary Flaherty (FG) | Proinsias De Rossa (WP) |
| 26th | 1989 | Jim Tunney (FF) | Michael Barrett (FF) | Mary Flaherty (FG) | Proinsias De Rossa (WP) |
| 27th | 1992 | Noel Ahern (FF) | Róisín Shortall (Lab) | Mary Flaherty (FG) | Proinsias De Rossa (DL) |
| 28th | 1997 | Noel Ahern (FF) | Róisín Shortall (Lab) | Pat Carey (FF) | Proinsias De Rossa (DL) |
| 29th | 2002 | Noel Ahern (FF) | Róisín Shortall (Lab) | Pat Carey (FF) | 3 seats from 2002 |
| 30th | 2007 | Noel Ahern (FF) | Róisín Shortall (Lab) | Pat Carey (FF) | 3 seats from 2002 |
| 31st | 2011 | Dessie Ellis (SF) | Róisín Shortall (Lab) | John Lyons (Lab) | 3 seats from 2002 |
| 32nd | 2016 | Dessie Ellis (SF) | Róisín Shortall (SD) | Noel Rock (FG) | 3 seats from 2002 |
| 33rd | 2020 | Dessie Ellis (SF) | Róisín Shortall (SD) | Paul McAuliffe (FF) | 3 seats from 2002 |
| 34th | 2024 | Dessie Ellis (SF) | Rory Hearne (SD) | Paul McAuliffe (FF) | 3 seats from 2002 |

| Dáil | Election | Deputy (Party) | Deputy (Party) | Deputy (Party) | Deputy (Party) |
|---|---|---|---|---|---|
| 4th | 1923 | P. J. Ruttledge (Rep) | Henry Coyle (CnaG) | John Crowley (Rep) | Joseph McGrath (CnaG) |
| 4th | 1924 by-election | P. J. Ruttledge (Rep) | John Madden (Rep) | John Crowley (Rep) | Joseph McGrath (CnaG) |
| 4th | 1925 by-election | P. J. Ruttledge (Rep) | John Madden (Rep) | John Crowley (Rep) | Michael Tierney (CnaG) |
| 5th | 1927 (Jun) | P. J. Ruttledge (FF) | John Madden (SF) | Michael Davis (CnaG) | Mark Henry (CnaG) |
| 6th | 1927 (Sep) | P. J. Ruttledge (FF) | Micheál Clery (FF) | Michael Davis (CnaG) | Mark Henry (CnaG) |
| 7th | 1932 | P. J. Ruttledge (FF) | Micheál Clery (FF) | Michael Davis (CnaG) | Patrick O'Hara (CnaG) |
| 8th | 1933 | P. J. Ruttledge (FF) | Micheál Clery (FF) | Michael Davis (CnaG) | James Morrisroe (CnaG) |
| 9th | 1937 | P. J. Ruttledge (FF) | John Munnelly (FF) | Patrick Browne (FG) | 3 seats 1937–1969 |
| 10th | 1938 | P. J. Ruttledge (FF) | John Munnelly (FF) | Patrick Browne (FG) | 3 seats 1937–1969 |
| 11th | 1943 | P. J. Ruttledge (FF) | James Kilroy (FF) | Patrick Browne (FG) | 3 seats 1937–1969 |
| 12th | 1944 | P. J. Ruttledge (FF) | James Kilroy (FF) | Patrick Browne (FG) | 3 seats 1937–1969 |
| 13th | 1948 | P. J. Ruttledge (FF) | James Kilroy (FF) | Patrick Browne (FG) | 3 seats 1937–1969 |
| 14th | 1951 | P. J. Ruttledge (FF) | Thomas O'Hara (CnaT) | Patrick Browne (FG) | 3 seats 1937–1969 |
| 14th | 1952 by-election | Phelim Calleary (FF) | Thomas O'Hara (CnaT) | Patrick Browne (FG) | 3 seats 1937–1969 |
| 15th | 1954 | Phelim Calleary (FF) | Thomas O'Hara (CnaT) | Patrick Lindsay (FG) | 3 seats 1937–1969 |
| 16th | 1957 | Phelim Calleary (FF) | Seán Doherty (FF) | Patrick Lindsay (FG) | 3 seats 1937–1969 |
| 17th | 1961 | Phelim Calleary (FF) | Joseph Lenehan (Ind.) | Michael Browne (FG) | 3 seats 1937–1969 |
| 18th | 1965 | Phelim Calleary (FF) | Patrick Lindsay (FG) | Thomas O'Hara (FG) | 3 seats 1937–1969 |
| 19th | 1969 | Constituency abolished. See Mayo East and Mayo West | | | |
