= Patrick W. McGrath =

Irish politician (1927–2001)

Senator
- In office 1 June 1973 – 27 October 1977
- Constituency: Nominated by the Taoiseach

Personal details
- Born: 12 February 1927 Dublin, Ireland
- Died: 9 October 2001 (aged 74) Dublin, Ireland
- Party: Fine Gael
- Spouse: Anna Burke (m. 1951)
- Children: 4
- Parent: Joseph McGrath (father)

Patrick William McGrath (12 February 1927 – 9 October 2001) was an Irish Fine Gael politician. He was a member of Seanad Éireann from 1973 to 1977. He was nominated by the Taoiseach to the 13th Seanad in 1973. He did not contest the 1977 Seanad election.

His father Joseph McGrath was served as a Sinn Féin and Cumann na nGaedheal TD for Dublin and Mayo constituencies. He also travelled with the delegation to the Anglo-Irish treaty talks.

A businessman who inherited his role in many business including Irish Glass Bottle Company, Waterford Crystal and Irish Hospital Trust. He also was involved in publishing catholic newspapers, as director of the Catholic Herald from 1974 and The Irish Catholic from 1980. McGrath also funded The Catholic Standard when it was in financial trouble, shortly before its closure.
