= Donal Mooney =

Irish journalist

Donal Mooney was an Irish journalist and editor.

Born in Nenagh, County Tipperary, he grew up in Abbeyleix, County Laois and in Rathmines, Dublin. He was educated at Belvedere College, Dublin, and went to University College Dublin, graduating in English and Commerce.

He first worked as journalist for The Hibernia Magazine. Mooney edited The Catholic Standard from 1971 until 1973, when he moved to the UK, and worked for The Irish Post, which he also became editor of. In later years he edited The Irish World newspaper in Britain.

He died aged 63, in 2004 after a long illness.
