= Béal na Bláth =

Village in County Cork, Ireland

- Village
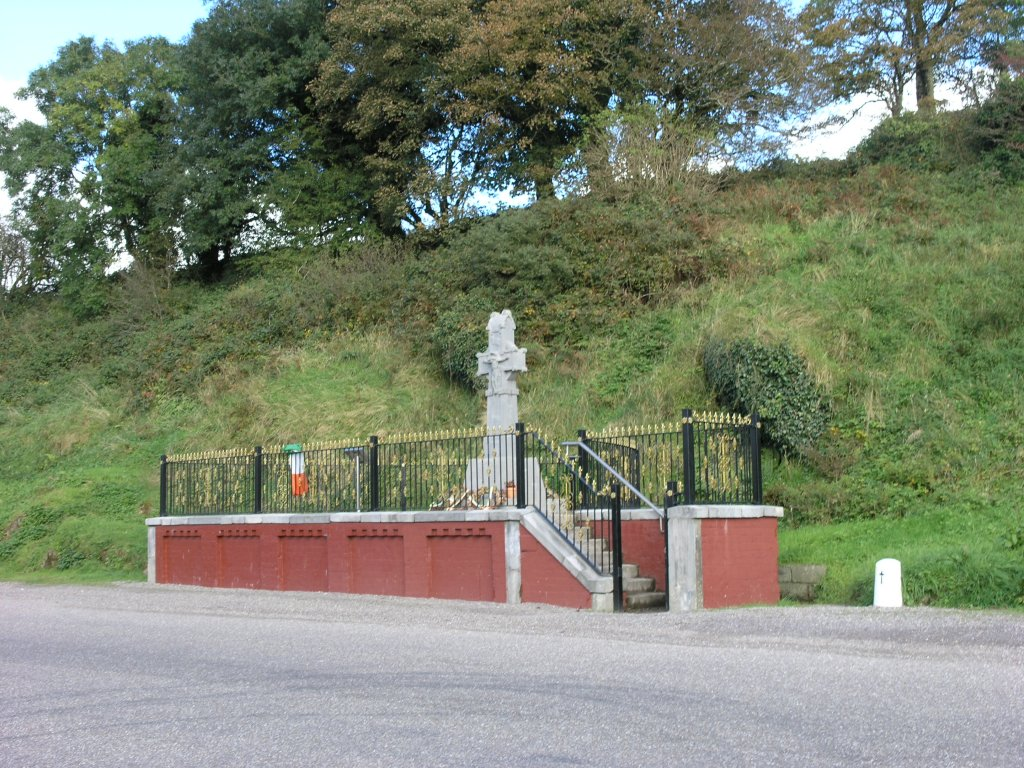
- Cross commemorating where Michael Collins was killed nearby in August 1922

- Location in County Cork
- Coordinates: 51.821751°N 8.855673°W
- Country: Ireland
- Province: Munster
- County: County Cork

Béal na Bláth or Béal na Blá (anglicised Bealnablath or Bealnabla) is a small village on the R585 road in County Cork, Ireland. The area is best known as the site of the ambush and death of the Irish revolutionary leader Michael Collins in 1922.

== Name ==
The original version of the name has become obscured with the passage of time. The Placenames Database of Ireland gives the official spelling as Béal na Blá, with the alternative Béal na Bláth considered not to be supported by the linguistic evidence. The two anglicisations are 'Bealnabla' and 'Bealnablath'. Béal means "mouth/opening/approach". The meaning of blá in this placename has been asserted by academic authorities to mean "pasture-land", "good land", "green" or "lawn", while bláth can mean "blossom" or "buttermilk". Béal na Blá would therefore mean "the entrance to the good land", most likely referring to an area of land adjacent to the nearby River Bride.

The spelling Béal na mBláth (meaning "mouth of the flowers") is commonly used, but does not fit with the pronunciation used by the last native Irish-language speakers in the area (who survived until the 1940s), nor does it accord with the historical record. This spelling of the name, and the associated translation, most likely arose through folk etymology among non-native speakers. Another suggested reconstruction of the original name is Béal Átha na Bláiche, meaning "mouth of the ford of the buttermilk", by analogy to a similar placename in County Limerick.

== Michael Collins ==
On 22 August 1922, during the Irish Civil War, Michael Collins, Chairman of the Provisional Government and Commander-in-chief of the National Army, was killed in an ambush near Béal na Bláth by anti-treaty IRA forces while travelling in convoy from Bandon. The ambush was planned in a farmhouse in the village close to The Diamond Bar. Commemorations are held on the nearest Sunday to the anniversary of his death. A memorial cross (coordinates 51.81356°N 8.85651°W) stands 1 km south of the village near the site of the shooting in the townland of Glannarogue (Irish: Gleann na Ruaige), on a local road which was a dirt road when Collins was shot. It does not mark the actual spot where Collins fell, which was further south and on the left-hand side of the road heading north.
