= James White (art expert) =

Irish art expert and author

- Born: 16 September 1913; Dublin, Ireland
- Died: 3 June 2003 (aged 89)
- Occupation: Art expert

James White (16 September 1913 – 2 June 2003) was an Irish art expert and author. He contributed many articles on art to Irish newspapers and was Director of the National Gallery of Ireland from 1964 to 1980.

== Biography ==
White was born in Dublin, Ireland. While still a teenager he started work at the John Player tobacco factory on the South Circular Road. He became a manager and was employed there for 31 years.

He studied art in his spare time and in the 1940s started contributing art reviews to the Irish Catholic Standard. He became art critic for the Irish Press in the 1950s and later worked for the Irish Times. He became director of the National Gallery in 1964, a post he held until his retirement in 1980. White replaced Thomas MacGreevy, who retired as director of the National Gallery in 1963.

He wrote a number of books on art and artists, and in 1968 published a book-length illustrated guide to the National Gallery of Ireland.
