= Michael Collins (Irish leader) =

Irish revolutionary and politician (1890–1922)

- Mícheál Ó Coileáin
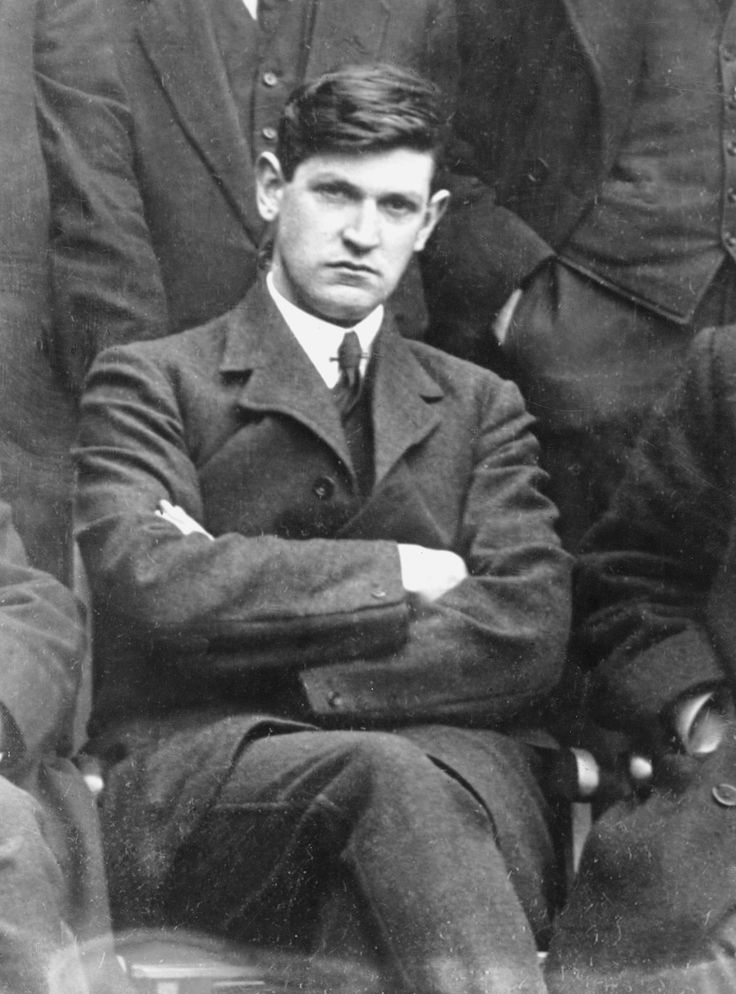
- Collins in 1919

Chairman of the Provisional Government
- In office 16 January – 22 August 1922
- Preceded by: Office established
- Succeeded by: W. T. Cosgrave

Minister for Finance
- In office 2 April 1919 – 22 August 1922
- Preceded by: Eoin MacNeill
- Succeeded by: W. T. Cosgrave

Minister for Home Affairs
- In office 22 January – 1 April 1919
- Preceded by: Office established
- Succeeded by: Arthur Griffith

Teachta Dála
- In office May 1921 – August 1922
- Constituency: Cork Mid, North, South, South East and West
- In office December 1918 – May 1921
- Constituency: Cork South

President of the Irish Republican Brotherhood
- In office November 1920 – 22 August 1922
- Preceded by: Patrick Moylett
- Succeeded by: Richard Mulcahy

Personal details
- Born: 16 October 1890 Woodfield, Clonakilty, County Cork, Ireland
- Died: 22 August 1922 (aged 31) Béal na Bláth, County Cork, Ireland
- Resting place: Glasnevin Cemetery, Dublin
- Party: Sinn Féin (pro-treaty faction)
- Relatives: Margaret Collins-O'Driscoll (sister); Nora Owen (grandniece); Mary Banotti (grandniece)
- Nickname: The Big Fellow

Military service
- Allegiance: Irish Republic; Irish Free State
- Service: Irish Volunteers; Irish Republican Army; National Army
- Years of service: 1914–1922
- Rank: General
- Commands: Adjutant-General (1918); Director of Intelligence (IRA); Commander-in-Chief (National Army)
- Conflicts: Easter Rising; Irish War of Independence; Irish Civil War †

Michael Collins (Irish: Mícheál Ó Coileáin; 16 October 1890 – 22 August 1922) was an Irish revolutionary, soldier and politician who was a leading figure in the early-20th century struggle for Irish independence. During the War of Independence he was Director of Intelligence of the Irish Republican Army (IRA). He served in the government of the Irish Republic as the Minister for Home Affairs and later as the Minister for Finance. Collins was Chairman of the Provisional Government of the Irish Free State from January 1922 and commander-in-chief of the National Army from July until he died in an ambush in August 1922, during the Irish Civil War.

Collins was born in Woodfield, County Cork, the youngest of eight children. He moved to London in 1906 to become a clerk in the Post Office Savings Bank at Blythe House. He was a member of the London GAA, through which he became associated with the Irish Republican Brotherhood and the Gaelic League. He returned to Ireland in January 1916 and fought in the Easter Rising. He was taken prisoner and held in the Frongoch internment camp as a prisoner of war, but he was released in December 1916.

Collins subsequently rose through the ranks of the Irish Volunteers and Sinn Féin. He was elected as MP for South Cork in December 1918. Sinn Féin's elected members (later known as TDs) formed an Irish parliament, the First Dáil, in January 1919 and declared the independence of the Irish Republic. Collins was appointed Minister for Finance. In the ensuing War of Independence, he was Director of Organisation and Adjutant General for the Irish Volunteers, later Director of Intelligence of the IRA. He gained fame as a guerrilla warfare strategist, planning many successful attacks on British forces together with the Squad, such as the "Bloody Sunday" assassinations of key British intelligence agents in November 1920.

After the July 1921 ceasefire Collins was one of five plenipotentiaries sent by the Dáil cabinet to negotiate peace terms in London. The resulting Anglo-Irish Treaty, signed in December 1921, would establish the Irish Free State but depended on an oath of allegiance to the Crown. De Valera and other republican leaders found this clause of the treaty most difficult to accept. Collins viewed the treaty as offering "the freedom to achieve freedom", and he helped persuade a majority of the Dáil to ratify the Treaty. A provisional government was formed under his chairmanship in early 1922. During this time he secretly provided support for an IRA offensive in Northern Ireland. It was soon disrupted by the Irish Civil War, in which Collins was commander-in-chief of the National Army. He was shot and killed in an ambush by anti-Treaty forces in August 1922 at Beal na Blatha, County Cork.

== Early years ==
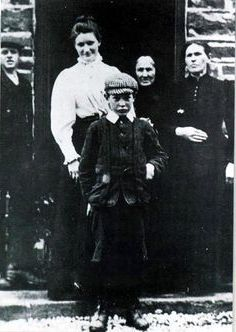
Michael Collins aged 10–11 at newly built Woodfield House

Collins was born in Woodfield, Sam's Cross, near Rosscarbery, County Cork, on 16 October 1890, (Note: His gravestone in Glasnevin Cemetery erroneously gives his birth date as 12 October 1890.) the third son and youngest of eight children. His father, Michael John (1815–1897), was a farmer and amateur mathematician, who had been a member of the Irish Republican Brotherhood (IRB). The elder Collins was 60 years old when he married Mary Anne O'Brien, then 23, in 1876. The marriage was apparently happy. They brought up eight children on a 90-acre (36 ha) farm called Woodfield, which the Collins family had held as tenants for several generations. Michael was six and a half years old when his father died. After the death of her husband, Mary Anne had the small family home rebuilt in 1899–1900 as Woodfield House, a much larger dwelling. Michael Collins (the younger) believed his family were descendants of the Uí Chonaill Gabra.

He was a bright and precocious child with a fiery temper and a passionate feeling of Irish patriotism. He named a local blacksmith, James Santry, and his headmaster at Lisavaird National School, Denis Lyons, as the first nationalists to personally inspire his "pride of Irishness". Lyons was a member of the IRB, while Santry's family had participated in, and forged arms for, the rebellions of 1798, 1848 and 1867. There are a number of anecdotal explanations for the origin of his nickname "the Big Fellow". His family claim that he was called this as a child, as a term of endearment for an adventurous and bold youngest brother. The nickname was established in his teens, long before he became a political or military leader.

At the age of thirteen he attended Clonakilty National School. During the week he stayed with his sister Margaret Collins-O'Driscoll and her husband Patrick O'Driscoll, while at weekends he returned to the family farm. Patrick O'Driscoll founded the newspaper West Cork People and Collins helped out with general reporting and preparing the issues.

Leaving school at fifteen, Collins took the British Civil Service examination in Cork in February 1906 and moved to the home of his sister Hannie in London, where he became a boy clerk in the Post Office Savings Bank at Blythe House. In 1910 he became a messenger at a London firm of stockbrokers, Horne and Company. While living in London he studied law at King's College London but did not finish. He joined the London GAA and, through this, the IRB. Sam Maguire, a republican from Dunmanway, County Cork, introduced the 19-year-old Collins to the IRB. In 1915 he moved to work in the Guaranty Trust Company of New York where he remained until his return to Ireland the following year joining part-time Craig Gardiner & Co, a firm of accountants in Dawson Street, Dublin.

== Easter Rising ==
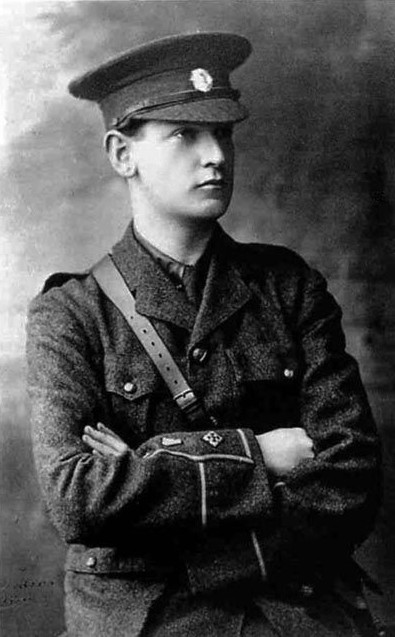
Collins in Irish Volunteer uniform

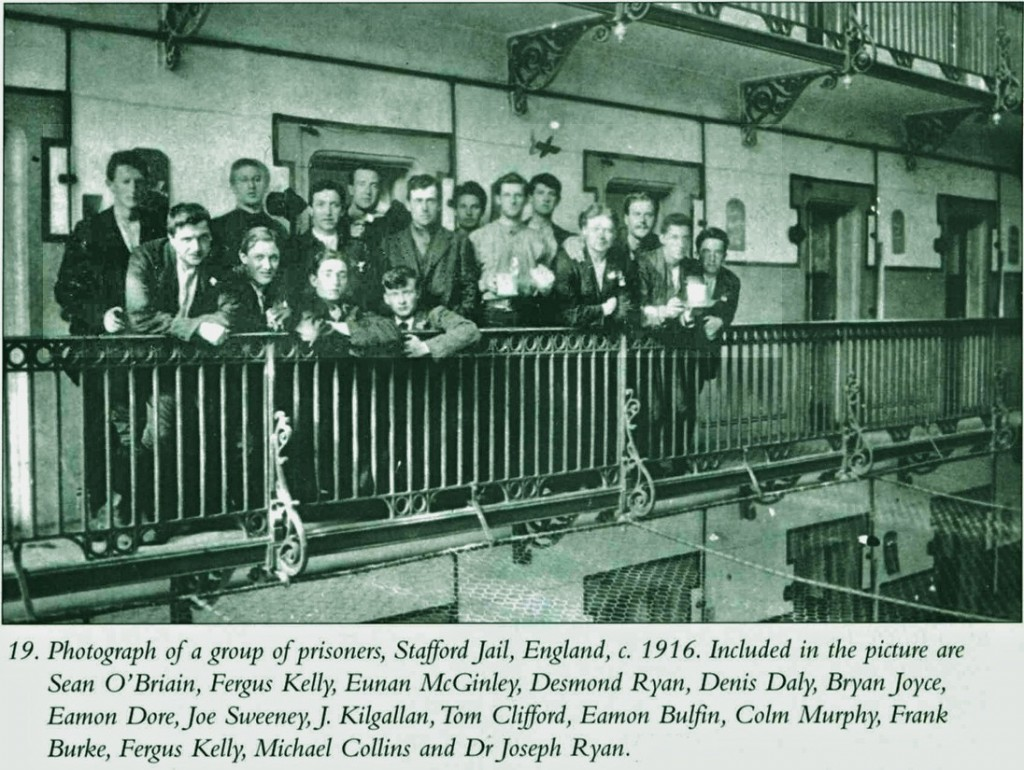
Captured Irish soldiers in Stafford Gaol after the failed Easter Rising. Collins is fifth from the right with an 'x' over his head.

The struggle for Home Rule, along with labour unrest, had led to the formation in 1913 of two major nationalist paramilitary groups which later launched the Easter Rising: the Irish Citizen Army was established by James Connolly, James Larkin and his Irish Transport and General Workers Union to protect strikers from the Dublin Metropolitan Police during the 1913 Dublin Lockout. The Irish Volunteers were created in the same year by nationalists in response to the formation of the Ulster Volunteers, an Ulster loyalist body pledged to oppose Home Rule by force.

An organiser of considerable intelligence, Collins had become highly respected in the IRB. This led to his appointment as financial advisor to Count Plunkett, father of one of the Easter Rising's organisers, Joseph Plunkett. Collins took part in preparing arms and drilling troops for the insurrection.

The Rising was Collins's first appearance in national events. When it commenced on Easter Monday 1916, Collins served as Joseph Plunkett's aide-de-camp and bodyguard at the rebellion's headquarters in the General Post Office (GPO) in Dublin. There he fought alongside Patrick Pearse, James Connolly and other members of the Rising leadership. The Rising was put down after six days, but the insurgents achieved their goal of holding their positions for the minimum time required to justify a claim to independence under international criteria.

Following the surrender, Collins was arrested and taken into British custody. He was processed at Dublin's Richmond Barracks by "G-Men", plain-clothes officers from Dublin Metropolitan Police. During his screening, Collins was identified as someone who should be selected for further interrogation, harsher treatment or execution. However, he overheard his name being called out so he moved to the other side of the building to identify the speaker. In doing so, he joined the group that was later transferred to Frongoch internment camp in Wales after two months captivity in Stafford Gaol. Historian Tim Pat Coogan describes Collins's fortuitous move across the detention room in Richmond Barracks as "one of the luckiest escapes of his life".

Collins first began to emerge as a major figure in the vacuum created by the executions of the 1916 leadership. He began hatching plans for "next time" even before the prison ships left Dublin.

At Frongoch he was one of the organisers of a programme of protest and non-cooperation with authorities. The camp proved an excellent opportunity for networking with physical-force republicans from all over the country, of which he became a key organiser.

While some celebrated the fact that a rising had happened at all, believing in Pearse's theory of "blood sacrifice" (namely that the deaths of the Rising's leaders would inspire others), Collins railed against the military blunders made. He cited the seizure of indefensible and very vulnerable positions like St Stephen's Green which were impossible to escape from and difficult to supply. Public outcry placed pressure on the British government to end the internment and, in December 1916, the Frongoch prisoners were sent home.

== 1917–18 ==
Before his execution, Tom Clarke, first signatory of the 1916 Proclamation and widely considered the Rising's foremost organiser, had designated his wife Kathleen Clarke as the official caretaker of Rising official business, in the event that the leadership did not survive. By June 1916, Mrs. Clarke had sent out the first post-Rising communiqué to the IRB, declaring the Rising to be only the beginning and directing nationalists to prepare for "the next blow". Soon after his release, Mrs. Clarke appointed Collins Secretary to the National Aid and Volunteers Dependents Fund and subsequently passed on to him the secret organisational information and contacts which she had held in trust for the independence movement.

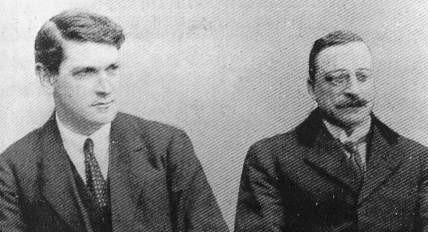
Michael Collins and Arthur Griffith

Collins became one of the leading figures in the post-Rising independence movement spearheaded by Arthur Griffith, editor and publisher of the main nationalist newspaper The United Irishman, which Collins had read avidly as a boy. Griffith's organisation Sinn Féin was founded in 1905 as an umbrella group to unify all the various factions within the nationalist movement.

Under Griffith's policy, Collins and other advocates of the "physical-force" approach to independence gained the cooperation of Sinn Féin, while agreeing to disagree with Griffith's moderate ideas of a dual monarchy solution based on the Hungarian model. The British government and mainstream Irish media had wrongly blamed Sinn Féin for the Rising. This attracted Rising participants to join the organisation in order to exploit the reputation with which such British propaganda had imbued the organisation. By October 1917 Collins had risen to become a member of the executive of Sinn Féin and director of organisation for the Irish Volunteers. Éamon de Valera, another veteran of 1916, stood for the presidency of Sinn Féin against Griffith, who stepped aside and supported de Valera's presidency.

== First Dáil ==
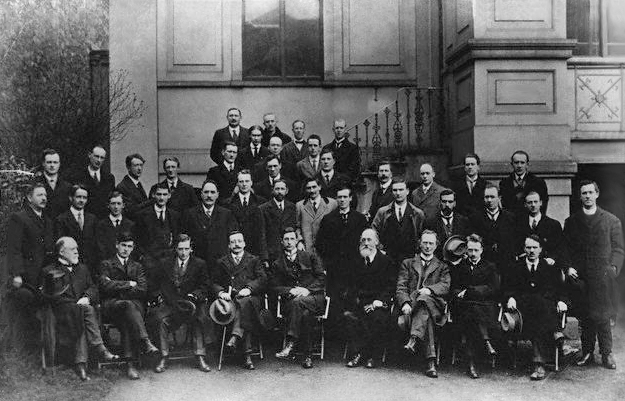
Members of the First Dáil First row (l–r): Laurence Ginnell, Michael Collins, Cathal Brugha, Arthur Griffith, Éamon de Valera, Count Plunkett, Eoin MacNeill, W. T. Cosgrave, Kevin O'Higgins (third row, right)

In the 1918 general election Sinn Féin swept the polls throughout much of Ireland, with many seats uncontested, and formed an overwhelming parliamentary majority in Ireland. Like many senior Sinn Féin representatives Collins was elected as an MP (for Cork South) with the right to sit in the House of Commons of the United Kingdom in London. Unlike their rivals in the Irish Parliamentary Party, Sinn Féin MPs had announced that they would not take their seats in Westminster but instead would set up an Irish Parliament in Dublin.

Before the new body's first meeting, Collins, tipped off by his network of spies, warned his colleagues of plans to arrest all its members in overnight raids. De Valera and others ignored the warnings on the argument that, if the arrests happened, they would constitute a propaganda coup. The intelligence proved accurate and de Valera, along with Sinn Féin MPs who followed his advice, were arrested; Collins and others evaded incarceration. Collins reportedly spent time hiding among Dublin's Jewish community, even posing as an Orthodox Jew and once cursing at the Black and Tans in his best imitation of Yiddish.

The new parliament, called Dáil Éireann (meaning "Assembly of Ireland", see First Dáil) met in the Mansion House, Dublin in January 1919. In de Valera's absence, Cathal Brugha was elected Príomh Aire ('First' or 'Prime' Minister but often translated as 'President of Dáil Éireann'). The following April, Collins engineered de Valera's escape from Lincoln Prison in England, after which Brugha was replaced by de Valera.

No state gave diplomatic recognition to the Irish Republic, despite sustained lobbying in Washington by de Valera and prominent Irish-Americans, and at the Paris Peace Conference in 1919.

=== Minister for Finance ===
De Valera appointed Collins as Minister for Finance in the Ministry of Dáil Éireann in 1919. At this time, most of the Dáil Éireann's ministries existed only on paper or as one or two individuals working in a room of a private house, as large gatherings of Irish republican politicians would be vulnerable to raid attempts by British Crown forces.

Despite that, Collins managed to produce a Finance Ministry that was able to organise a large bond issue in the form of a "National Loan" to fund the new Irish Republic. According to Batt O'Connor, the Dáil Loan raised almost £400,000, of which £25,000 was in gold. The loan, which was declared illegal by the British, was lodged in the individual bank accounts of the trustees. The gold was kept under the floor of O'Connor's house until 1922. The Russian Republic, in the midst of its own civil war, ordered Ludwig Martens the head of the Soviet Bureau in New York City to acquire a "national loan" from the Irish Republic through Harry Boland, offering some jewels as collateral. The jewels remained in a Dublin house until 1938, when they were handed over to de Valera.

== War of Independence ==
The Irish War of Independence in effect began on the day that the First Dáil convened, 21 January 1919. On that date, an ambush party of IRA Volunteers from the 3rd Tipperary Brigade including Séumas Robinson, Dan Breen, Seán Treacy and Seán Hogan, attacked a pair of Royal Irish Constabulary (RIC) men who were escorting a consignment of gelignite to a quarry in Soloheadbeg, County Tipperary. The two policemen were shot dead during the engagement, known as the Soloheadbeg ambush. This ambush is considered the first action in the Irish War of Independence. The engagement had no advance authorisation from the nascent government. The legislature's support for the armed struggle soon after became official, with the Dáil ratifying the IRA's claim to be the army of the Irish Republic. From that time Collins filled a number of roles in addition to his legislative duties.

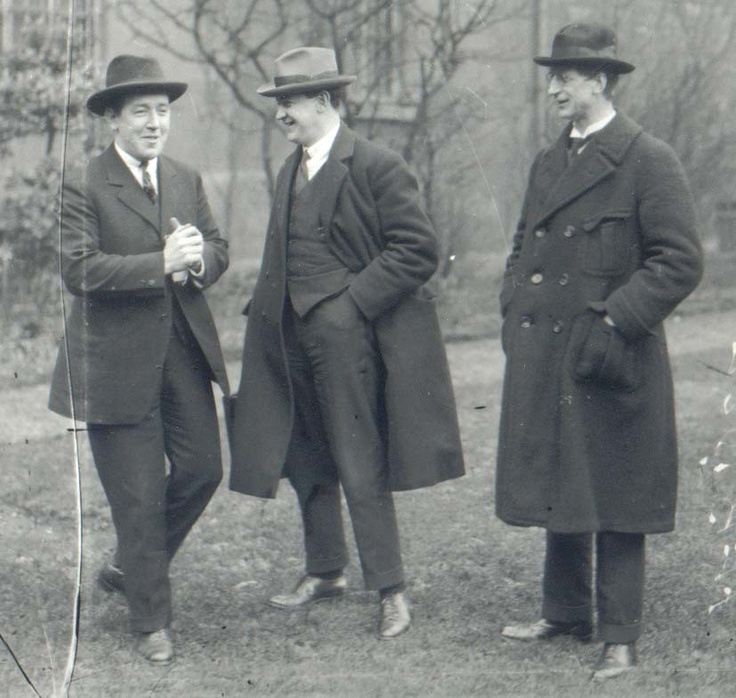
Harry Boland (l), Michael Collins (c), Éamon de Valera (r)

On 7 April 1919, Eamon Broy smuggled Collins into G Division's archives in Great Brunswick Street, enabling him to identify "G-Men", six of whom would be killed by the IRA. That summer he was elected president of the IRB (and therefore, in the doctrine of that organisation, de jure President of the Irish Republic). In mid-1919, he was made Director of Intelligence for the Irish Republican Army which now had a mandate to pursue an armed campaign, as the official military of the Irish nation. With Cathal Brugha as Minister of Defence, Collins became Director of Organisation and Adjutant General of the Volunteers. Collins spent much of this period helping to organise the Volunteers as an effective military force, and concentrating on forcing the RIC – which represented British authority in Ireland – out of isolated barracks and seizing their weapons. Collins was determined to avoid the massive destruction, military and civilian losses for merely symbolic victories that had characterised the 1916 Rising. Instead, he directed a guerrilla war against the British, suddenly attacking and then just as quickly withdrawing, minimising losses and maximising effectiveness.

The Crown responded with an escalation of the war, with the importation of special forces such as the "Auxiliaries", the "Black and Tans", the "Cairo Gang", and others. Officially or unofficially, many of these groups were given a free hand to institute a reign of terror, shooting Irish people indiscriminately, invading homes, looting and burning.

As the war began in earnest, de Valera travelled to the United States for an extended speaking tour to raise funds for the outlawed Republican government. It was in publicity for this tour that de Valera (who had been elected Príomh Aire by the Dáil) was first referred to as "President". While financially successful, grave political conflicts followed in de Valera's wake there which threatened the unity of Irish-American support for the rebels. Some members of the IRB also objected to the use of the presidential title because their organisation's constitution had a different definition of that title.

Back in Ireland, Collins arranged the "National Loan", organised the IRA, effectively led the government, and managed arms-smuggling operations. Robert Briscoe, an Irish Jew was sent by Collins to Germany in 1919 to be the chief agent for procuring arms for the IRA. While in Germany in 1921 Briscoe purchased a small tug boat named Frieda to be used in transporting guns and ammunition to Ireland. On 28 October 1921 the Frieda slipped out to sea with Charles McGuinness at the helm and a German crew with a cargo of leftover World War I weapons – 300 guns and 20,000 rounds of ammunition. Other sources cite this shipment as "the largest military shipment ever to reach the I.R.A." consisting of 1,500 rifles, 2,000 pistols and 1.7 million rounds of ammunition smuggled hidden in potatoes. Local guerrilla units received supplies, training and had largely a free hand to develop the war in their own region. These were the "flying columns" who comprised the bulk of the War of Independence rank and file in the southwest. Collins, Dick McKee and regional commanders such as Dan Breen and Tom Barry oversaw tactics and general strategy. There were also regional organisers, such as Ernie O'Malley and Liam Mellows, who reported directly to Collins at St Ita's secret basement GHQ in central Dublin. They were supported by a vast intelligence network of men and women in all walks of life that reached deep into the British administration in Ireland.

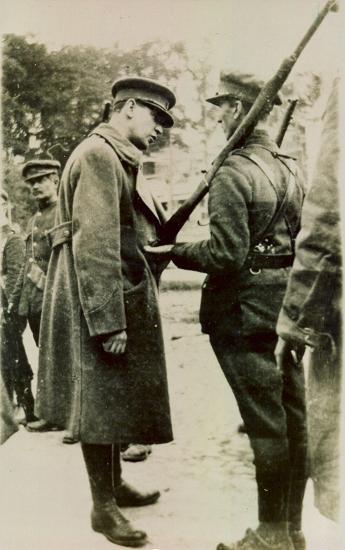
Collins inspects a soldier

It was at this time that Collins created a special assassination unit called The Squad expressly to kill British agents and informers. Collins was criticised for these tactics but cited the universal war-time practice of executing enemy spies who were, in his words, "hunting victims for execution." Campaigning for Irish independence, even non-violently, was still targeted both by prosecutions under British law entailing the death penalty and also by extrajudicial killings such as that of Tomás Mac Curtain, nationalist mayor of Cork City. In 1920, the British offered £10,000 (equivalent to around £570,000 or €645,000 in 2025) for information leading to Collins's capture or death. He evaded capture and continued to strike against British forces, often operating from safe-houses near government buildings, such as Vaughan's and An Stad.

In 1920, following Westminster's prominent announcements that it had the Irish insurgents on the run, Collins and his Squad killed several people in a series of coordinated raids, including a number of British secret service agents. Members of the Royal Irish Constabulary went to Croke Park, where a G.A.A. football match was taking place between Dublin and Tipperary. The police officers opened fire on the crowd, killing twelve and wounding sixty. This event became known as Bloody Sunday. Many British operatives sought the shelter of Dublin Castle the next day. About the same time, Tom Barry's 3rd Cork Brigade took no prisoners in a bitter battle with British forces at Kilmichael. In many regions, the RIC and other crown forces became all but confined to the strongest barracks in the larger towns as rural areas came increasingly under rebel control. These republican victories would have been impossible without widespread support from the Irish population, which included every level of society and reached deep into the British administration in Ireland. In May 1921, elections were held in the Northern part of Ireland under the 1920 Government of Ireland Act which separated the governance of six counties in Ulster from the rest of Ireland. Collins was elected to a seat in Armagh, demonstrating popular support for the republican movement.

At the time of the ceasefire in July 1921, a major operation was allegedly in planning to execute every British secret service agent in Dublin, while a major ambush involving eighty officers and men was also planned for Templeglantine, County Limerick.

=== Truce ===
In 1921 General Macready, commander of British forces in Ireland, reported to his government that the Empire's only hope of holding Ireland was by martial law, including the suspension of "all normal life". Westminster's foreign policy ruled out this option: Irish-American public opinion was important to British agendas in Asia. In addition, Britain's efforts at a military solution had already resulted in a powerful peace movement, which demanded an end to the unrest in Ireland. Prominent voices calling for negotiation included the Labour Party, The Times and other leading periodicals, members of the House of Lords, English Catholics, and famous authors such as George Bernard Shaw.

Still, it was not the British government that initiated negotiations. Individual English activists, including clergy, made private overtures which reached Arthur Griffith. Griffith expressed his welcome for dialogue. The British MP Brigadier General Cockerill sent an open letter to Prime Minister David Lloyd George that was printed in the Times, outlining how a peace conference with the Irish should be organised. Pope Benedict XV made an urgent public appeal for a negotiated end to the violence. Whether or not Lloyd George welcomed such advisors, he could no longer hold out against this tide.

In July, Lloyd George's government offered a truce. Arrangements were made for a conference between the British government and the leaders of the yet-unrecognised Republic. There remains uncertainty as to the two sides' capability to have carried on the conflict much longer. Collins told Hamar Greenwood after signing the Anglo-Irish Treaty: "You had us dead beat. We could not have lasted another three weeks. When we were told of the offer of a truce we were astonished. We thought you must have gone mad". However he stated on the record that "there will be no compromise and no negotiations with any British Government until Ireland is recognised as an independent republic. The same effort that would get us Dominion Home Rule will get us a republic." At no time had the Dáil or the IRA asked for a conference or a truce.

However, the Dáil as a whole was less uncompromising. It decided to proceed to a peace conference, although it was ascertained in the preliminary stages that a fully independent republic would not be on the table and that the loss of some northeastern counties was a foregone conclusion.

Many of the rebel forces on the ground first heard of the Truce when it was announced in the newspapers and this gave rise to the first fissures in nationalist unity, which had serious consequences later on. They felt they had not been included in consultations regarding its terms.

De Valera was widely acknowledged as the most skilful negotiator on the Dáil government side and he participated in the initial parlays, agreeing the basis on which talks could begin. The first meetings were held in strict secrecy soon after the Custom House battle, with Andrew Cope representing Dublin Castle's British authorities. Later, de Valera travelled to London for the first official contact with Lloyd George. The two met one-on-one in a private meeting, the proceedings of which have never been revealed.

During this Truce period, de Valera sued for official designation as President of the Irish Republic and obtained it from the Dáil in August 1921, in place of the title which had previously been used of President of Dáil Éireann. Not long after, the Cabinet was obliged to select the delegation that would travel to the London peace conference and negotiate a treaty. In a departure from his usual role, de Valera adamantly declined to attend, insisting instead that Collins should take his place there, along with Arthur Griffith.

Collins resisted the appointment, protesting that he was "a soldier, not a politician" and that his exposure to the London authorities would reduce his effectiveness as a guerrilla leader should hostilities resume. (He had kept his public visibility to a minimum during the conduct of the war; up to this time the British still had very few reliable photographs of him.) The Cabinet of seven split on the issue, with de Valera casting the deciding vote. Many of Collins's associates warned him not to go, that he was being set up as a political scapegoat.

== Anglo-Irish Treaty ==
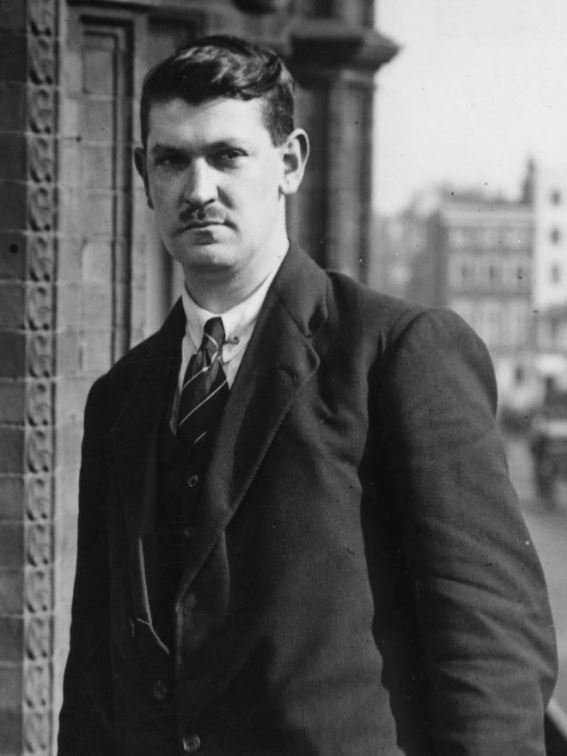
Collins in London as delegate to the Anglo-Irish Treaty negotiations

The Irish delegates sent to London were designated as "plenipotentiaries", meaning that they had full authority to sign an agreement on behalf of the Dáil government. The Treaty would then be subject to approval by the Dáil. The majority of the delegates, including Arthur Griffith (leader), Robert Barton and Eamonn Duggan (with Erskine Childers as Secretary General to the delegation) set up headquarters at 22 Hans Place in Knightsbridge on 11 October 1921. Collins shared quarters at 15 Cadogan Gardens with the delegation's publicity department, secretary Diarmuid O'Hegarty, Joseph McGrath as well as substantial intelligence and bodyguard personnel including Liam Tobin, Tom Cullen, Eamon Broy, Emmet Dalton and Joseph Dolan of The Squad.

The British team were led by their Prime Minister Lloyd George, the Colonial Secretary Winston Churchill and F. E. Smith. During two months of arduous negotiations, the Irish delegates made frequent crossings between London and Dublin to confer with their Dáil colleagues, and Collins's correspondence reflects his frustration at Dáil debates and the Irish delegate's inability to agree to clear instructions as to whether or not they should accept a treaty.

In November, with the London peace talks still in progress, Collins attended a large meeting of regional IRA commanders at Parnell Place in Dublin. In a private conference, he informed Liam Deasy, Florence O'Donoghue and Liam Lynch that there would have to be some compromise in the current negotiations in London. "There was no question of our getting all the demands we were making." He was advised by Lynch not to bring this out in the full assembly. Reviewing subsequent events, Deasy later doubted the wisdom of that advice.

The negotiations ultimately resulted in the Anglo-Irish Treaty which was signed on 6 December 1921. The agreement provided for a Dominion status "Irish Free State", whose relationship to the British Commonwealth would be modelled after Canada's. This was a compromise, halfway between an independent republic and a province of the Empire. The Treaty was signed under considerable pressure from the British. The negotiators had agreed at the cabinet meeting in Dublin that they would not sign the Treaty without bringing it back for the Dáil cabinet to ratify. But once back in London on 5 December at 7:30 pm, Lloyd George told them it was immediate signature or "immediate and terrible war" and that he had to know by the next day. Winston Churchill recalled Collins's reaction: "Michael Collins rose as if he was going to shoot someone, preferably himself. In all my life I have never seen so much passion and suffering in restraint." The Treaty was signed at 2:20 am, 6 December 1921.

The settlement overturned the Act of Union by recognising the native Irish legislature's independence. Under a bicameral parliament, the executive authority would remain vested in the king, represented in Ireland by a Governor General, but exercised by an Irish government elected by Dáil Éireann as a "lower house". British forces would depart the Free State forthwith and be replaced by an Irish army. Along with an independent judiciary, the Treaty granted the new Free State greater independence than any Irish state, and went well beyond the Home Rule which had been sought by Charles Stewart Parnell or by his Irish Parliamentary Party successors John Redmond and John Dillon.

The Treaty acknowledged the partition of Ireland. Before Treaty negotiations had concluded, executive powers had already been passed to the government of Northern Ireland created under the Government of Ireland Act in 1920. Northern Ireland, which had a majority unionist population, could opt out of the Free State, a year after the signing of the Treaty. An Irish Boundary Commission was to be established to draw a border, "in accordance with the wishes of the inhabitants' and 'economic and geographic conditions". Collins anticipated a redrawing of the border would result in much of the south and west of Northern Ireland becoming part of the Free State, making Northern Ireland economically non-viable, and facilitating the reunification of the 32 counties in the near future.

Collins argued that he had signed the Treaty as the alternative was a war that the Irish people did not want. "I say that rejection of the Treaty is a declaration of war until you have beaten the British Empire, apart from any alternative document. Rejection of the Treaty means your national policy is war ... The Treaty was signed by me, not because they held up the alternative of immediate war. I signed it because I would not be one of those to commit the Irish people to war without the Irish people committing themselves to war." While the Treaty fell short of the republic for which he had fought, Collins concluded that the Treaty offered Ireland "not the freedom that all nations desire and develop to, but the freedom to achieve it."

Nonetheless, he knew that elements of the Treaty would cause controversy in Ireland. Upon signing the treaty, F. E. Smith remarked "I may have signed my political death warrant tonight". Collins replied "I may have signed my actual death warrant".

=== Treaty debates ===
This remark encapsulated his acknowledgement that the Treaty was a compromise that would be vulnerable to charges of "sell-out" from purist Republicans. It did not establish the fully independent republic that Collins himself had shortly before demanded as a non-negotiable condition. The "physical force republicans" who made up the bulk of the army which had fought the British to a draw would be loath to accept dominion status within the British Empire or an Oath of Allegiance that mentioned the King. Also controversial was the British retention of Treaty Ports on the south coast of Ireland for the Royal Navy. These factors diminished Irish sovereignty and threatened to allow British interference in Ireland's foreign policy. Collins and Griffith were well aware of these issues and strove tenaciously, against British resistance, to achieve language which could be accepted by all constituents. They succeeded in obtaining an oath to the Irish Free State, with a subsidiary oath of fidelity to the King, rather than to the king unilaterally.

Éamon de Valera, the President of the Dáil objected to the Treaty on the grounds that it had been signed without cabinet consent and that it secured neither the full independence of Ireland nor Irish unity. Collins and his supporters argued that de Valera had refused strenuous pleas from Collins, Griffith and others to lead the London negotiations in person. He had refused the delegates' continual requests for instruction, and in fact, had been at the centre of the original decision to enter negotiations without the possibility of an independent republic on the table.

The Treaty controversy split the entire nationalist movement. Sinn Féin, the Dáil, the IRB and the army each divided into pro- and anti-Treaty factions. The Supreme Council of the IRB had been informed in detail about every facet of the Treaty negotiations and had approved many of its provisions, and all but one voted to accept the Treaty – the single exception being Liam Lynch, later Chief-of-Staff of the anti-Treaty IRA.

The Dáil debated the Treaty bitterly for ten days until it was approved by a vote of 64 to 57. Having lost this vote, de Valera announced his intent to withdraw his participation from the Dáil and called on all deputies who had voted against the Treaty to follow him. A substantial number did so, officially splitting the government.

A large part of the Irish Republican Army opposed the Treaty and in March 1922 voted at an Army Convention to reject the authority of the Dail, Collins's GHQ and to elect their own Executive. Anti-Treaty IRA units began to seize buildings and take other guerrilla actions against the Provisional Government. On 14 April 1922, a group of 200 anti-Treaty IRA men occupied the Four Courts in Dublin under Rory O'Connor, a hero of the War of Independence. The Four Courts was the centre of the Irish courts system, originally under the British and then the Free State. Collins was charged by his Free State colleagues with putting down these insurgents, however, he resisted firing on former comrades and staved off a shooting war throughout this period.

While the country teetered on the edge of civil war, continuous meetings were carried on among the various factions from January to June 1922. In these discussions, the nationalists strove to resolve the issue without armed conflict. Collins and his close associate, Teachta Dála (TD) Harry Boland were among those who worked desperately to heal the rift.

To foster military unity, Collins and the IRB established an "army re-unification committee", including delegates from pro- and anti-Treaty factions. The still-secret Irish Republican Brotherhood continued to meet, fostering dialogue between pro- and anti-Treaty IRA officers. In the IRB's stormy debates on the subject, Collins held out the Constitution of the new Free State as a possible solution. Collins was then in the process of co-writing that document and was striving to make it a republican constitution that included provisions that would allow anti-Treaty TDs to take their seats in good conscience, without any oath concerning the Crown.

== Northern Ireland ==
A map of Ireland showing the border between Northern Ireland and the Irish Free State

Since June 1920, communal conflict had been raging in north-east Ulster between the Protestant unionist majority there, who wanted to remain part of the UK, and the Catholic Irish nationalist minority, who backed Irish independence. Belfast saw "savage and unprecedented" sectarian violence. Protestant loyalists attacked the Catholic community in retaliation for IRA actions. More than 500 people were killed, more than 8,000 workers were driven out of their jobs, and more than 10,000 became refugees – mostly from the Catholic minority (see The Troubles in Ulster (1920–1922)). After the death of Collins, his concern for the plight of northern Catholics was made clear by the Belfast IRA commander Seamus Woods "Of all the Dublin government ministers, Collins had been most deeply concerned about the fate of northern Catholics." In May 1921, Ireland was partitioned under British law, creating Northern Ireland, and unionists formed a Northern government. In early 1922, there were clashes along the new border between the IRA on the Southern side and Ulster Special Constabulary (USC) on the Northern side, as well as a resurgence of sectarian violence in Belfast.

Collins strongly opposed partition, but he was ambiguous about his policy for undoing it. On one hand, he told the Dáil during the Treaty debates: "We have stated we would not coerce the North-East ... Surely we recognise that the North-East corner does exist ... The Treaty has made an effort to deal with it ... on lines that will lead very rapidly to goodwill, and the entry of the North-East under the Irish Parliament". The pro-Treaty side argued that the proposed Irish Boundary Commission would give large swathes of Northern Ireland to the Free State, leaving the remaining territory too small to be economically viable.

However, in private Collins told the northern divisions of the IRA, early in 1922 that, "although the Treaty might have seemed an outward expression of partition, the [Irish] Government plans to make it impossible ... Partition would never be recognised, even if it meant smashing the Treaty". In January 1922, six months after the ceasefire (truce), Collins helped to form an 'Ulster Council' within the IRA, which included the commanders of its five northern divisions, to co-ordinate IRA activity in the North. Collins's Provisional Government also funded Northern county councils and paid the salaries of teachers in Northern Ireland who recognised the Free State.

In March, Collins met Sir James Craig, Prime Minister of Northern Ireland, in London. They signed an agreement declaring peace in the North, which promised cooperation between Catholics and Protestants in policing and security, and a generous budget for restoring Catholics to homes which had been destroyed. To some northern Republicans Collins had formally recognized partition and had done so without consulting them. The day after the agreement was published, violence erupted again in the Arnon Street killings. A policeman was shot dead in Belfast and in reprisal, police broke into Catholic homes nearby and shot residents in their beds, including children (see McMahon killings). There was no response to Collins's demands for an inquiry. He and his Cabinet warned that they would deem the agreement broken unless Craig took action. In his continual correspondence with Churchill over violence in the North, Collins protested repeatedly that such breaches of the truce threatened to invalidate the Treaty entirely. The prospect was real enough that on 3 June 1922 Churchill presented to the Committee of Imperial Defence his plans "to protect Ulster from invasion by the South".

=== Northern offensive ===
In spring 1922, Collins, along with other IRB and IRA leaders, developed secret plans for a guerrilla offensive in Northern Ireland. It was to involve both pro- and anti-Treaty IRA units. Collins hoped the offensive would undermine the Northern Ireland government and unite the pro- and anti-treaty IRA in a shared goal. Collins and National Army GHQ secretly supplied weaponry and equipment for the offensive, and some British arms that had been supplied to the Provisional Government were passed on to the IRA. Because of this, most northern IRA units supported Collins and 524 individual volunteers came south to join the National Army in the Irish Civil War.

The offensive was to begin on 2 May 1922, but most of the IRA divisions had to postpone until later in the month. The 1st, 4th and 5th divisions, based in Southern territory, did not take part. This, and the staggered start to the offensive, made it easier for the Northern authorities to tackle. The Northern government launched a massive security crackdown and introduced internment, which would cripple the IRA in Northern Ireland. The offensive saw the Battle of Pettigo and Belleek in early June, which ended with British troops shelling IRA positions on the border. Collins chided pro-Treaty IRA units who became embroiled in the fighting and the Provisional Government issued an order that their policy was "peaceful obstruction ... and no troops from the twenty- six counties either official or attached to the executive [anti-Treaty] should be permitted to invade the six county area".

However, in early August 1922, Collins wrote to Cosgrave: "I am forced to the conclusion that we may yet have to fight the British in the north-east". At the same time, he told northern IRA officers he would "use the political arm against Craig so long as it is of use. If that fails, the treaty can go to hell and we will all start again". Collins was deeply concerned by anti-Catholic attacks in newly formed Northern Ireland. Lloyd George stated that Collins "would talk of nothing else" and was behaved like "a wild animal a mustang" when discussing the anti-Catholic attacks that were currently taking place in Ulster.

After the death of Collins, aid from the Provisional Government to the northern IRA was cut off. Belfast Brigade (IRA) leader Roger McCorley stated: "When Collins was killed the northern element [of the IRA] gave up all hope".

== Provisional government ==
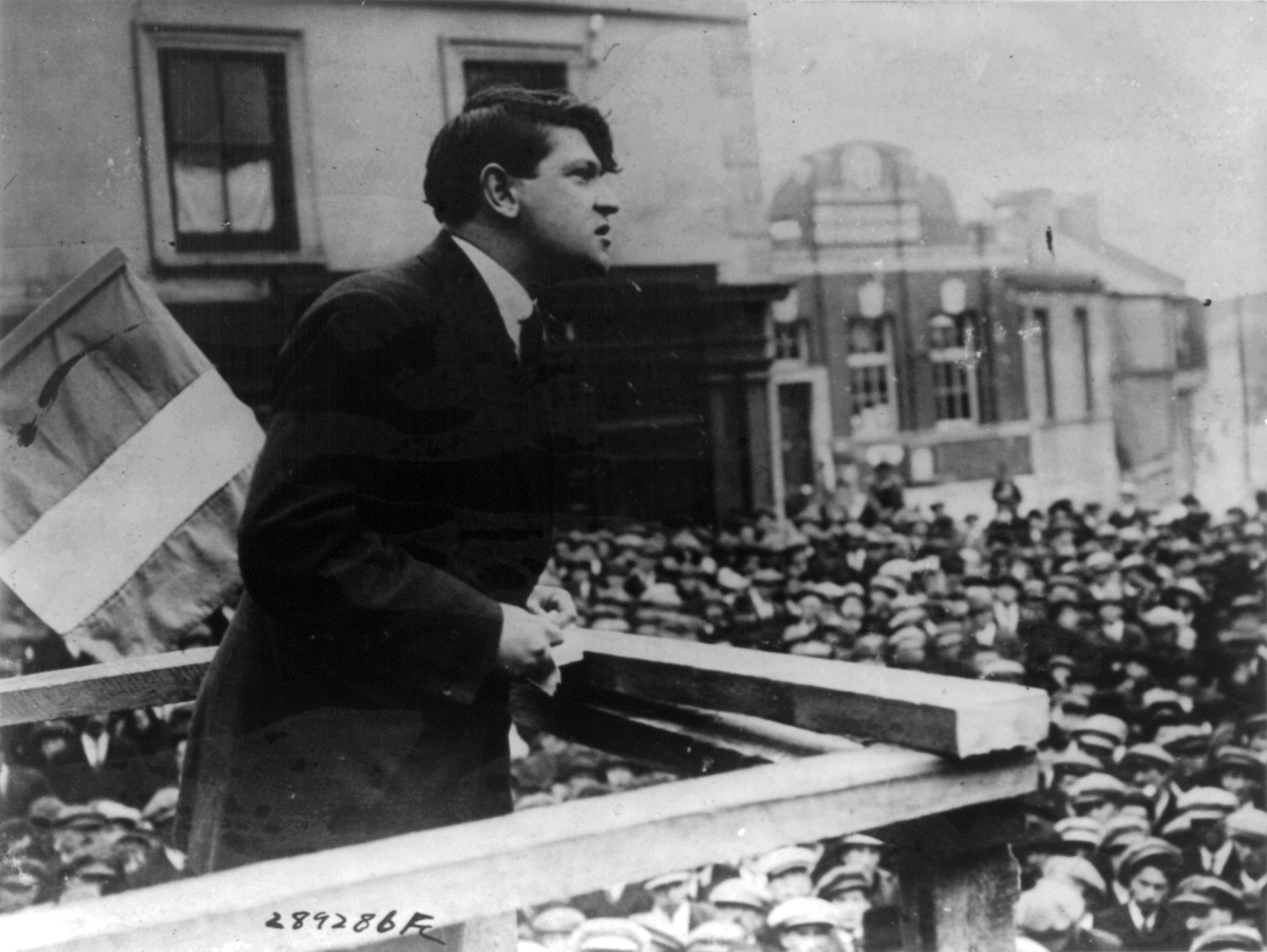
Michael Collins addresses a crowd in Skibbereen on Saint Patrick's Day, 1922.

De Valera resigned the presidency and sought re-election but Arthur Griffith replaced him after a close vote on 9 January 1922. Griffith chose as his title President of Dáil Éireann, rather than President of the Republic as de Valera had favoured. The Dáil Éireann government did not hold legal status in British constitutional law. The provisions of the Treaty required the formation of a new government established under British law with royal assent, which would be recognised by Westminster as pertaining to the Free State dominion that had been agreed under the Treaty. Despite the abdication of a large part of the Dáil, the Provisional Government (Rialtas Sealadach na hÉireann) was formed with Michael Collins as Chairman of the Cabinet (effectively Prime Minister). The Provisional Government operated concurrently with the Dáil Éireann government under Griffith. Collins retained his position as Minister for Finance in both governments.

In British legal tradition, Collins was now a Crown-appointed prime minister of a Commonwealth dominion, installed under the Royal Prerogative. To be so installed he had to formally meet the Lord Lieutenant of Ireland Viscount FitzAlan, the head of the British administration in Ireland. The republican view of the same meeting is that Collins met FitzAlan to accept the surrender of Dublin Castle, the official seat of the British government in Ireland. Having surrendered, FitzAlan still remained in place as viceroy until December 1922.

The Provisional Government's first obligation was to create a Constitution for the Free State. This was undertaken by Collins and a team of solicitors. The outcome of their work became the Irish Constitution of 1922. He drew up a republican constitution which, without repudiating the Treaty, would include no mention of the British King. His object was that the Constitution would allow participation in the Dáil by dissenting TDs who opposed the Treaty and refused to take any oath recognising the Crown. Under the Treaty, the Free State was obliged to submit its new Constitution to Westminster for approval. Upon doing so, in June 1922, Collins and Griffith found Lloyd George determined to veto the provisions they had fashioned to prevent civil war.

The meetings with Lloyd George and Churchill were bitter and contentious. Collins, although less diplomatic than Griffith or de Valera, had no less penetrating comprehension of political issues. He complained that he was being manipulated into "doing Churchill's dirty work", in a potential civil war with his own former troops.

== Pact elections ==
Negotiations to prevent civil war resulted in, among others, "The Army Document" published in May 1922 which was signed by an equal number of pro- and anti-Treaty IRA officers including Collins, Dan Breen, and Gearóid O'Sullivan. This manifesto declared that "a closing of ranks all round is necessary" to prevent "the greatest catastrophe in Irish history". It called for new elections, to be followed by the re-unification of the government and army, whatever the result.

In this spirit and with the organising efforts of moderates on both sides, the Collins–de Valera "Pact" was created. This pact agreed that new elections to the Dáil would be held with each candidate running as explicitly pro- or anti-Treaty and that, regardless of which side obtained a majority, the two factions would then join to form a coalition government of national unity.

A referendum on the Treaty was also planned but it never took place. The Pact elections on 16 June 1922 therefore comprise the best quantitative record of the Irish public's response to the Treaty. The results were pro-Treaty 58 seats, anti-Treaty 36, Labour Party 17, Independents 6, Farmers Party 7, plus 4 Unionists from Trinity College Dublin.

== Assassination of Sir Henry Wilson ==
Six days after the Pact elections, Sir Henry Wilson was assassinated by Reginald Dunne and Joseph O'Sullivan—two London-based IRA volunteers, who had served in World War I—outside Wilson's home at 36 Eaton Place at approximately 2:20 pm. He was in full uniform as he was returning from unveiling the Great Eastern Railway War Memorial at Liverpool Street station at 1pm. Shot while he crossed the pavement from a taxi to his house, Wilson suffered six wounds to the chest. Two police officers and a chauffeur were also shot as the assassins sought to avoid capture. They were surrounded by a crowd and arrested by other policemen. Dunne and O'Sullivan were convicted of murder and hanged on 10 August 1922.

A British Army field marshal, Wilson had resigned his commission and been elected an MP for a constituency in Northern Ireland. He had a long history as one of the chief British leaders opposing Collins in the conflict. Wilson had served as military advisor to the Northern Ireland government led by James Craig, in which role he was seen to be responsible for the B-Specials and other loyalist violence in the north. The debate concerning Collins's involvement continued in the 1950s when statements and rebuttals on the subject were published in periodicals. These were reprinted with additions in Rex Taylor's 1961 book, Assassination: the death of Sir Henry Wilson and the tragedy of Ireland. Participants in that discussion were Joe Dolan, Florence O'Donoghue, Denis P. Kelleher, Patrick O'Sullivan, and others.

== Civil War ==
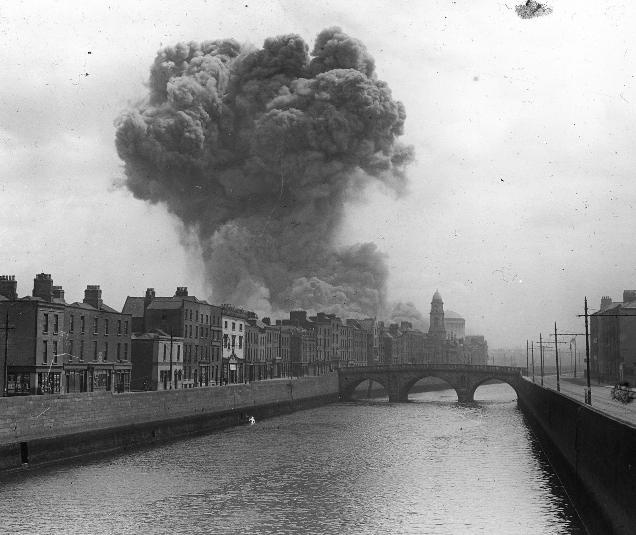
The Provisional Government, led by Collins, gave the order to bombard the Four Courts with artillery shells in an attempt to remove the anti-Treaty IRA. This was the start of the Irish Civil War.

The death of Sir Henry Wilson caused a furor in London. Lloyd George, the Prime Minister, sent a letter to Collins saying that the 'ambiguous position' of the Provisional Government with regard to the IRA in the Four Courts could no longer be tolerated. The British cabinet met the day after the assassination and agreed that Collins's reply had not given a 'definite enough commitment' to disperse the Four Courts occupation. They ordered Nevil Macready, commander of the British garrison still in Dublin, to attack the Four Courts, whose republican garrison they blamed for the shooting of Wilson. The plan was put on hold at the last minute when Macready advised the government, on 26 June, to give Collins's Provisional Government one more chance to act against the Four Courts.

Collins himself was in Cork at the time of the crisis. President Arthur Griffith and military officer Emmet Dalton met with British officials to discuss 'the continued occupation of the Four Courts by the Irregulars under Rory O'Connor'. There is little documentation of the decision taken by the Provisional Government, headed by Collins, to attack the Four Courts; Historian Michael Hopkinson writes, 'the scarcity of evidence is explained by the acute sensitivity of the subject, both at the time and since'. When Collins arrived back in Dublin, his forces began to act against the anti-Treatyites. On 27 June they arrested anti-Treaty IRA officer Leo Henderson as he was enforcing the Belfast Boycott by seizing cars. In retaliation the anti-Treaty IRA men abducted J. J. "Ginger" O'Connell, a Free State general, and held him in the Four Courts.

These two developments led to the Provisional Government's 27 June 1922 order serving notice on the Four Courts garrison to surrender the building, their arms and release O'Connell, that night or face military action "at once". According to historian Charles Townsend, 'Collins must have consented to this though the actual decision seems to have been taken by Griffith'. Peter Hart similarly writes, 'it was Griffith rather than Collins who took the lead in this decision'. However a contemporary observer of events, cabinet member Ernest Blythe, contradicts the historians recalling that, 'the decision to attack the Four Courts was almost automatic once Collins had agreed to it'.

Collins's position in this conflict was extraordinary indeed. A majority of the IRA he had helped lead in the War of Independence, were now ranged against the Provisional Government, which he led. In addition, the force which by the will of the electorate he was obliged to lead had been re-organised since the Truce. Formed from a nucleus of pro-Treaty IRA men, it had evolved into a more formal, structured, uniformed National Army that was armed and funded by Britain. Many of the new members were World War I veterans and others who had not fought on the nationalist side before. Collins's profoundly mixed feelings about this situation are recorded in his private and official correspondence.

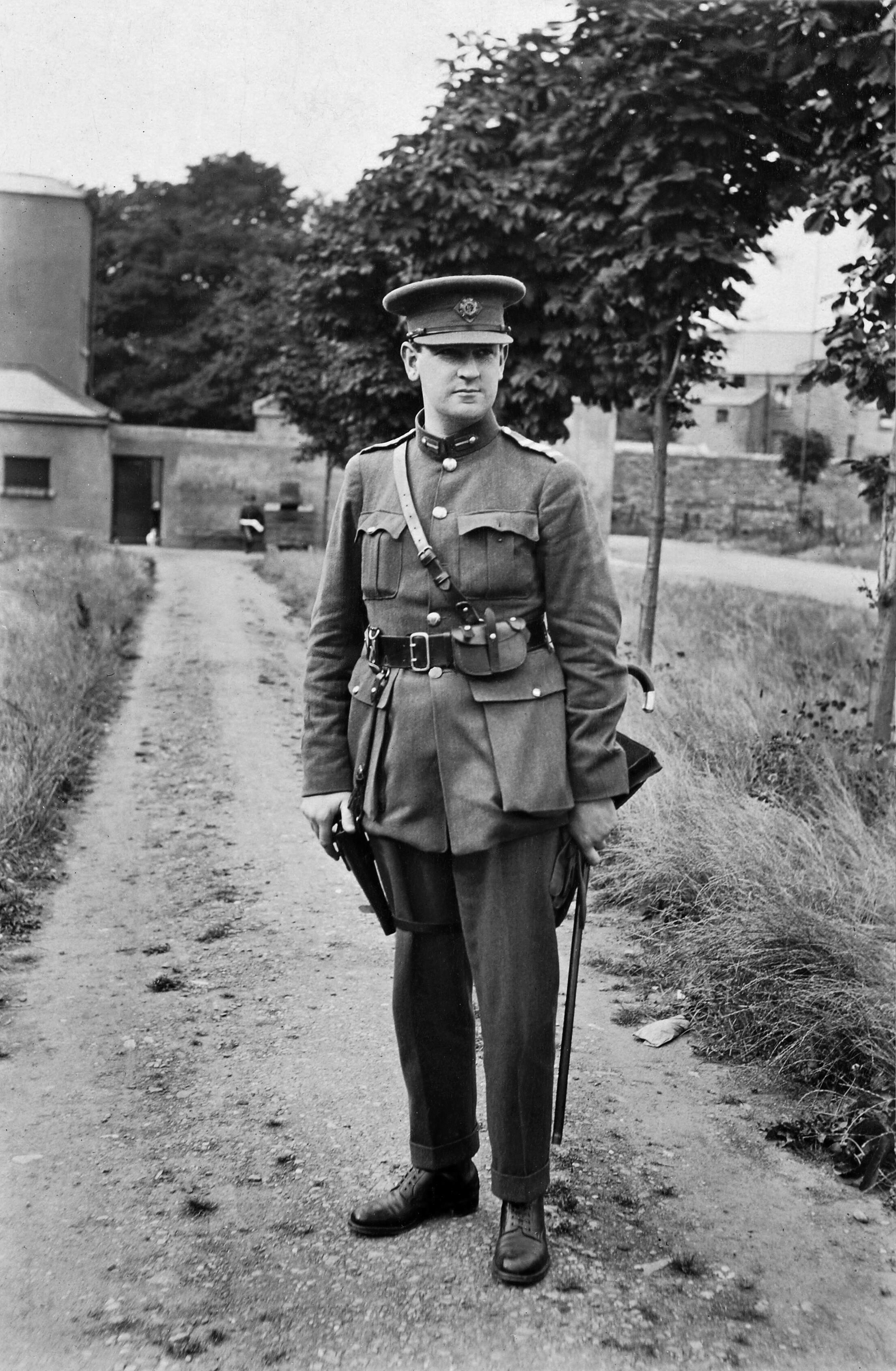
Michael Collins as Commander-in-Chief of the Irish National Forces

Artillery was provided to Richard Mulcahy, as Minister for Defence and the Free State Army by the British for the purposes of attacking the Four Courts. Emmet Dalton, an Irishman who had served in the British Army and the IRA, who was now a leading Free State commander and close associate of Collins, was placed in charge of it. The Four Courts surrendered after three days of fighting.

Heavy fighting broke out in Dublin between the anti-Treaty IRA Dublin Brigade and the Free State troops. Much of O'Connell Street suffered heavy damage; the Gresham Hotel was burned and the Four Courts reduced to a ruin. Still, under Collins's direction, the Free State rapidly took control of the capital. By July 1922 anti-Treaty forces held much of the southern province of Munster and several other areas of the country. At the height of their success, they administered local government and policing in large regions. Collins, Richard Mulcahy, and Eoin O'Duffy decided on a series of seaborne landings into republican-held areas, which re-took Munster and the west in July–August.

That July, Collins became Commander-in-Chief of the National Army while also retaining his civilian roles as Minister of Finance and Chairman of the Provisional Government. However, according to Charles Townshend, he became 'a kind of generalissimo, combining military and political supremacy. Griffith had no desire or capacity to dispute the day-to-day conduct of government with him and while Mulcahy had great administrative capacity, he deferred to Collins as a strategist and thinker'. He also prorogued the meeting of the Dail until the end of hostilities, a move that historians such as John M. Regan have seen as an unconstitutional concentration of power in Collins himself and his military colleagues. On 12 July, the pro-treaty army formed a 'War Council of Three' led by Collins with Richard Mulcahy and Eoin O'Duffy. At the same time martial law was introduced but not proclaimed until January 1923. At this time, Collins was President of the IRB Supreme Council which claimed to be the legitimate government of the Irish Republic, commander-in-chief of the pro-treaty army, while retaining control of the Provisional Government which remained unaccountable to any government in September. On the pro-treaty side, Collins controlled civil, military, and the extra constitutional powers of the IRB. The IRB Executive, which acted as the IRB government when the supreme council was not sitting, closely resembled the 'War Council of Three' with Collins and O'Duffy sitting on both. The third member of the IRB Executive was Sean O'Muithile, who Collins appointed as the commissioner of the new police force shortly before Collins was killed in action. The appointment was later rescinded.

=== Civil War peace moves ===
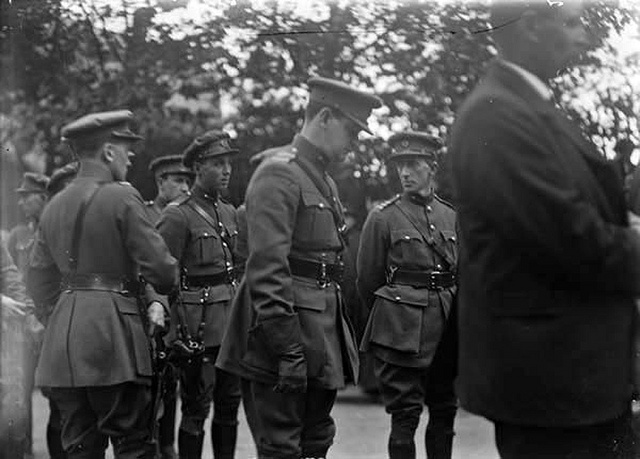
Collins and Richard Mulcahy at Arthur Griffith's funeral, a few days before Collins's death

Roughly two weeks after Cork city had been taken by Provisional Government forces, Collins travelled there to attempt to seize large sums of money that the anti-Treaty Republicans had lodged in banks, under the account of the Land Bank. There is considerable evidence that Collins's journey to Cork in August 1922 was made in order to meet republican leaders with a view to ending the war.

Collins conducted a series of meetings, regarding the possibility of peace talks in Cork on 21–22 August. In Cork city, Collins met with neutral IRA members Seán O'Hegarty and Florence O'Donoghue with a view to contacting Anti-Treaty IRA leaders Tom Barry and Tom Hales to propose a truce. The anti-Treaty side had called a major convocation of officers to Béal na Bláth, a remote crossroads, with ending the war on the agenda. De Valera was present there. However, Michael Hopkinson writes that 'there is no evidence that there was any prospect of a meeting between de Valera and Collins. The People's Rights Association, a local initiative in Cork City, had been mediating a discussion of terms between the Provisional Government and anti-Treaty side for weeks.

Collins's diary outlined his proposals for peace. Republicans must "accept the People's Verdict" on the Treaty, but could then "go home without their arms. We don't ask for any surrender of their principles". He argued that the Provisional Government was upholding "the people's rights" and would continue to do so. "We want to avoid any possible unnecessary destruction and loss of life. We do not want to mitigate their weakness by resolute action beyond what is required". But if Republicans did not accept his terms, "further blood is on their shoulders".

== Death ==
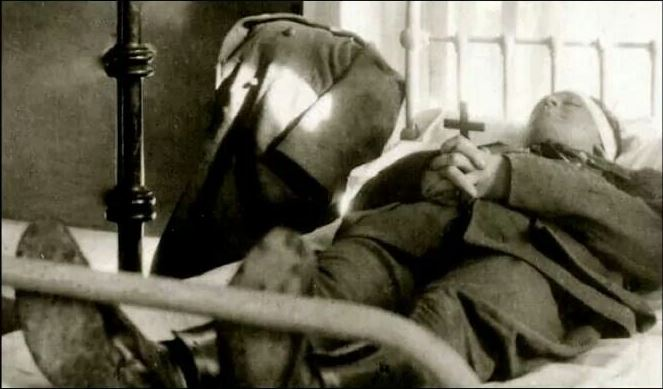
Collins's body laid out at Shanakiel Hospital in Cork

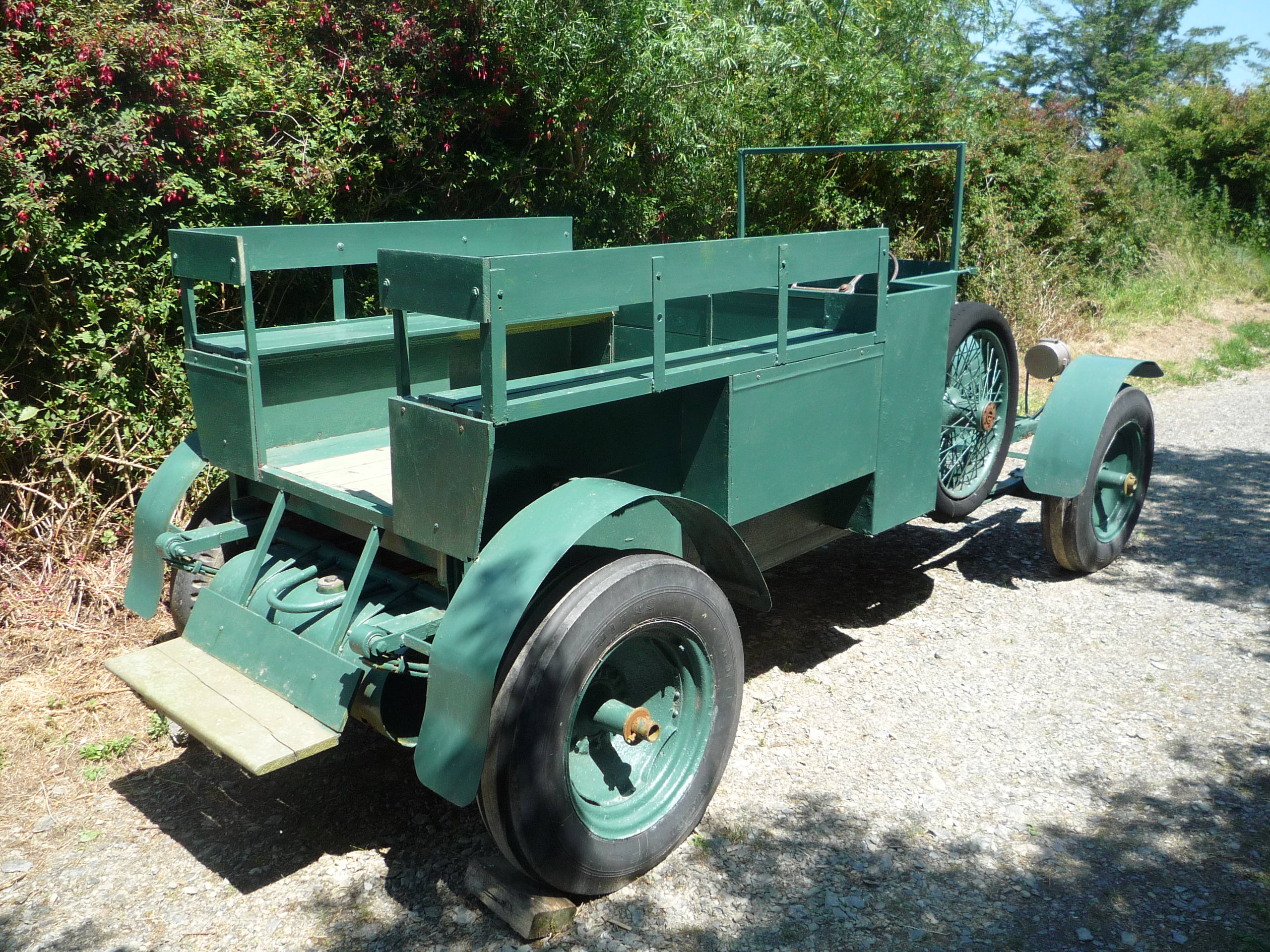
A replica of the Crossley Tender in Collins's convoy on a replica of the road where it happened

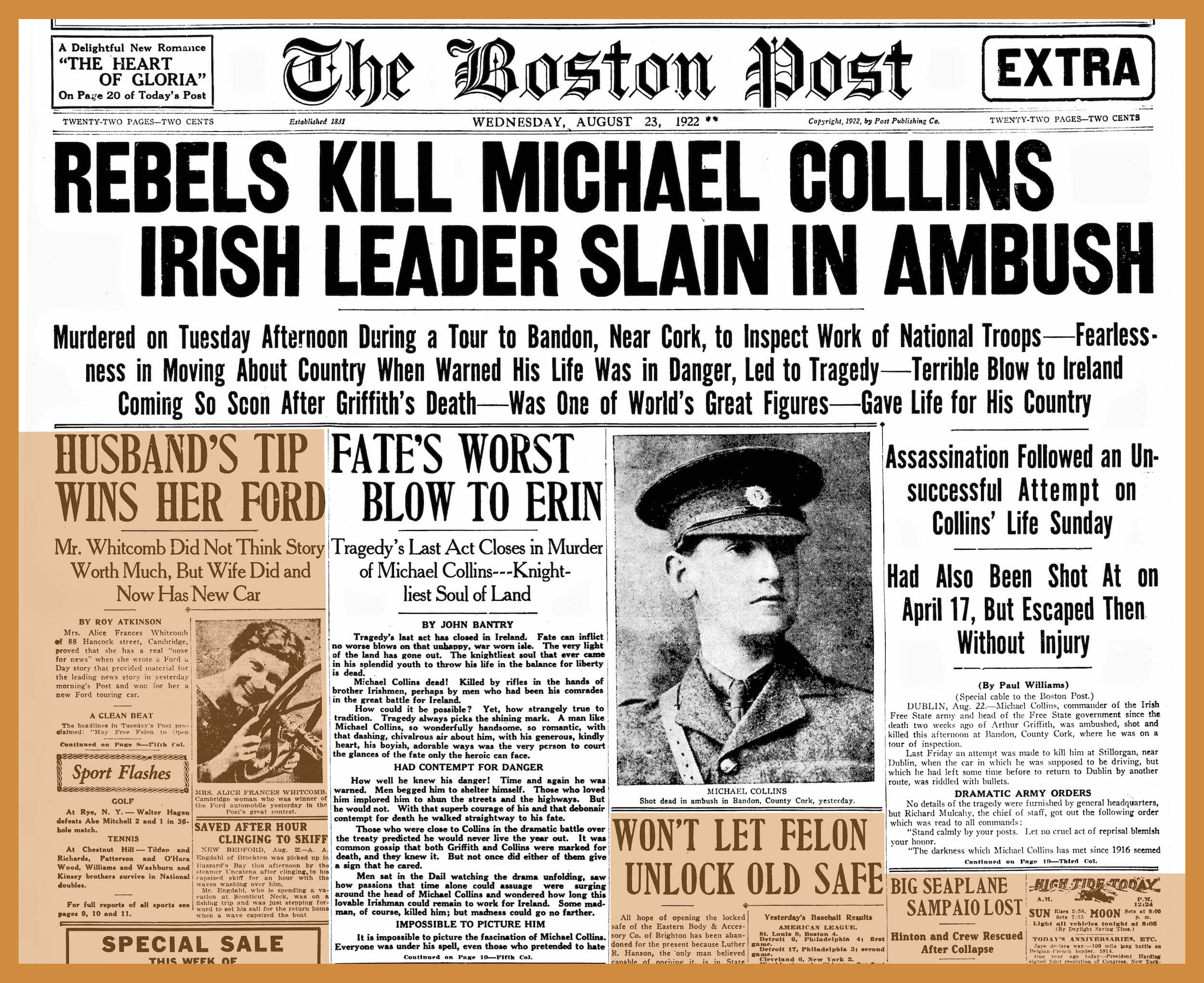
A newspaper in Boston—a U.S. city with a large population of Irish immigrants—described Collins with adulation, describing his "contempt for danger" through several prior attempts on his life, including a separate attempt only a few days prior.

In August 1922, it seemed as though the Civil War was winding down. The Free State had regained control of most of the country, and Collins was making frequent trips to inspect areas recently recovered from anti-Treaty forces.

His plan to travel to his native Cork on 20 August was considered particularly dangerous, and he was strenuously advised against it by several trusted associates. County Cork was an IRA stronghold as much of it was still held by anti-Treaty forces. Yet he was determined to make the trip without delay. He had fended off a number of attempts on his life in the preceding weeks; he had also acknowledged more than once, in private conversation, that the Civil War might end his life at any moment.

On 22 August 1922, Collins set out from Cork City on a circuitous tour of West Cork. He passed first through Macroom and then took the Bandon road via Crookstown. This led through Béal na Bláth, an isolated crossroads. There they stopped at a local pub named 'Long's Pub', now known as The Diamond Bar, to ask a question of a man standing at the crossroad. The man turned out to be an anti-Treaty sentry. He and an associate recognised Collins in the back of the open-top car.

As a result, an ambush was laid by an anti-Treaty column at that point, on the chance that the convoy might come through again on their return journey. Concern was expressed to Collins by a local army officer in Bandon that his convoy was too small to be travelling through territory much frequented by the IRA; while not acting on this advice, after leaving that town Collins said to Dalton: "I don't suppose I will be ambushed in my own county". As dusk was drawing in between 7:30 and 8:00 pm, (Note: In 1922, daylight saving time was not generally used by people in Ireland and local time was one hour behind official time. This explains why most accounts of the ambush by those in the vicinity record an early twilight time for summer in a northern latitude ("The Ambush". Collins 22 Society, 2014. Retrieved 5 October 2026)) Collins's convoy approached Béal na Bláth for the second time. By then most of the ambush party had dispersed and gone for the day, leaving just five or six men on the scene. Two were disarming a mine in the road, while three on a laneway overlooking them, provided cover. A dray cart, placed across the road, remained at the far end of the ambush site.

The 'Irregulars' in the laneway opened fire with rifles on the convoy. Emmet Dalton, the Free State commander for the county, ordered the driver of the touring car to 'drive like hell', but Collins said 'no, stop and we'll fight 'em'. He then jumped from the vehicle along with the others. At first, the group took cover behind a low grass bank bordering the road, but Collins then jumped up and ran back along the road to begin firing with his Lee Enfield rifle from behind the armoured car Slievenamon. The Vickers machine gun in that car had also been firing at the attackers but then stopped because a badly loaded ammunition belt caused it to jam.

Apparently, to get a better view of the laneway up which he had seen the enemy running, Collins left the protection of the armoured car and moved even farther back around a bend in the road out of sight of his comrades. Now standing in the open, he fired a couple of shots and as he was once more working the bolt of his rifle he was struck in the head by a bullet believed to have been fired by one of the ambushing party – Denis "Sonny" O'Neill, a former British Army sniper.

Collins was the only man killed in the ambush, although another member of his party suffered a neck wound. After he was shot, the fire from the ambushing party quickly fell off and they withdrew from the scene. Collins was found, face down, on the roadway. One of his men whispered an Act of Contrition into his ear, but Collins was clearly close to death if not already dead. He was lifted into the back of the touring car with his head resting against Dalton's shoulder. The convoy cleared the dray cart obstruction and resumed its journey to Cork.

The lengthy time the convoy took to cover the twenty miles (32 km) back to Cork City was because many of the roads were blocked and the convoy had to travel across muddy fields and through farms to circumnavigate the obstacles, all in darkness. At times, when the vehicles became bogged down, members of the convoy had to carry Collins's body on their shoulders. The touring car eventually had to be abandoned because of mechanical trouble.

There was no autopsy. Collins's field diary was taken by Dalton who had been with him during his tour of the south. The body was first presented at Shanakiel Hospital in Cork, a small military establishment, and then shipped around the coast to Dublin where it was laid out in St Vincent's Hospital. From there it was removed to the City Hall beside Dublin Castle where it was laid in state.

Sonny O'Neill was a former officer from the Royal Irish Constabulary who served as a sniper in the British Army during the First World War. O'Neill had joined the IRA in 1918 and provided information concerning the Cairo Gang that worked for the British Army Intelligence Centre; he had met Collins on more than one occasion. When the Irish Civil War started in June 1922, O'Neill joined the Anti-Treaty IRA, where he was in charge of training in the Southern Division in Mallow. The Irish State granted O'Neill a captain's military pension in 1939.

== Aftermath ==
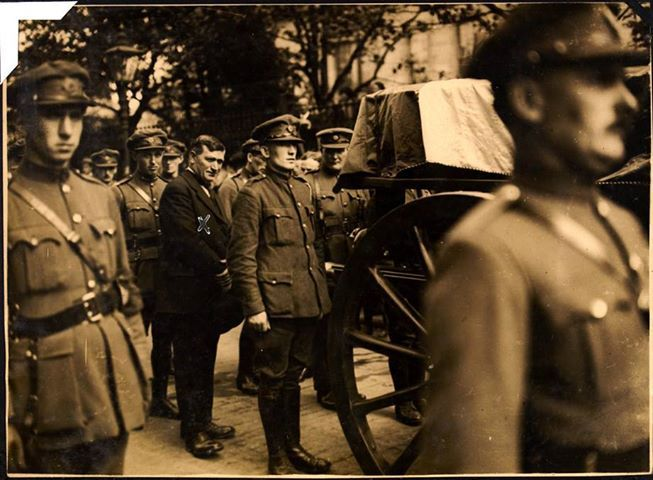
Sean Collins behind the coffin of his brother Michael

Collins lay in state for three days. Tens of thousands of mourners filed past his coffin to pay their respects, including many British soldiers departing Ireland who had fought against him. His funeral mass took place at Dublin's St Mary's Pro-Cathedral where a number of foreign and Irish dignitaries were in attendance. Some 500,000 people attended his funeral, almost one-fifth of the country's population at that time.

No official inquiry was ever undertaken into Collins's death and consequently, there is no official version of what happened, nor are there any authoritative, detailed contemporary records.

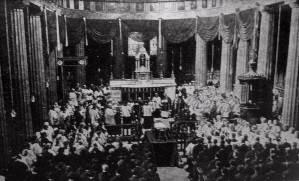
Funeral of Michael Collins in the Pro-Cathedral, Dublin (contemporary newspaper depiction of the state funeral)

De Valera is alleged to have declared in 1966, "It is my considered opinion that in the fullness of time history will record the greatness of Michael Collins; and it will be recorded at my expense." However, there is no evidence he ever made this remark.

== Personal life ==
Collins's elderly father, who was 75 when his youngest child was born, inspired his fondness and respect for older people. His mother, who had spent her youth caring for her own invalid mother and raising her own brothers and sisters, was a powerful influence. The entire management of the Collins farm fell to her, as her husband succumbed to old age and died. In a society which honoured hospitality as a prime virtue, Mrs Collins was eulogised as "a hostess in ten thousand". Her five daughters avowedly doted on their youngest brother. He enjoyed rough-housing and outdoor sports. Having won a local wrestling championship while he was still a boy, he is said to have made a pastime of challenging larger, older opponents, with frequent success. A very fit, active man throughout life, in the most stressful times he continued to enjoy wrestling as a form of relaxation and valued friendships which afforded opportunities to share athletic pursuits. He could be abrasive, demanding, and inconsiderate of those around him, but frequently made up for it with gestures such as confectionery and other small gifts.

Unlike some of his political opponents, he had many close personal friendships within the movement. It has been justly said that while some were devoted to "the idea of Ireland", Collins was a people person whose patriotism was rooted in affection and respect for the people of Ireland around him. Among his famous last words is the final entry in his pocket diary, written on the journey that ended his life, "The people are splendid."

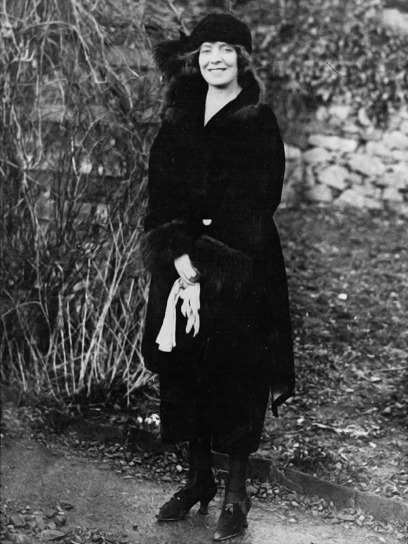
Kitty Kiernan

In 1921–22, he became engaged to Kitty Kiernan. Under Kiernan's influence, he would resume Catholic religious practice (though retaining secularism as a political position), despite his previous hostility to the Irish Catholic hierarchy. He made a general confession before his departure for London to negotiate the Anglo-Irish Treaty. While in London, his practice of lighting votive candles for Kiernan developed a habit of attending mass daily, usually at the Brompton Oratory. In letters between the two, he credits Kiernan as having given him a newfound appreciation of Confession and Communion. Collins attended Mass regularly throughout the ensuing civil war.

Collins was a complex man whose character abounded in contradictions. He seems never to have pursued personal profit. This characteristic was exemplified by a letter he wrote on 4 August 1922 to his canvassing agent; offering to pay half the bill for a hired election car because some of the journeys had been for personal trips. While clearly fond of command and keen to take charge, he had an equal appetite for input and advice from people at every level of the organisation, prompting the comment that "he took advice from his chauffeur." Although acknowledged by friends and foes as "head centre" of the movement, he continually chose a title just short of actual head of state; becoming Chairman of the Provisional Government only after the abdication of half the Dáil forced him to do so. While his official and personal correspondence records his solicitous care for the wants of insurgents in need, during the war he showed no hesitation in ordering the death of opponents who threatened nationalist lives.

While mastermind of a clandestine military, he remained a public figure. When official head of the Free State government, he continued to cooperate in the IRA's secret operations. He was capable of bold, decisive actions on his own authority, which caused friction with his colleagues, such as his falling out with Cathal Brugha; but at critical junctures, he could also bow to majority decisions which were profoundly disadvantageous and dangerous to his own interests, such as his appointment to the Treaty negotiating team.

== Commemoration ==
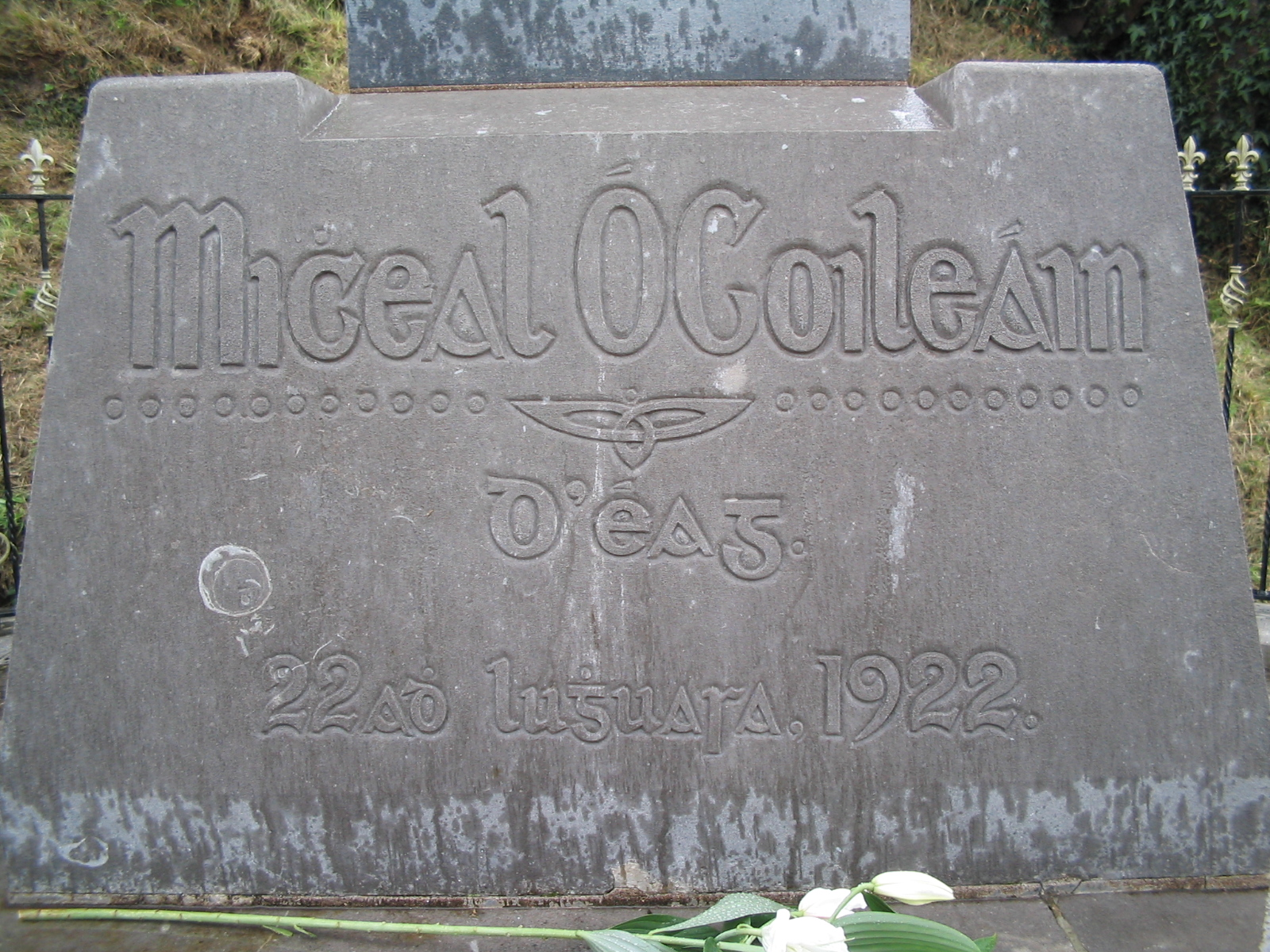
Memorial cross at Béal na Bláth

An annual commemoration ceremony takes place in August near the ambush site at Béal na Bláth, County Cork, (Note: The cross is not placed at the actual spot where Collins was shot. This is located a number of yards to the south and on the other side of the road (see Damian Shiels and Nial Murray, 'The Archaeology of an Ambush: Surviving Traces of Béal na Blá, 22 August 1922'. RTÉ, 19 August 2022. Retrieved 10 January 2025. Also, Edward O'Mahony, 'The Ambush at Béal na mBláth'. Collins 22 Society, 2014. Retrieved 10 January 2025)) organised by The Béal na mBláth Commemoration Committee. In 2009, the former President of Ireland Mary Robinson gave the oration. In 2010 the Minister for Finance Brian Lenihan Jnr became the first Fianna Fáil person to give the oration. In 2012 on the 90th anniversary of the death of Collins, the Taoiseach Enda Kenny gave the oration, the first serving head of government to do so. There is also a remembrance ceremony at Collins's grave in Glasnevin Cemetery on the anniversary of his death every year.

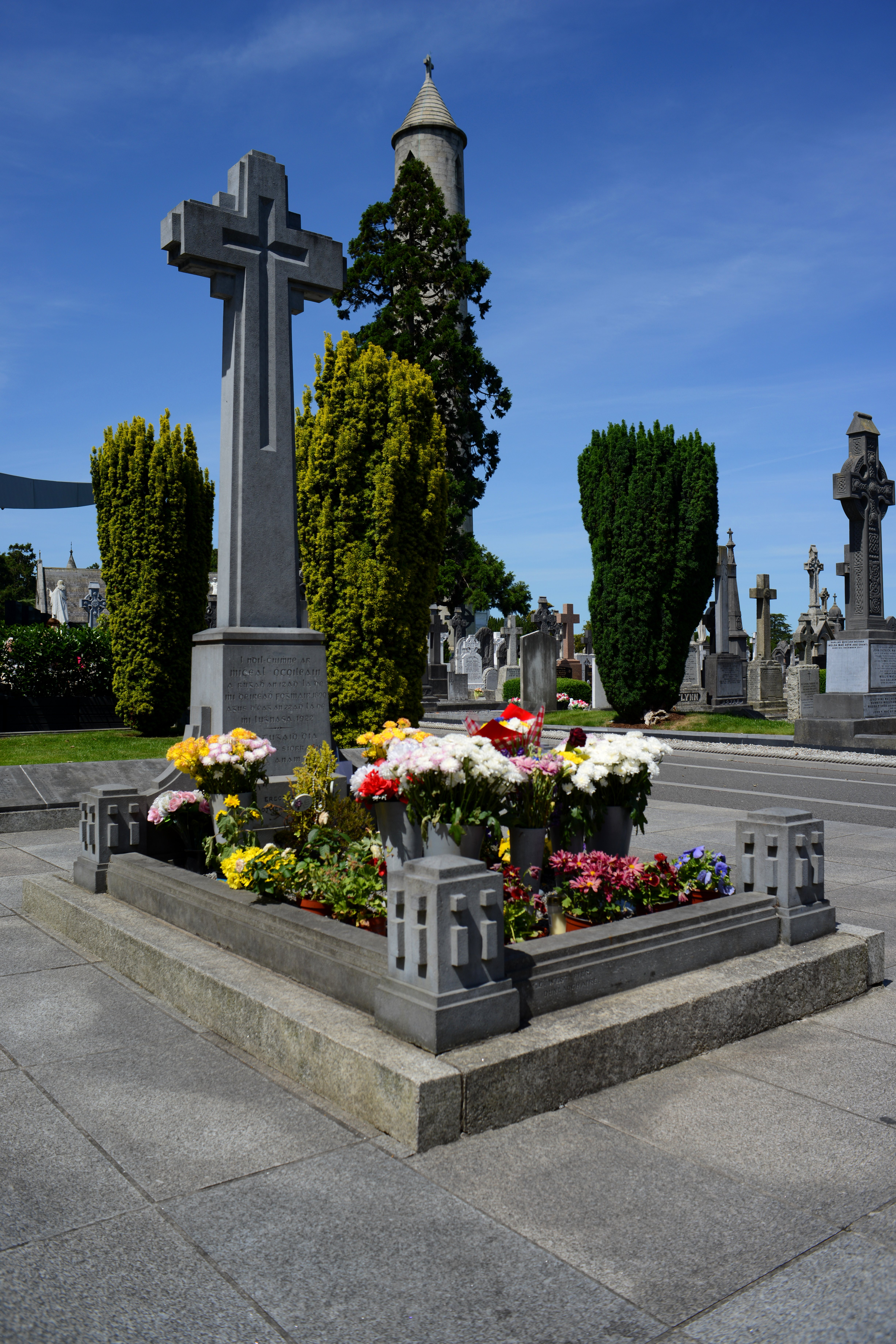
Collins's grave at Glasnevin Cemetery

Michael Collins House museum in Clonakilty, Cork is a museum dedicated to Michael Collins and the history of Irish Independence. Situated in a restored Georgian House on Emmet Square, where Collins once lived, the museum, tells the life story of Collins through guided tours, interactive displays, audiovisuals and historical artefacts.

The Central Bank of Ireland released gold and silver commemorative coins on 15 August 2012 which feature a portrait of Michael Collins designed by Thomas Ryan based on a photograph taken not long before his death.

== Legacy ==
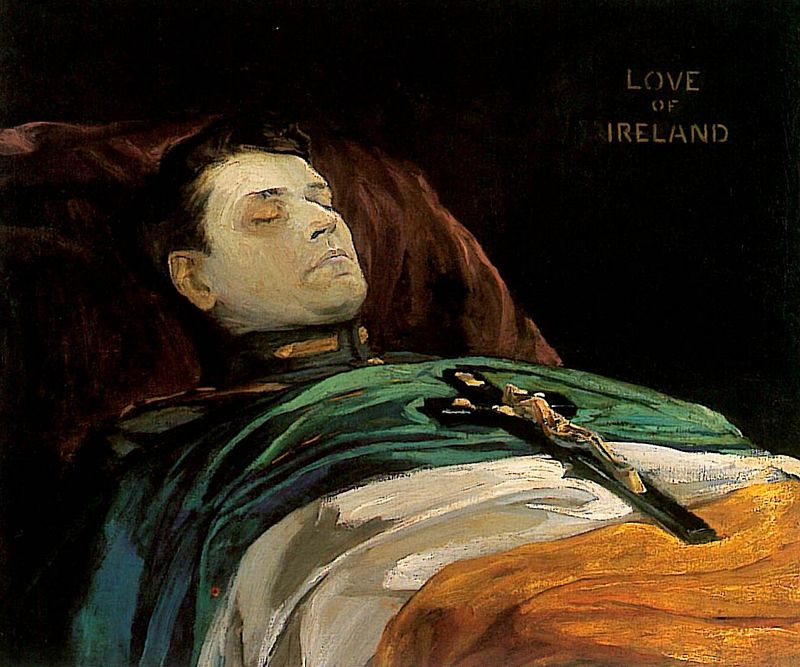
Love of Ireland by John Lavery

Collins bequeathed to posterity a considerable body of writing: essays, speeches and tracts, articles and official documents in which he outlined plans for Ireland's economic and cultural revival, as well as a voluminous correspondence, both official and personal. Selections have been published in The Path to Freedom (Mercier, 1968) and in Michael Collins in His Own Words (Gill & Macmillan, 1997). In the 1960s, Taoiseach Seán Lemass, himself a veteran of the 1916 Rising and War of Independence, credited Collins's ideas as the basis for his successes in revitalizing Ireland's economy.

Nine years after his death, the UK Parliament passed the Statute of Westminster, which removed virtually all of London's remaining authority over the Free State and the other dominions. This had the effect of granting the Free State internationally recognised independence, thus fulfilling Collins's vision of having "the freedom to achieve freedom".

Collins and the IRA were a major source of inspiration for the leader of the Zionist insurgent Lehi group and future Prime Minister of Israel Yitzhak Shamir. During the 1948 Palestine War Shamir adopted "Michael" as his nom de guerre. Chinese leader Mao Zedong also studied Collins's practices of guerrilla warfare.

The Collins 22 Society established in 2002 is an international organisation dedicated to keeping the name and legacy of Michael Collins in living memory. The patron of the society is Ireland's former Minister for Justice and TD Nora Owen, grand-niece of Michael Collins.

== Quotations ==
"That volley which we have just heard is the only speech which it is proper to make over the grave of a dead Fenian." Said by Collins at the funeral of Thomas Ashe in Glasnevin Cemetery on 30 September 1917.

"Think—what I have got for Ireland? Something which she has wanted these past 700 years. Will anyone be satisfied at the bargain? Will anyone? I tell you this—early this morning I signed my death warrant". Written in a letter dated 6 December 1921 after the signing of the treaty that established the Irish Free State.

When an elder Sinn Féin veteran asked Collins: "Where were you in 1904 when I and others were founding the Sinn Fein movement?" He responded bluntly. "I was playing with marbles, damn you!"

"We've been waiting 700 years, you can have the seven minutes". Said by Collins on 16 January 1922 when arriving at Dublin Castle for the handover by British forces after being told that he was seven minutes late.

"My own fellow countrymen won't kill me". Said by Collins on 20 August 1922 before leaving for Cork where he was ambushed and killed.

== In popular culture ==
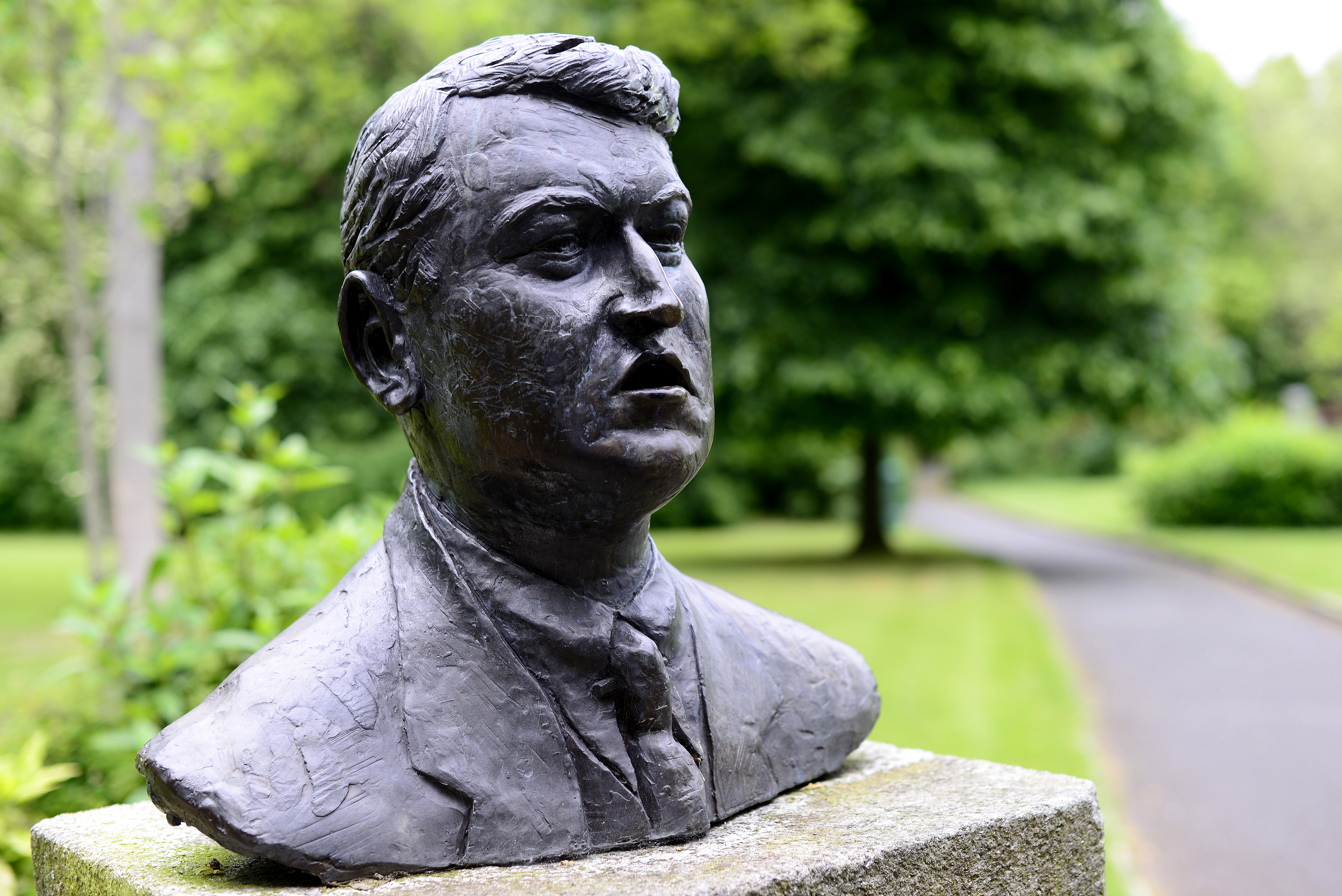
Bust of Michael Collins at Merrion Square Park, Dublin, Ireland.

=== Film and television ===
The 1936 film Beloved Enemy is a fictionalised account of Collins's life. Unlike the real Michael Collins, the fictionalised "Dennis Riordan" (played by Brian Aherne) is shot but recovers. Hang Up Your Brightest Colours, a British documentary by Kenneth Griffith, was made for ITV in 1973, but refused transmission. It was eventually screened by the BBC in Wales in 1993 and across the United Kingdom the following year.

In 1969, Dominic Behan wrote an episode of the UK television series Play for Today entitled "Michael Collins". The play dealt with Collins's attempt to take the gun out of Irish politics and took the perspective of the republican argument. At the time of writing the script, the Troubles had just begun in Northern Ireland and the BBC was reluctant to broadcast the production. An appeal by the author to David Attenborough (Director of Programming for the BBC at that time) resulted in the play eventually being broadcast; Attenborough took the view that the imperatives of free speech could not be compromised in the cause of political expediency.

A 1987 film production based on Collins's life, directed by Michael Cimino, was halted due to objections from Irish locals.

An Irish documentary made by Colm Connolly for RTÉ Television in 1989 called The Shadow of Béal na Bláth covered Collins's death. A made-for-TV film, The Treaty, was produced in 1991 and starred Brendan Gleeson as Collins and Ian Bannen as David Lloyd George. In 2007, RTÉ produced a documentary entitled Get Collins, about the intelligence war which took place in Dublin.

Collins was the subject of director Neil Jordan's 1996 film Michael Collins, with Liam Neeson in the title role. Collins's great-grandnephew, Aengus O'Malley, played a student in a scene filmed in Marsh's Library.

In 2005 Cork Opera House commissioned: "Michael Collins- A Musical Drama" by Bryan Flynn, which had a successful run in 2009 at Cork opera house and later in the Olympia Theatre, Dublin.

Infamous Assassinations, a 2007 British documentary television series, devoted its eighth episode to the death of Collins. The 2016 miniseries, Rebellion, focused on the 1916 Easter Rising. Collins appeared as a background character, taking part in the uprising, played by Sebastian Thommen. Collins was portrayed by Gavin Drea in the 2019 sequel to Rebellion, Resistance.

=== Songs ===
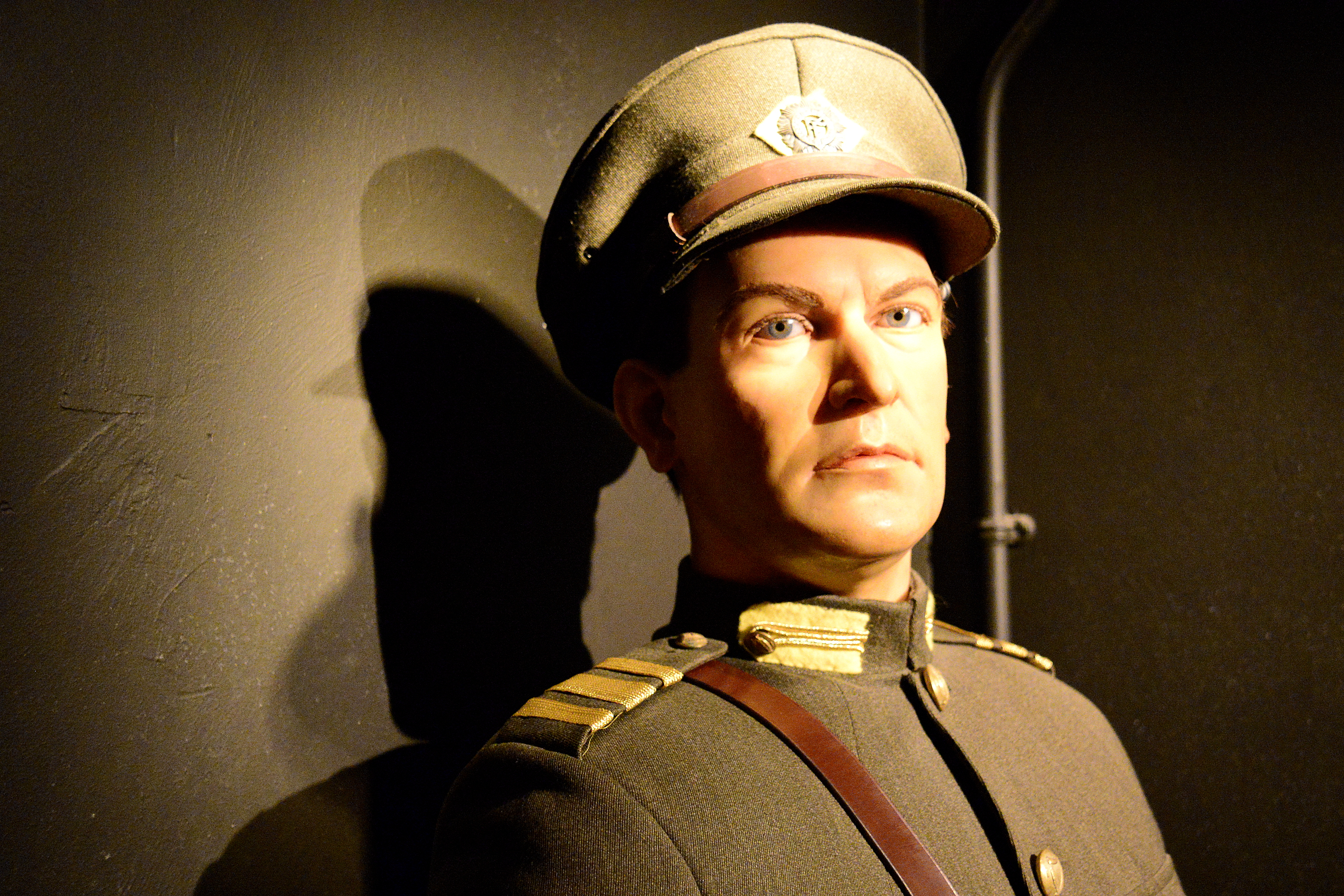
Wax figure of Michael Collins at the National Wax Museum Plus, Dublin, Ireland.

Irish-American folk rock band Black 47 recorded a song entitled "The Big Fellah" which was the first track on their 1994 album Home of the Brave. It details Collins's career, from the Easter Rising to his death at Béal na Bláth. Irish folk band the Wolfe Tones recorded a song titled "Michael Collins" on A Sense of Freedom (1983) about Collins's life and death, although it begins when he was about 16 and took a job in London. Celtic metal band Cruachan recorded a song also titled "Michael Collins" on their 2004 album Pagan which dealt with his role in the Civil War, the treaty and his eventual death. Also a song by Johnny McEvoy, simply named "Michael", depicts Collins's death and the sadness surrounding his funeral.

The poem "The laughing boy" by Brendan Behan lamenting the death of Collins was translated into Greek in 1961 by Vasilis Rotas. In October of the same year, Mikis Theodorakis composed the song "Tο γελαστό παιδί" ("The laughing boy") using Rotas' translation. The song was recorded by Maria Farantouri in 1966 on the album "Ένας όμηρος" ("A hostage") and became an instant success. It was the soundtrack of the movie Z (1969). "The laughing boy" became the song of protest against the dictatorship in Greece (1967–1974) and remains to date one of the most popular songs in Greek popular culture.

=== Plays ===
Journalist Eamonn O'Neill wrote the play God Save Ireland Cried the Hero about Collins's last night alive. Set in his hotel room, the one-man production started Liam Brennan in the role of Collins and was produced by the Wiseguise Company. It was performed at the Edinburgh Festival Fringe in 1996.

Mary Kenny wrote a play Allegiance, about a meeting between Winston Churchill and Collins. The play premiered in 2006 for the Edinburgh Festival Fringe with Mel Smith playing Churchill and Michael Fassbender, a great-great-grandnephew of Collins, playing him.

== See also ==
- Families in the Oireachtas
- F. Digby Hardy
- List of members of the Oireachtas imprisoned during the Irish revolutionary period
- List of people on the postage stamps of Ireland
- List of unsolved murders (1900–1979)

== Bibliography ==
- Llewellyn, Morgan (2001). 1921. Thomas Doherty Press.
- Beaslai, Piaras (1926). Michael Collins and The Making of the New Ireland. Dublin: Phoenix.
- Beaslai, Piaras (1937). Michael Collins: Soldier and Statesman. Talbot Press.
- Collins, Michael (1922). The Path to Freedom. Dublin: Talbot Press.
- Coogan, Tim Pat (1990). Michael Collins: A Biography. Arrow Books. ISBN 978-0099685807.
- Coogan, Tim Pat (2002). Michael Collins: The Man Who Made Ireland. Palgrave Macmillan. ISBN 978-0-312-29511-0.
- Cottrell, Peter (2006). The Anglo-Irish War: The Troubles of 1913–1922. Osprey Publishing. ISBN 1-84603-023-4.
- Deasy, Liam (1992). Brother Against Brother. Mercier.
- Doherty, Gabriel (1998). Michael Collins and the Making of the Irish State. Mercier.
- Dwyer, T. Ryle (1999). Big Fellow, Long Fellow: A Joint Biography of Collins and De Valera. St. Martin's Press. ISBN 978-0-7171-4084-8.
- Dwyer, T. Ryle (2005). The Squad and the Intelligence Operations of Michael Collins. Mercier Press. ISBN 978-1-85635-469-1.
- Feehan, John M. (1981). The Shooting of Michael Collins: Murder or Accident?. Mercier.
- Feeney, Brian (2002). Sinn Féin: One Hundred Turbulent Years. O'Brien Press.
- Hart, Peter (2007). Mick: The Real Michael Collins. Penguin. ISBN 978-0143038542.
- McDonnell, Kathleen Keyes (1972). "There is a bridge at Bandon: A Personal Account of the Irish War of Independence". Cork and Dublin.
- Mackay, James (1997). Michael Collins: A Life. Mainstream Publishing. ISBN 978-1-85158-857-2.
- Neligan, David (1999). The Spy in the Castle. Prendeville Publishing Ltd.
- Neeson, Eoin (1968). The Life and Death of Michael Collins. Cork: Mercier Press.
- O'Broin, Leon (1983). In Great Haste: The Letters of Michael Collins and Kitty Kiernan. Gill and MacMillan.
- O'Connor, Batt (1929). With Michael Collins in the fight for Irish independence. London: Peter Davies.
- O'Connor, Frank (1965). The Big Fellow: Michael Collins and the Irish Revolution. Clonmore & Reynolds.
- O'Donoghue, Florence (1954). No Other Law. Irish Press.
- O'Donoghue, Florence (2006). Florence and Josephine O'Donoghue's Irish Revolution. Irish Academic Press.
- Osborne, Chrissy (2003). Michael Collins Himself. Mercier.
- Stewart, Anthony Terence Quincey (1997). Michael Collins: The Secret File. University of Michigan. ISBN 978-0-85640-614-0.
- Talbot, Hayden (1923). Michael Collins' Own Story. London: Hutchinson.
- Taylor, Rex (1958). Michael Collins. Hutchinson.
- Younger, Calton (1968). Ireland's Civil War. London: Frederick Muller.

=== Historiography ===
- McCarthy, Mark. Ireland's 1916 Rising: Explorations of History-making, Commemoration & Heritage in Modern Times (Routledge, 2016).
- Regan, John M. "Irish public histories as an historiographical problem." Irish Historical Studies 37.146 (2010): 265–292.
- Regan, John M. "Michael Collins, General Commanding‐in‐Chief, as a Historiographical Problem." History 92.307 (2007): 318–346.
- Regan, John M. (2012). "The "Bandon Valley Massacre" as a Historical Problem". History. 97 (325): 70–98. doi:10.1111/j.1468-229X.2011.00542.x.
- Whelan, Kevin. "The revisionist debate in Ireland." Boundary 2 31.1 (2004): 179–205. online Archived 18 February 2017 at the Wayback Machine

Parliament of the United Kingdom
Preceded by John Walsh	Member of Parliament for Cork South; 1918–Aug 1922	Constituency abolished
Oireachtas
New constituency	Teachta Dála for Cork South; 1918–1921	Constituency abolished
New constituency	Teachta Dála for Armagh; 1921–1922	Vacant
Political offices
New office	Minister for Home Affairs; Jan–Apr 1919	Succeeded by Arthur Griffith
Preceded by Eoin MacNeill	Minister for Finance; 1919–1922	Succeeded by W. T. Cosgrave
New office	Chairman of the Provisional Government; Jan–Aug 1922	Succeeded by W. T. Cosgrave
Military offices
Preceded by Eamonn Duggan	Irish Republican Army Director of Intelligence; 1919–1922	Succeeded by Michael Carolan

Dáil	Election	Deputy (Party)	Deputy (Party)	Deputy (Party)	Deputy (Party)	Deputy (Party)	Deputy (Party)	Deputy (Party)	Deputy (Party)
2nd	1921	Seán MacSwiney (SF)	Seán Nolan (SF)	Seán Moylan (SF)	Daniel Corkery (SF)	Michael Collins (SF)	Seán Hales (SF)	Seán Hayes (SF)	Patrick O'Keeffe (SF)
3rd	1922	Michael Bradley (Lab)	Thomas Nagle (Lab)	Seán Moylan (AT-SF)	Daniel Corkery (AT-SF)	Michael Collins (PT-SF)	Seán Hales (PT-SF)	Seán Hayes (PT-SF)	Daniel Vaughan (FP)
4th	1923	Constituency abolished. See Cork North and Cork West							
