= The Diamond Bar =

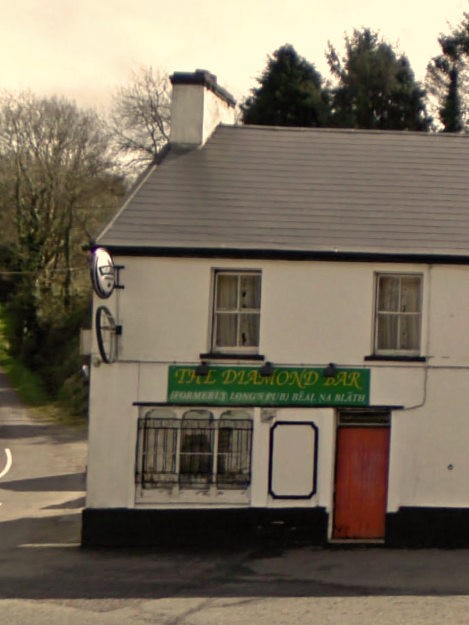
- Pub outside which Michael Collins' convoy stopped at the day of his death.
- Interactive map of The Diamond Bar
- Type: Pub
- Location: Béal na Bláth
- Coordinates: 51°49′18.4″N 8°51′20.0″W
- Built: 1840
- Owner: Eugene O'Callaghan
- Website: thediamondbar.wordpress.com

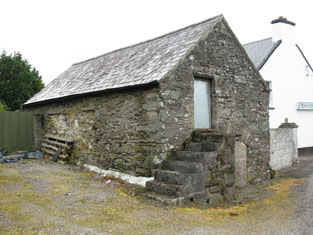
Storehouse behind The Diamond Bar where the ambush in Béal na Bláth was planned.

The Diamond Bar, formerly known as Long's Pub, is a historical site in Béal na Bláth in the townland of Glannarouge (Gleann na Ruaige), County Cork. The ambush that led to the death of the Irish leader Michael Collins was planned in a storehouse behind The Diamond Bar. The Michael Collins Memorial, close to where Michael Collins was shot, is located one kilometre south of The Diamond Bar.

== History ==
During the Irish Civil War, Michael Collins was on his way from Macroom to Bandon, County Cork, on the morning of 22 August 1922. The travelling convoy included a Crossley tender, motorcyclist, armoured car and Michael Collins' staff car. A meeting of Anti-Treaty Republicans had been scheduled for the same day in Murray's farmhouse, behind the Diamond Bar, which is on the road to Bandon.

A chauffeur was hired by Collins' convoy to show them an alternative route, as other roads were blocked due to bridges being destroyed. However, the convoy temporarily lost sight of the chauffeur's car, and as the convoy approached the five crossroads of Béal na Bláth, the convoy's scout leader asked Denny Long (known locally as Denny the Dane) for directions to Bandon. Long recognised Michael Collins in the staff car, and informed Republican Tom Hales that Collins was in the convoy. Hales and others met in a building to the rear of the pub to plan and ambush in the event that Collins returned from Bandon via the same route. Though Éamon de Valera was at Long's Pub that day and some sources suggest he dissuaded against the ambush, plans were set into motion which resulted in the death of Michael Collins.

== Conservation ==
As of 2026, The Diamond Bar remains open. The National Inventory of Architectural Heritage (NIAH) listing describes the building as a "detached three-bay two-storey house, built in 1840, with shopfront to front (north-west) elevation and single-storey extension to side (south-west) [..and..] timber sliding sash windows, attractive tripartite pubfront window opening and render detailing." The Diamond Bar organises Irish road bowling events and tours of the Collins ambush site.
