= The Irish World (London) =

- Type: Weekly newspaper
- Format: Tabloid
- Owner(s): IW Publications
- Founded: 1987; 38 years ago
- Headquarters: London
- Website: http://www.theirishworld.com/

The Irish World is a weekly newspaper for Irish people in Britain and their families. Established in 1987, the newspapers founder and proprietor was Paddy Cowan, until his death in 2020. As of 2012, the editor was Bernard Purcell.

As of 2015, The Irish World was the "official media partner" for London GAA. It also hosted the Irish World Awards until the closure of the Galtymore Dance Hall in Cricklewood in 2008. Those awards were revived at the Novotel Hotel in Hammersmith, for special 25th and 30th anniversary events in 2012 and 2017.

Former editors have included Damien Gaffney, Donal Mooney, and Frank Murphy.

== See also ==
- Irish migration to Great Britain
