= The Irish Post =

Newspaper in Britain

- Type: Weekly newspaper
- Format: Tabloid
- Owner: Elgin Loane
- Founded: 13 February 1970
- Headquarters: Smithfield, London
- ISSN: 0959-3748
- Website: https://www.irishpost.com/

The Irish Post is a national newspaper for the Irish community in Great Britain. It is published every Wednesday and is sold in shops in Great Britain and Ireland.

== History ==
The first print edition of The Irish Post was published on Friday, February 13, 1970. It was founded in February 1970 by journalist Breandán Mac Lua and Tony Beatty, a businessman from County Waterford in Ireland. Thomas Crosbie Holdings (TCH) acquired the paper in 2003.

It went through a brief period of uncertainty in August 2011 when TCH put the paper into voluntary liquidation, citing five years of financial losses as the reason. Following a period of more than six weeks off the shelves, during which staff and supporters of the title launched the 'Save the Irish Post' campaign, the title was bought by Cork-born, London-based businessman Elgin Loane as a going concern. Loane, a publisher who owns a number of titles in Great Britain and Ireland, including Loot and Buy&Sell, re-employed the majority of former staff of the paper at his Loot offices in Smithfield, London. The first edition of the re-launched title was published on 19 October 2011.

The Irish Post website was relaunched in early 2013 as a daily news site for the Irish in Britain. The Irish Post launched a business-focused glossy magazine series in 2013. It includes titles such as Building Britain, Companies100 and In Business.

On 2 February 2017, The Irish Post announced that it acquired the broadcaster Irish TV, only to be closed a month later.

Founder Breandán Mac Lua was the first editor; other editors of the paper have included Donal Mooney who joined as a journalist in 1973, Frank Murphy, Norah Casey, Martin Doyle, Mal Rogers, Siobhan Breatnach and Fiona Audley. Mal Rogers returned as editor in 2022.

== Irish Post Awards ==
The Irish Post hosts the annual Irish Post Awards in October each year, awarded to notable Irish individuals in Britain for successes in the fields of business, entertainment, sport, technology and design. Eamonn Holmes acted as the Master of Ceremonies for the event for many years. Former RTÉ presenter Ryan Tubridy now fulfils that role as of 2025. Award winners have included Michael Flatley, who accepted the Lifetime Achievement Award in 2013 and Irish actor Jonathan Rhys Meyers accepting the Legend Award in 2014. The Irish Post Awards in 2015 honoured Hollywood actress Fionnuala Flanagan, impresario Louis Walsh and footballer George Best.

The 2016 Irish Post Awards ceremony was held in the Great Room at the Grosvenor House Hotel on Park Lane, London. The keynote speaker was the Mayor of London, Sadiq Khan. There were over 1,000 guests in attendance to see Ireland Football Manager Martin O'Neill, EastEnders actor Shane Richie and Premier League winners' Leicester City CEO Susan Whelan.

In 2017, the Awards ceremony was televised live to Ireland on national broadcaster TG4 and Bob Geldof received the Lifetime Achievement Award. Johnny McDaid was honoured with an Outstanding Contribution to the Music Industry Award, and Imelda May won the Artist of the Year Award.

The Irish Post Country Music Awards were broadcast live from the Millennium Forum in Derry on 11 September 2018.

== See also ==
- Irish migration to Great Britain
- Paul Coggins, who has written a column called "Cog's Corner" for the paper
