= Cairo Gang =

British secret agent group in Ireland

The Cairo Gang, officially the Dublin District Special Branch (DDSB) or D Branch, was a group of British military intelligence agents who were sent to Dublin in 1920 during the Irish War of Independence to identify prominent members of the Irish Republican Army (IRA) with, according to information gathered by the IRA Intelligence Department (IRAID), the intention of disrupting the IRA by assassination. It was originally commanded by British Army General Gerald Boyd.

Twelve D-Branch members, including British Army officers, Royal Irish Constabulary officers and a civilian informer (although some victims' links to the British establishment have been contested), were simultaneously assassinated in Dublin on the early morning of Sunday 21 November 1920 by the IRA assassination unit known as The Squad. The operation was a meticulously planned decapitation strike masterminded by Michael Collins. The 14 deaths were the first killings of what was later dubbed Bloody Sunday.

Tim Pat Coogan's biography of Michael Collins asserts that the "nom de guerre" of the British unit derived from a common history of service in the Middle East, but that is disputed by some Irish historians, such as Conor Cruise O'Brien, and it has been suggested that they received the name because they often held meetings at Cafe Cairo, at 59 Grafton Street in Dublin. Earlier books on the 1919–1923 period do not refer to the Cairo Gang by that name.

== Background ==
By 1920, the IRA's Dublin headquarters, under the direction of Michael Collins, had, through assassination and intelligence penetration, eliminated the G Division of the Dublin Metropolitan Police, previously the mainstay of the Crown's intelligence operations against Irish Republicans. The Dublin Castle administration, the headquarters of the British government in Ireland, were forced to look for external intelligence support.

In January 1920, the British Army Intelligence Centre in Ireland formed a special plain-clothes unit of 18 to 20 demobilised ex-army officers, and some officers still on active duty, to conduct clandestine operations against the IRA. The officers received training in London, most likely under the supervision of Special Branch, which had been part of Britain's Directorate of Home Intelligence since February 1919. They may also have received some training from MI5 officers and former officers working for Special Branch.

Army Centre in Dublin hoped these officers could eventually be deployed to the provinces to support its 5th and 6th Division intelligence staff, but it decided to keep the unit in Dublin, at the Dublin District Division, commanded by Boyd. It was known officially as the Dublin District Special Branch (DDSB) and also as D Branch. In May 1920, Lieutenant Colonel Walter Wilson arrived in Dublin to take command of D Branch.

Following the events of Bloody Sunday, 21 November 1920, when twelve D Branch officers were assassinated by the IRA under the command of Michael Collins, D Branch was transferred to the command of Brigadier-General Sir Ormonde Winter in January 1921. Winter had been placed in charge of a new police intelligence unit, the Combined Intelligence Service, in May 1920, and his charter was to set up a central intelligence clearing house the better to collate army and police intelligence. Those members of D Branch who survived Bloody Sunday were very unhappy to be transferred from army command to CIS command and, for the next six months, until the Truce of July 1921, D Branch continued to maintain regular contact with the Army Intelligence Centre while undertaking missions for Winter's CIS.

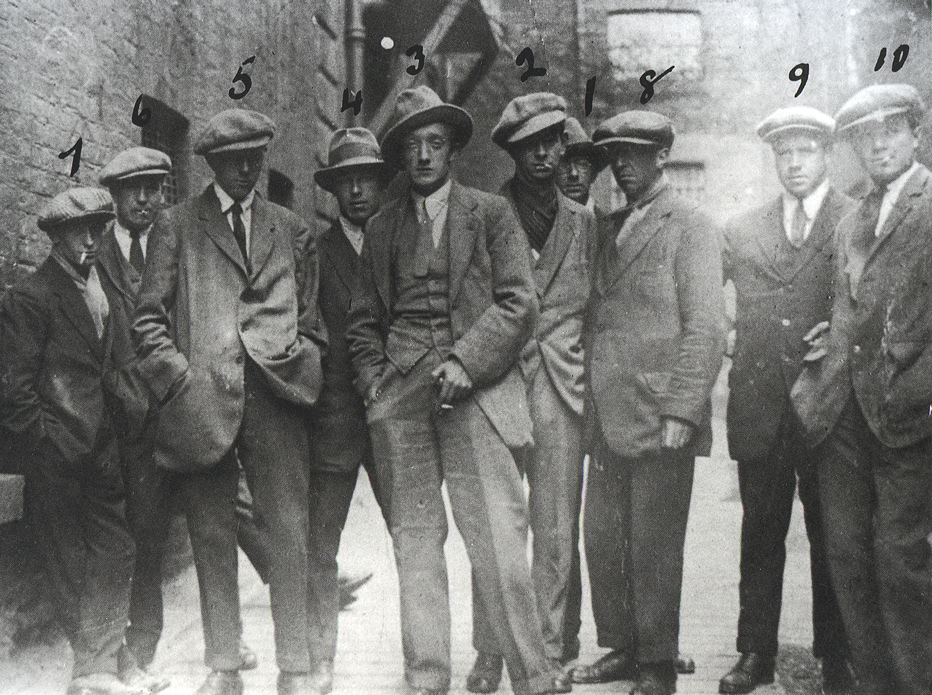
A photo purportedly of the Cairo Gang, but more probably the Igoe Gang

A famous photograph from the Piaras Béaslaí collection that is purported to show members of the Cairo Gang is lodged in the National Library of Ireland's photographic archive (five copies). An inscription describes the men as "the special gang F company Auxiliaries". The men in the photo are numbered, but there are no names or details on the back of the photos. Three other photos in the collection show Auxiliaries posing on vehicles in the grounds of Dublin Castle. Those three photos are similarly numbered.

The IRA Intelligence Department (IRAID) was receiving information from numerous well-placed sources, including Lily Mernin, who was the confidential code clerk for British Army Intelligence Centre in Parkgate Street and Sergeant Jerry Mannix, stationed in Donnybrook. Mannix provided the IRAID with a list of names and addresses of all the members of the Cairo Gang. Collins's case officers on the intelligence staff – Liam Tobin, Tom Cullen and Frank Thornton – were meeting with several D Branch officers nightly, pretending to be informers.

Another IRA source, participating in the nightly repartee with the D Branch men at Cafe Cairo, Rabiatti's Saloon, and Kidds Back Pub, was Dublin Metropolitan Police Detective Constable David Neligan, one of several moles Collins had recruited to infiltrate the G-Division. The IRA recruited most of the Irish domestic servants who worked in the rooming houses where the D Branch officers lived, and all of their comings and goings were reported to Collins's staff.

All the members of the D Branch were under IRA surveillance for several weeks, and intelligence was gathered from sympathisers, for example, who was coming home at strange hours, thereby indicating that they were allowed to violate the military curfew. The IRA Dublin Brigade and the IRAID then pooled their resources and intelligence to draw up a hit list of suspected Cairo Gang members, and set the date for the assassinations to be carried out as 21 November 1920, at 9:00 a.m.

== Assassinations ==
The operation was planned by several senior IRA members, including Michael Collins, Dick McKee, Liam Tobin, Peadar Clancy, Tom Cullen, Frank Thornton and Oscar Traynor. The killings were planned to coincide with a Gaelic football match between Dublin and Tipperary, because the large crowds around Dublin would allow the members of The Squad to move about more easily, and make it more difficult for the British to detect them before and after they carried out the assassinations.

Clancy and McKee were picked up by Crown forces on the evening of Saturday, 20 November. They were tortured and later shot dead "while trying to escape". Tortured and killed with them was Conor Clune, the nephew of Archbishop Clune of Perth, who had been senior chaplain to the Catholic members of the Australian Imperial Force in World War I. Clune was manager of the seed and plant nursery owned by Edward MacLysaght near Quin. Clune and MacLysaght travelled to Dublin on the morning of Saturday, 20 November 1920, bringing with him the books of the Raheen Co-op for its annual audit. Clune was arrested in a raid on Vaughan's Hotel in Dublin, where he was a registered guest.

=== 28 Pembroke Street Upper ===
At 9:00 a.m., members of the Squad entered 28 Pembroke Street. The first British agents to die were Major Charles Milne Cholmeley Dowling and Captain Leonard Price. Andy Cooney of the Dublin Brigade removed documents from their rooms.

Captain Brian Christopher Headlam Keenlyside, Colonel Wilfrid Woodcock and Lieutenant-Colonel Hugh Montgomery were also killed. Woodcock was not connected with intelligence and had walked into a confrontation on the first floor of the Pembroke Street house, as he was preparing to leave to command a regimental parade at army headquarters. He was in his military uniform. When he shouted to warn the other five British officers living in the house, he was shot in the shoulder and back, but survived.

As Keenlyside was about to be shot, a struggle ensued between his wife and Mick O'Hanlon. The leader of the unit, Mick Flanagan, arrived, pushed Mrs Keenlyside out of the way and shot her husband.

=== 119 Morehampton Road ===
At 119 Morehampton Road, Donnybrook, 2.3 km from the scene of the first shootings, another member of the Cairo Gang, Lieutenant Donald Lewis MacLean, along with a suspected informer, T. H. Smith and MacLean's brother-in-law, John Caldow, were taken into the hallway and about to be shot. MacLean asked that they not be shot in front of his wife. The three were taken to an unused bedroom and shot. Caldow survived his wounds and fled to his home in Scotland.

=== 92 Lower Baggot Street ===
Just 800 metres away, at 92 Lower Baggot Street, another Gang member, Captain William Frederick Newberry, and his wife, heard their front door come crashing down and blockaded themselves into their bedroom. Newberry rushed for his window to try to escape but was shot while climbing out by Bill Stapleton and Joe Leonard, after they had broken the door down.

=== 38 Upper Mount Street ===
Two key members of the Gang, Lieutenant Peter Ashmun Ames and Captain George Bennett, were made to stand facing the wall on a bed in a downstairs rear bedroom and shot by Vinny Byrne and others in his squad. A maid had let the attackers into 38 Upper Mount Street and indicated, at gunpoint, the rooms occupied by the two targeted men. Despite many accounts to the contrary, Byrne was not involved in the killings in Morehampton Road that morning.

=== 28 Earlsfort Terrace ===
Sergeant John J Fitzgerald, of the Royal Irish Constabulary, also known as "Captain Fitzgerald" or "Captain Fitzpatrick", whose father was from County Tipperary, was killed a kilometre away at 28 Earlsfort Terrace. He had previously survived an assassination attempt when a bullet grazed his head. This time he was shot twice in the head. The documents found in his house detailed the movements of senior IRA members.

=== 22 Lower Mount Street ===
An IRA unit led by Tom Keogh entered 22 Lower Mount Street to kill Lieutenant Henry Angliss, alias Patrick Mahon and Lieutenant Charles Ratsch Peel. The two intelligence specialists in the Gang, Angliss and Peel, had been recalled from Russia to organise British intelligence operations in the South Dublin area. Angliss had survived an assassination attempt when he had been shot at in a billiard hall. He was targeted for killing Sinn Féin fundraiser John Lynch, mistaken for General Liam Lynch, Divisional Commandant of the 1st Southern Division, IRA. Angliss was shot as he reached for his gun.

Peel, hearing the shots, managed to block his bedroom door and survived even though more than a dozen bullets were fired into his room. When members of Fianna Éireann, who were on lookout, reported that the Auxiliary Division were approaching the house, the unit of eleven men split up into two groups, the first leaving by the front door, the second through the laneway at the back of the house.

=== 119 Baggot Street ===
At 119 Baggot Street, a three-man unit killed Captain Geoffrey Thomas Baggallay, a barrister who had been employed as a prosecutor under the Restoration of Order in Ireland Act 1920 regulations, and who had appeared for the prosecution in military tribunals that sentenced alleged IRA volunteers to death.

=== Gresham Hotel ===
Captain Patrick McCormack and Lieutenant Leonard Wilde were in the Gresham Hotel in O'Connell Street. The IRA unit got to their rooms by pretending to be British soldiers with important dispatches. When the men opened their doors they were shot and killed. A listing in The Times for McCormack and Wilde does not indicate any rank for Wilde – in fact, he was a discharged army officer who had been a British consul in Spain.

McCormack's killing was a mistake. He was a member of the Royal Army Veterinary Corps and was in Ireland to buy horses for the British Army. He was shot in bed and Collins later acknowledged the error. Unlike the other British officers, McCormack, a Catholic from Castlebar, was buried in Ireland, at Glasnevin Cemetery, Dublin.

=== Fitzwilliam Square ===
Captain John Scott Crawford, in charge of motor repair of the British Army Service Corps, narrowly escaped death after the IRA entered a guesthouse in Fitzwilliam Square where he was staying, looking for a Major Callaghan. On not finding their target, they debated whether or not to shoot Crawford. They decided not to shoot him because he was not on their list. Instead, they gave him 24 hours to leave Ireland, although the major left Ireland in no hurry despite that close call.

=== Eastwood Hotel ===
In the Eastwood Hotel at 91 Lower Leeson Street, the IRA failed to find their target, Captain Thomas Jennings. Other targets who escaped were Captain Jocelyn Hardy and Major William Lorraine King, a colleague of Hardy who was missing when Joe Dolan burst into King's room. According to Todd Andrews, Dolan took revenge by giving King's half-naked mistress "a right scourging with a sword scabbard", and setting fire to the room afterwards.

Major Frank Murray Maxwell Hallowell Carew, an intelligence officer who, with Captain Price, had almost cornered 3rd Tipperary Brigade commander Seán Treacy a month before, was on the list. Treacy was killed by G men as he tried to shoot his way out of a trap on 14 October, a week before the day of the Cairo Gang assassinations.

When the IRA came calling for Murray, he had moved to an apartment across the street. He heard the gunfire at his former lodging and fired his revolver at an IRA sentry outside. The sentry was hit and took cover inside the house. The Volunteers moved on.

Several IRA men carried sledgehammers with them the morning of 21 November, because they expected to encounter bolted doors. They did not find any, but T. Ryle Dwyer claims that they used them to smash the skulls and faces of some of the officers they had shot.

Two members of the Auxiliary Cadet Division, Temporary Cadets Frank Garniss, aged 34, and Cecil Augustus Morris, aged 24, were among a patrol of Auxiliaries who responded to the scene of one of the attacks, armed with .45 calibre Webley revolvers and a carbine. Garniss and Morris were shot and killed as they sought to cordon off the rear of one of the scenes of assassination.

A listing in The Times of killed and wounded notes that, in addition to Caldow, Captain Brian Keenlyside, Colonel Hugh Montgomery, Major (Wilfrid) Woodcock and Lieutenant Randolph Murray were wounded. On 10 December 1920, Montgomery died of the wounds he received on Bloody Sunday.

== Fatalities ==
Nineteen men were shot. Fourteen were killed on 21 November. Montgomery died later, making fifteen in all. Five were wounded, including King's mistress. Ames, Angliss, Baggallay, Bennet, Dowling, Fitzgerald, McCormack, MacLean, Montgomery, Newberry, Price, Wilde, Smith, Morris and Garniss were killed.

Keenlyside, Woodcock, Murray and Caldow were wounded. Peel and others escaped. The dead included members of the "Cairo Gang", British Army Courts-Martial officers, the two Auxiliaries and a civilian informant.

== Aftermath ==
Of the IRA men involved, only Frank Teeling was captured during the operation. He was court-martialled and sentenced to hang, but escaped from Kilmainham Gaol. He was later tried for shooting a member of the National Army, and convicted for killing a man for bringing a bag of tomatoes into the bar at the Theatre Royal, Dublin.

Patrick Moran and Thomas Whelan were arrested later and, despite their protestations of innocence and 19 false witnesses attesting to alibis, were convicted and hanged for murder on 14 March 1921.

The remaining Cairo Gang members, along with many other spies, fled to Dublin Castle or England, fearing they were next. Another member committed suicide in Dublin Castle. The deaths and flights dealt a severe blow to British intelligence gathering in Ireland.

== The Igoe Gang ==
Eventually, another group of intelligence operatives, known officially as the Identification Branch of the Combined Intelligence Service (CIS), took the fight to the IRA. The group was known informally as The Igoe Gang, named after its leader Head Constable Eugene Igoe, who was from County Mayo. Igoe reported to Colonel Ormonde Winter.

The Igoe Gang consisted of RIC personnel drawn from different parts of Ireland who patrolled the streets of Dublin in plain clothes, looking for wanted men. The gang posed a serious threat to Collins's apparatus and even caught a Volunteer whom Collins had brought to Dublin to identify Igoe.

The Igoe Gang was accused of using excessive force while interrogating prisoners – prior to his hanging, IRA man Thomas Traynor (a member of The Forgotten Ten) was badly beaten by members of the gang.

The Gang was never penetrated by the IRA. Igoe later conducted secret service operations for Special Branch over many years in other countries, but never returned to his farm in Mayo out of fear of reprisal. Brigadier General Winter appeared on Igoe's behalf to obtain an increase in his pension in view of his many services to the Crown in Ireland and elsewhere.

== See also ==
- Commonwealth War Graves Commission
- F. Digby Hardy

== Bibliography ==
- Todd Andrews, Dublin Made Me, Mercier Press, 1979, p. 153
- Yigal Sheffy, British Military Intelligence in the Palestine Campaign, 1914–1918 (Cass Series – Studies in Intelligence, 1998).
- Michael Smith, The Spying Game (Victor Gollancz Ltd, 1996).
