= Thomas Gay =

Irish Intelligence Officer

- Born: 22 January 1884
- Died: 2 January 1953 (aged 68); Grantham St. Dublin
- Occupations: Librarian, Dublin City Council (1900–1948), Executive, Dublin City Council, Army Officer (Colonel), Irish Free State Army
- Organization(s): Irish Free State Army, Irish Republican Brotherhood, Irish Republican Army, 1916 -21 Club, Crokes GAA Club, Library Association of Ireland
- Known for: Intelligence officer Irish Civil War and War of Independence

Colonel Thomas Gay (22 January 1884 – 2 January 1953) was the handler of a large spy ring working on behalf of Michael Collins during the Irish War of Independence. A commercial clerk by trade he later became an assistant and then subsequently head librarian with Dublin Corporation where he spent most of his career. An early member of the Irish Volunteers and an enthusiast for Gaelic Games he developed a network of important intelligence contacts which he put at the disposal of Michael Collins. As such, he played a critical role in the success of that network.

== 1918 – 1922 period ==
It is likely that Collins' system of counterintelligence owes much in its inception to Gay. It was through his agency that Collins was first put in touch with friendly detectives working inside fhe G Division of the Dublin Metropolitan Police at Dublin Castle. Gay was the handler of Detective Sergeant Ned Broy and Detective Joe Kavanagh, both of whom were employed in the Castle to provide intelligence to Collins. According to Broy, the main liaison with Collins was supplied by Tommy Gay personally. Broy would meet Gay at the back of the Tivoli Theatre or at Webb's book shop on the Quays to pass on information. Gay's position as Librarian at Capel Street Library in Dublin during this period made him readily accessible, when required.

His home at 8 Haddon Road, Clontarf was a regular, often weekly, meeting place for Collins, Broy, Kavanagh, David Neligan, James Mc Namara and on occasion Sean O'Duffy and Harry Boland. Neligan described Gay as "a staunch friend of Collins and so was his wife who was a noble woman".

On 17 – 18 May 1918, Gay secured details from Detective Kavanagh, about the plans of the British in response to the so-called German Plot and passed the information to Boland who informed Collins and the Government. The "Plot", which was intended to justify arresting all members of the newly formed Provisional Government by the British, was partially successful – despite the advance warning, due to failure of some Cabinet members to take the information seriously.

== Participation in 1916 ==
Thomas Gay joined the Irish Volunteers on 20 September 1914, the night following Redmond's Speech at Woodenbridge. He was a member of "A" Company.

He reported to Marrowbone Lane Distillery in Easter week 1916 and was assigned to travel between garrisons keeping lines of communication open and gathering intelligence. His detection of British troops en route to the Distillery, and subsequent warning to the garrison there, resulted in the frustration of the planned British offensive. He later carried news of the surrender from John MacBride in Jacob's Factory to Con Colbert at the Distillery.

Eluding capture, Gay was free to smuggle messages from prisoners and to pass on copies of the Gaelic American, a banned magazine, to them.

== Other activities ==
=== 1916 – 1921 Club ===
He was a founder member of the 1916–1921 Club, that sought to bring together the two sides of the civil war, and its first Honorary Secretary until his death in 1953. He and five others met on 7 December 1942 to establish the club to "cater for members of the IRA and kindred bodies during the years 1916 – 1921". They were especially interested to reach out to those who "for one reason or another were detached from the ideals and associations they had so much identified with in former years".

=== Membership of Crokes Gaelic Club ===
Gay was a member of Crokes Gaelic Club. The club was a recruiting ground for the Irish Volunteers. It is stated by Sean O'Duffy, also a Crokes member, that no fewer than 32 of the club's members were involved in 1916.

Gay chaired a Special General Meeting of the club on 21 October 1916 at which the death during the Insurrection of two Club members was marked. They were Sean Owens and Philip Whelan. The meeting also noted the detention by the British Government of other Club members – Tomas Ua Ceallagh, D. O'Callaghan, Sean O'Brien, Gerald Fitzmaurice, E. Dennany, P. Mc Loughlin, Sean Farrer and others. Arrangements were made to send parcels of provisions to prisoners in Frongach, Wales. Sean O'Dubhthaigh spoke about the objectives of the Club which were non-political and nonsectarian.

Club records show that Gay played hurling for both the Junior and Senior teams in 1905. He was on the team that won the Middle Hurling League and for which he was awarded a gold medal. He held the office of President in 1910, 1911, 1912, 1916 and 1917. At the time, as well as its main purpose of hurling and football, the club organised activities for members, including a Sunday night social, Tuesday night Irish classes, ceilís and lectures. Records show that Frank Sheehy Skeffington and Major Sean Mc Bride addressed the Club in 1912.

=== Camogie League ===
Gay had a particular interest in fostering the game of camogie. He was a founder member of the Dublin Camogie League and its first Hon. Secretary. In 1923, he signed a deed of licence with the Commissioners of Public Works for a playing ground exclusively for camogie in the Phoenix Park. The ground is still in use today.

=== IRA Pensions Committee ===
He was joint Honorary Secretary of the committee and put his energies in the last years of his life towards ensuring fair pensions for Old IRA veterans. A Bill (later the Military Pensions (Amendment) Act, 1953, No. 5 of 1953) to improve these pensions had been published and was before the Oireachtas at the date of his death.

=== Work life ===
He worked initially as a commercial clerk before securing appointment as an Assistant Librarian with the City Corporation in September 1900. His starting pay was 12/- a week. In 1915, he was promoted to Head Librarian in Capel Street. In his later career, he worked as Private Secretary to the City Manager (June 1941) and in the Waterworks Department (October 1944). During the Emergency, he took a prominent part in the organisation of Air Raid Precautions for Dublin City. He retired from the Corporation in December 1948. He joined the Free State Army in 1922 and served as Staff Captain and then Colonel, retiring, on demobilisation of war time strength, on 20 December 1923. He then returned to the Library Service.

He was an active trade unionist joining the Irish Local Government Officers' Trade Union. He served on the executive committee and was ultimately elected president. In 1928, he helped establish the Library Association of Ireland. He was elected to the first executive board and held the position of chairman for three years.

== Personal details ==
Thomas Earnest Gay was born on 22 January 1884, the eldest child of Thomas Patrick Gay and Catherine Coleman. He lived much of his teenage years in a two-room tenement at Little Strand Street, Dublin with his parents and five siblings. Prior to that, the family lived in Eustace Street. He was educated at Synge Street CBS and James Street, Christian Brothers School where he attained all grades, except senior, with honours. During his library service he was awarded the Classification and Library Routine Examinations of the Library Association of England.

He married Eileen O'Shaughnessy of "Mountain View", Grand Canal Bank, Rialto, Dublin on 17 October 1917. They lived at "Ardlinn", 8 Haddon Road, Clontarf. He died on 2 January 1953 and was survived by his three children, Eileen, Kevin and Mary. His wife predeceased him in 1924 when she died of a postpartum infection. After his wife's death, he returned to live with his siblings and his two older children at 11, Sandford Avenue, South Circular Road. He later lived at 15, Grantham Street, South Circular Road.
