= Vincent Fovargue =

Vincent Patrick Fovargue (22 August 1900 – 2 April 1921) was a company officer in the Dublin brigade of the IRA during the Irish War of Independence, who was shot dead in England by the IRA, which accused him of being a British spy.

== Life ==
Fovargue was born on 22 August 1900 at 2 Rutland Place, Clontarf, to Robert Fovargue, an engineer/fitter, and Elizabeth (Lillie) Larkin.

An intelligence officer with the 4th Battalion of the Dublin Brigade of the IRA in the Ranelagh area, he was captured by the British Army in Dublin. Under interrogation, he allegedly leaked information that resulted in the arrest of the other members of his unit a few days later. In return for this information, the Intelligence Corps allegedly allowed him to escape during a staged ambush in Dublin's South Circular Road.

This attempted ruse however did not go unnoticed by Michael Collins' many moles inside the Crown's security forces. On the night of the escape, Detective Constable David Neligan of the Dublin Metropolitan Police's "G" Division was on duty in Dublin Castle when McNamara passed him a telephone message on a police form. The message, issued by the British Military Headquarters, stated that a "Sinn Féin" suspect named Fovargue had escaped from three Intelligence Corps officers in a car whilst en route to prison. It gave a description of his appearance and asked that the British Army be notified in the event of his recapture by the Dublin Metropolitan Police.

Joe Kinsella was the I/O of the 4th Battalion. He was temporarily transferred to take care of munitions under Sean Russell for a few weeks and Fovargue was put in his place. From Joe Kinsella's own statement to the Irish Bureau of Military History:

From the outset I personally did not place a lot of trust in him, because on the morning that he took over from me he appeared to me, to be too inquisitive about the movements of Michael Collins and the G.H.Q. staff generally. He wanted to know where they could be located at any time. He said that he had big things in view, and that it would be to the advantage of the movement generally if he was in a position to get in touch with the principal men with the least possible delay. From his attitude I there and then formed the opinion, rightly or wrongly, that he was inclined to overstep his position. I did not feel too happy about him and I discussed him with Sean Dowling. It transpired that my impressions of this man were correct. I told him of two meeting places of Intelligence staff, one of Company Intelligence held at Rathmines Road and one of Brigade Intelligence held at Saville Place. A short time after giving him this information both these places were raided...I was now confirmed in my suspicions that Fovargue was giving away information. He was later shot in England by the IRA.

Neither was Neligan fooled by this, as he explained:

Now if they had said that this man (who was completely unknown to both of us) had escaped from one I.O. it might have sounded reasonable enough. But to tell us that an unarmed man had escaped out of a motor-car in the presence of three presumably armed men was imposing a strain on our credulity. Both of us thought this story too good to be true.

The two men retyped the message and passed it to Collins the following day. Meanwhile, Fovargue had been sent to England where he adopted the alias of Richard Staunton. Fovargue had in fact been sent to England by Intelligence Corps Colonel Ormonde Winter to infiltrate the IRA in Britain.

Sean Kavanagh, a Kilkenny IRA man, claimed that Fovargue was put in a cell with him in Kilmainham Gaol in 1921 in order to try to extract information from him.

== Assassination ==
On 2 April 1921, a boy walking on the golf links of the Ashford Manor Golf Club in Ashford, Middlesex discovered the body of Fovargue, who had been shot through the chest. Discovered near the corpse was a small piece of paper on which had been scribbled in blue pencil the words "Let spies and traitors beware – IRA".

== In popular culture ==
In the Neil Jordan film Michael Collins, Fovargue's assassination is depicted onscreen. Fovargue is tracked down while working out at the golf course, allowed to say the Act of Contrition, and then fatally shot by Liam Tobin (Brendan Gleeson).

== Bibliography ==
- McMahon, Paul (2008). British Spies and Irish Rebels: British intelligence and Ireland, 1916–1945. Woodbridge, UK: Boydell Press. ISBN 978-1-84383-376-5.
- Porter, Bernard (1989). Plots and Paranoia: A History of Political Espionage in Britain, 1790-1988. London: Unwin Hyman. ISBN 0-04-445258-6.
