= Joseph O'Sullivan =

Irish assassin (1897–1922)

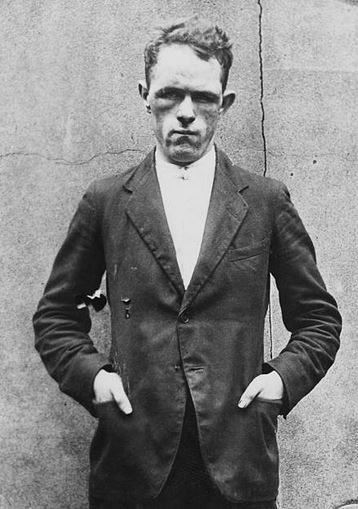
- O'Sullivan before his execution in 1922

Personal details
- Born: 25 January 1897 London, England, United Kingdom
- Died: 10 August 1922 (aged 25) Wandsworth Prison, London, England
- Resting place: Deans Grange Cemetery, County Dublin, Ireland.

Military service
- Branch/service: British Army; Anti-Treaty IRA
- Rank: Lance Corporal
- Unit: Royal Munster Fusiliers; London Regiment; London IRA
- Battles/wars: World War I: Ypres

Joseph O'Sullivan (25 January 1897 – 10 August 1922), along with fellow Irish Republican Army (IRA) (London Battalion) volunteer Reginald Dunne, shot dead Field Marshal Sir Henry Wilson outside Wilson's home at 36 Eaton Place, Belgravia, London on 22 June 1922. Many Irish Republicans believed that this killing precipitated the start of the Irish Civil War (28 June 1922 – 24 May 1923). Convicted by a jury, he was sentenced to death by Mr Justice Shearman. Irish leader Éamon de Valera made a statement on the possible reason for the killing of Wilson: "I do not know who they were that shot Sir Henry Wilson, or why they shot him...I know that life has been made a hell for the Nationalist minority in Belfast and its neighborhood for the past couple of years". (See: The Troubles in Ulster (1920–1922)).

Despite a petition of 45,000 signatures, and a plea for clemency from many prominent figures at the time, including playwright George Bernard Shaw, O'Sullivan and Dunne were hanged for the murder on 10 August 1922 at Wandsworth Prison. The event provided the inspiration for the film Odd Man Out.

O'Sullivan's father, John, was originally from Bantry, County Cork, and had moved to London as a young man where he eventually became a successful tailor. O'Sullivan's mother, Mary Ann O'Sullivan (née Murphy), was born in Inniscarra, County Cork. O'Sullivan was the youngest of thirteen children, all born in London, although only eleven survived to adulthood. As a boy he attended St Edmund's College, Ware. On 25 January 1915 (his eighteenth birthday) O'Sullivan enlisted into the Royal Munster Fusiliers, and later transferred to the London Regiment and served with the rank of lance corporal during the First World War and lost a leg at Ypres in 1917.

On being discharged from the army in 1918, O'Sullivan was employed by the Ministry of Munitions and, when the war ended, was transferred to the Ministry of Labour where he worked as a messenger. The Ministry of Labour was located in Montagu House, later demolished and replaced by the present day Ministry of Defence. Montagu House was located adjacent to Scotland Yard.

He became a member of the IRA detachment in London, and was named by Rex Taylor as being responsible for the execution of Vincent Fovargue as a British spy at the Ashford Golf Links, Middlesex, on 2 April 1921 with a label pinned to his body stating "Let spies and traitors beware, IRA". Fovargue had been an officer in the Dublin IRA.

O'Sullivan's brother, Patrick, the first Vice-Commandant of the London IRA during its early days in 1919 but was seconded to the Cork No. 1 Brigade during the Anglo-Irish War. Patrick O'Sullivan had also served in the London Regiment during the First World War, along with another brother, Aloysius, who was discharged from the army in 1916 suffering from shell shock. Patrick O'Sullivan was also wounded in a gas attack during the First World War. He fought with the Anti-Treaty IRA during the Civil War and was wounded ten days after his brother was executed. Shortly before that, he had crossed over to England to participate in an abortive attempt to rescue Dunne and his brother.

In 1923, John O'Sullivan tried to have the remains of his son and Dunne released for a funeral Mass. But it was not until after the abolition of capital punishment in the UK that Patrick O'Sullivan, with the assistance of the Irish Republican National Graves Association, was able to arrange for the bodies of Joseph O'Sullivan and Reginald Dunne to be sent to Ireland for burial. In mid August 1929 Irish Republicans in London unveiled a plaque commemorating Dunne and O'Sullivan. In 1967, after some political and diplomatic debate by the British and Irish governments, the British Government allowed the bodies of Dunne and O'Sullivan to be exhumed. When the bodies of Dunne and O'Sullivan arrived in Dublin an IRA honor guard marched with the two coffins. They were subsequently reburied in Deans Grange Cemetery, County Dublin, Ireland.

== Alias ==
While under arrest, O'Sullivan was charged under the alias John O’Brien
