= Lenus (Ireland) =

Irish health research repository

Lenus is an open access disciplinary repository managed by the Health Service Executive's Library and Information Service based in Dr. Steevens Hospital, Dublin, Ireland. It is hosted on "Open Repository" and is based on the DSpace open source repository software and digital asset management tool. It provides the HSE with an in-house repository for storing and disseminating its own research and publications as well as acting as a central repository for Irish health and social care research.

== Name ==
The repository is named after Lenus, a Celtic God of healing and well-being which represents the dual purpose of the Repository - it has Irish connections and evokes the study of health.

== History ==
Lenus was launched at the AGM of the Health Science Libraries Group (a section of the Library Association of Ireland) in February 2009. The content of Lenus is ever evolving. It is a repository that contains health related reports, official publications and research on healthcare by authors working in the Irish health system. It also contains a digital archive of former health board materials and health organisations which no longer exist or have been subsumed into new agencies. For this reason, a number of documents have been digitized and were previously not available electronically elsewhere.

Lenus is a repository of Irish health information consisting of published journal articles, official publications of Irish health agencies and some theses by healthcare professionals working in Ireland.

Lenus is also included in the World Wide Science Alliance Portal, is available via the HSE Library website, and is listed in the OpenDOAR directory of online repositories.
