= Vaughan's Hotel =

Vaughan's Hotel, No 29–30 Ruthland Square was a Dublin establishment at the time of the 1916 Easter Rising in Ireland. It provided a base near government buildings where Irish militants could evaded capture while striking against British forces. The building was completed in 1770 by Robert West, a local master builder. More recently it has been a multiple-occupancy residence.

The hotel was an important meeting place for many of the leaders of the IRA and was a safe-house for Michael Collins. A system was developed whereby a flowerpot in the back window signalled danger.

== The hotel raid ==
On 20 November 1920, the Saturday evening before the events of Bloody Sunday. Members of the GHQ staff of the Irish Republican Army, had met to discuss the final arrangements for the elimination of the Cairo Gang the following morning. Having concluded their business, the meeting dispersed; Michael Collins, Peadar Clancy, and Dick McKee went to Vaughan's where they met with Piaras Béaslaí, deputy commanding officer of the IRAs 1st Dublin Battalion and Teachta Dála in the 1st Dáil Éireann. Word was brought to the meeting that Conor Clune from Clare was there to meet Béaslaí.

Clune and Edward MacLysaght had travelled to Dublin that morning. Clune was manager of the seed and plant nursery owned by MacLysaght near Quin and they brought with them the books of the Raheen Co-op for its annual audit. Clune told Mr. MacLysaght that he was to meet the Irish language enthusiast, John O'Connell. In fact, Clune met Béaslaí, an author, playwright, and translator. Clune and Béaslaí parted company, after arranging to meet on the following day.

In the Meantime, hotel porter Christopher Harte had become suspicious of one of the guests, a Mr Edwards, who had made a late-night telephone call, and then left the hotel. He informed the Volunteers, who quickly left the building. Beaslaí, who was familiar with the Hotel's surroundings escaped with the others including Collins. In the confusion, Clune had been overlooked and remained in the hotel. The hotel was raided a few minutes later by British Auxiliaries. Clune was the only one arrested as he was not registered as a guest. This, according to Seán Kavanagh, a member of Collins' IRA Squad, would ultimately cost him his life.

== Aftermath ==
Clancy and McKee would also be arrested in the early hours of the morning in another part of the city, though the Cairo Gang assassination plan was already in motion, for the next day. Upon their arrest, the three men were taken to the old detective office in the Exchange Court. Brigadier-General Ormonde Winter, head of the British Secret Service in Ireland, and two Auxiliary Division officers, Captain Hardy and Captain King, were the personnel who interrogated Clancy, McKee and Clune. They were tortured and later shot dead "while trying to escape". Christy Harte, the porter, came to the attention of the authorities who had noted that he frequently carried Collins' bicycle down the hotel steps to the street. He was arrested in December 1920 and offered £10,000 for information leading to the arrest of Collins.

It was later discovered they were betrayed to the British authorities by Irish former soldier James "Shanker" Ryan, variously described as "a ne’er do well", "a drunken bousey" and "a tout". The Squad, led by Bill Stapleton, later killed Ryan, in February 1921, in a pub near the Five Lamps in Dublin.
