= Eamon Broy =

Irish police commissioner, military officer and sports administrator

Eamon "Ned" Broy
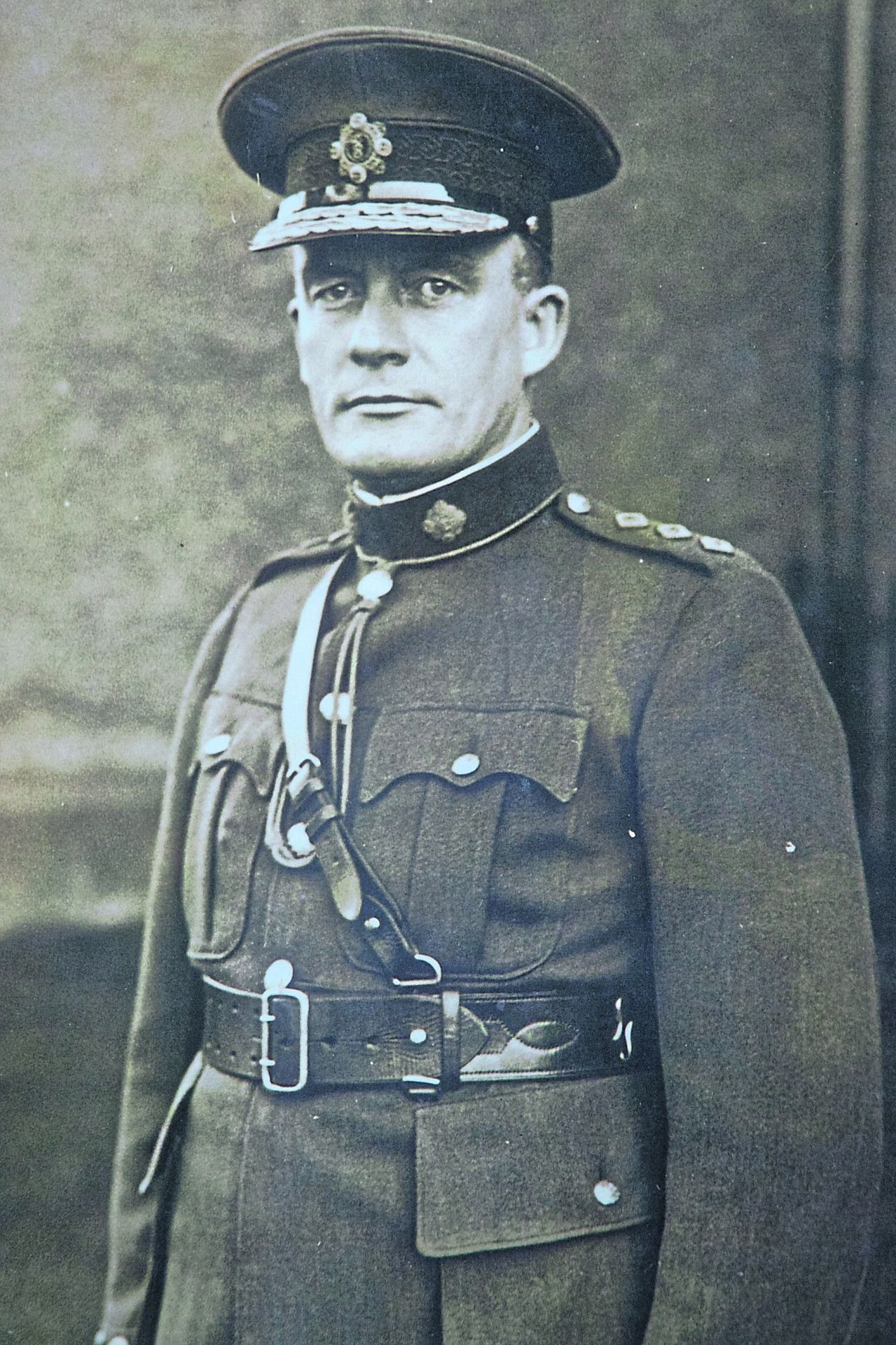
- Broy appearing in a Garda uniform

3rd Garda Commissioner
- In office February 1933 – June 1938
- Preceded by: Eoin O'Duffy
- Succeeded by: Michael Kinnane

Personal details
- Born: 22 December 1887 Rathangan, County Kildare, Ireland
- Died: 22 January 1972 (aged 84) Dublin, Ireland
- Nickname: Ned

Military service
- Allegiance: Dublin Metropolitan Police; Irish Republican Army; National Army; Garda Síochána
- Rank: Detective Sergeant (DMP); Colonel (Army); Commissioner (Garda)
- Battles/wars: Irish War of Independence; Irish Civil War

Eamon "Ned" Broy (also called Edward Broy; 22 December 1887 – 22 January 1972) was successively a member of the Dublin Metropolitan Police, the Irish Republican Army, the National Army, and the Garda Síochána of the Irish Free State. He served as Commissioner of the Gardaí from February 1933 to June 1938. He later served as president of the Olympic Council of Ireland for fifteen years.

== Career ==
=== RIC / pre-independence ===
Broy joined the Royal Irish Constabulary on 2 August 1910, and the Dublin Metropolitan Police (DMP) on 20 January 1911.

Broy was a double agent within the DMP, with the rank of Detective Sergeant (DS). He worked as a clerk inside G Division, the intelligence branch of the DMP. While there, he copied sensitive files for IRA leader Michael Collins and passed many of these files on to Collins through Thomas Gay, the librarian at Capel Street Library. On 7 April 1919, Broy smuggled Collins into G Division's archives in Great Brunswick Street (now Pearse Street), enabling him to identify "G-Men", six of whom would be killed by the IRA. Broy supported the Anglo-Irish Treaty of 1921 and joined the National Army during the Irish Civil War, reaching the rank of colonel. In 1925, he left the Army and joined the Garda Síochána.

=== Post-independence ===
Broy's elevation to the post of Commissioner came when Fianna Fáil replaced Cumann na nGaedheal as the government. Other, more senior officers were passed over as being too sympathetic to the outgoing party.

In 1934, Broy oversaw the creation of "The Auxiliary Special Branch" of the Garda, formed mainly of hastily trained anti-Treaty IRA veterans, who would have been opponents of Broy in the civil war. It was nicknamed the "Broy Harriers" by Broy's opponents, a pun on the Bray Harriers athletics club or more likely on the Bray Harriers hunt club. It was used first against the quasi-fascist Blueshirts, and later against the diehard holdouts of the IRA, now set against former comrades. The "Broy Harriers" nickname persisted into the 1940s, even though Broy himself was no longer in command, and for the bodies targeted by the unit was a highly-abusive term, still applied by radical Irish republicans to the Garda Special Branch (now renamed the Special Detective Unit). The Broy Harriers engaged in several controversial fatal shootings. They shot dead a protesting farmer called Lynch in Cork, and when the matter was discussed in the Senate in 1934, the members who supported Éamon de Valera's government walked out. They were detested by sections of the farming community. In the light of this latter history, their name is often used in reference to individuals or groups who attempt to disrupt contemporary Dissident Republicans, such as the remnants of the Provisional IRA.

== Volunteer role ==
Broy was President of the Olympic Council of Ireland from 1935 to 1950. He was also a member of the Standing Committee of the Irish Amateur Handball Association.

== Death and legacy ==
He died on 22 January 1972 at his residence in the Dublin suburb of Rathgar.

On 17 September 2016, a memorial to Broy was unveiled in Coolegagen Cemetery, County Offaly, close to his childhood home. His daughter Áine was in attendance, as were representatives of the government, the Air Corps, and the Garda Síochana.

== In fiction ==
Neil Jordan's film Michael Collins (1996) inaccurately depicts Broy (played by actor Stephen Rea) as having been arrested, tortured and killed by SIS agents. In addition, G Division was based not in Dublin Castle, as indicated in the film, but in Great Brunswick Street. Collins had a different agent in the Castle, David Neligan. Broy is also mentioned and makes an appearance in Michael Russell's detective novel The City of Shadows, set partly in Dublin in the 1930s, published by HarperCollins in 2012.
