= Dublin Carriage Act 1853 =

Act of the Parliament of the United Kingdom

Dublin Carriage Act 1853 (Note: Section 81.)
- Act of Parliament
- Parliament of the United Kingdom
- Long title: An Act to consolidate and amend the Laws relating to Hackney and Stage Carriages, also Job Carriages and Horses, and Carts let for Hire, within the Police District of Dublin Metropolis.
- Citation: 16 & 17 Vict. c. 112
- Territorial extent: Ireland (Note: Section 80 defines the "Limits of this Act" as every place within the Police District of Dublin Metropolis.)

Dates
- Royal assent: 20 August 1853
- Commencement: 1 January 1854 (Note: Section 84.)
- Repealed: 31 January 2013
Other legislation
Amends	See § Repealed enactments
Repeals/revokes	See § Repealed enactments
Amended by	Dublin Amended Carriage Act 1854; Dublin Amended Carriage Act 1855; Dublin Carriage Act 1853 Adaptation Order 1946
Repealed by	Statute Law (Repeals) Act 2013

Status: Repealed

Text of statute as originally enacted

The Dublin Carriage Act 1853 (16 & 17 Vict. c. 112) was an act of the Parliament of the United Kingdom that consolidated enactments related to hackney and stage carriages, job carriages and horses, and carts let for hire within the Police District of Dublin Metropolis in Ireland.

== Provisions ==
=== Repealed enactments ===
Section 1 of the act repealed 13 enactments, listed in schedule (A.) to the act.

Citation	Short title	Description	Extent of repeal
37 Geo. 3. c. 58 (I)	Dublin Hackney Carriages Act 1797	An Act for amending and reducing into One Act of Parliament the Laws relating to Hackney and other Carriages plying in the City of Dublin, its Suburbs and Liberties, and within Seven Miles thereof.	The whole act.
39 Geo. 3. c. 56 (I)	Dublin Police, &c. Act 1799	An Act to amend an Act passed in the Thirty-fifth Year of the Reign of His late Majesty King George the Third, intituled "An Act for the more effectually preserving the Peace within the City of Dublin and the District of the Metropolis, and establishing a Parochial Watch in the said City;" and also to amend One other Act passed in the Thirty-sixth Year of the Reign of His late Majesty King George the Third, intituled "An Act to explain and amend an Act passed in the Thirty-fifth Year of the Reign of His late Majesty King George the Third, intituled 'An Act for the more effectually preserving the Peace within the City of Dublin and the District of the Metropolis, and establishing a Parochial Watch in the said City,' and for remedying the Abuses committed by Pawnbrokers within the District of the Metropolis or Three Miles thereof."	Sections 24 and 25, which amend and explain the said Act of the Thirty-seventh Year of the Reign of King George III.
40 Geo. 3. c. 62 (I)	Dublin Metropolitan Watch and Pawnbrokers Act 1800	An Act for amending and making perpetual the several Laws for regulating the Watch in the District of the Metropolis, and for granting a further Duty upon Pawnbrokers.	Section 4, which enables Informers under the said Act of the Thirty-seventh Year of the Reign of King George III. to be competent Witnesses.
44 Geo. 3. c. 22	Hackney Coaches Act 1804	Local. Declared to be a Public Act. An Act for the better defraying the Charges for preserving the Peace within the City of Dublin, and establishing a Parochial Watch therein.	Sections 4, 5, and 6, whereby Power is given to the Superintendent Magistrate for the said District to license Persons who shall own, keep, or drive any Cart or other Vehicle used in the Business of Persons keeping Dairies, and to make Regulations for the Observance of all Persons leading or driving Carts or other Vehicles within the said District, and impose, inflict, and levy Fines for Breaches of the Regulations so established.
48 Geo. 3. c. 140	Dublin Police Magistrates Act 1808	An Act for the more effectual Administration of the Office of a Justice of the Peace, and for the more effectual Prevention of Felonies, within the District of Dublin Metropolis.	Sections 60, 61, 62, and 63, whereby Power is given, amongst other things, to the Divisional Justices of the Castle Division of said District to issue and sign Licences theretofore exercised by the Superintendent Magistrate under the said Act passed in the Thirty-seventh Year of the Reign of King George III., so far as relates to any Vehicle described in or coming within the Provisions of this Act.
5 Geo. 4. c. 102	Dublin Justices Act 1824	An Act to amend an Act of the Forty-eighth Year of the Reign of His late Majesty, for the more effectual Administration of the Office of a Justice of the Peace, and for the more effectual Prevention of Felonies, within the District of Dublin Metropolis.	Section 21, whereby Power is given to the Divisional Justices of the said Castle Division of said District, or any of them, to make Rules and Regulations for the Stands of Hackney Carriages and the Conduct of Drivers of any Carriages and Horses within said District.
4 & 5 Will. 4. c. xc	Kingstown Improvement Act 1834	An Act for paving, watching, lighting, regulating, and otherwise improving the Town of Kingstown in the County of Dublin.	Section 129, enabling the Commissioners in said Act mentioned, from Time to Time, to appoint proper Places in the Town of Kingstown and the Limits thereof, as defined by said Act, where Hackney Carriages may stand and ply for Hire, and to make such Orders regulating the Number of such Hackney Carriages to stand in such Places respectively, and the Distances at which they shall stand from each other, and the Times at and during which they may stand and ply for Hire, and such other Orders and Regulations for the better ordering and regulating the said Hackney Carriages, and the Drivers or other the Person or Persons having the Management thereof respectively, as to such Commissioners shall seem proper, and from Time to Time to alter, amend, or repeal such Rules, Orders, and Regulations, and to make others in the Room thereof.
6 & 7 Will. 4. c. 117	Kingstown Harbour Act 1836	Local. Declared to be a Public Act. An Act to amend several Acts relating to the Harbour of Kingstown.	Section 37.—That Portion thereof which empowers the Commissioners of Kingstown Harbour to regulate, amongst other Matters and Things, all public Vehicles and Conveyances frequenting the Piers, Wharfs, and Quays of said Harbour, and the Drivers of same. Section 43.—That Portion thereof whereby the said Commissioners are invested with all the Powers and Authorities whatsoever for the managing and punishing of Persons having Charge of Coaches, Cars, Carriages, Carts, Drays, or any other Vehicle whatsoever licensed by the Superintendent Magistrate for the Preservation of the Peace within the District of the City of Dublin, or other Person or Persons qualified for that Purpose in the City of Dublin, which are contained in the said Act passed in the Thirty-seventh Year of the Reign of King George III., or which are contained in any other Act or Acts of Parliament in force in Ireland relative to Coaches, Cars, Carriages, Carts, Drays, or any other Vehicles plying in the City of Dublin, its Suburbs, Liberties, and Environs. Section 47.—That Portion thereof which empowers the said Commissioners to make Byelaws, Rules, Orders, and Regulations for regulating the Conduct and Direction of all Persons who shall frequent the Piers, Wharfs, and Quays of the said Harbour, with Coaches, Cars, Carriages, Carts, Drays, or other Vehicles, and ply the same for Hire.
1 Vict. c. 25	Dublin Police Act 1837	An Act to make more effectual Provisions relating to the Police in the District of Dublin Metropolis.	Section 23.—To prevent negligent or wilful Misbehaviour of Drivers of Carriages in the Streets or Highways.
1 & 2 Vict. c. 36	Kingstown and Dublin Harbours Act 1838	Local. Declared to be a Public Act. An Act to make further Provisions, and to amend the Acts relating to the Harbour of Kingstown and the Port and Harbour of Dublin.	Section 11.—That Portion thereof which enables the said Commissioners of Kingstown Harbour from Time to Time to make, alter, or vary Rules, Byelaws, and Regulations as to them may seem fit and expedient, for regulating the Conduct and Direction of all Persons who shall frequent the Piers, Wharfs, and Quays of the said Harbour, with Coaches, Cars, Carriages, Carts, Drays, or other Vehicles, and ply the same for Hire.
2 & 3 Vict. c. 78	Dublin Police Act 1839	An Act to make further Provisions relating to the Police in the District of Dublin Metropolis.	Section 12, whereby the Divisional Justices of the Police District of Dublin Metropolis are empowered to exercise all such Rights, Powers, Privileges, Jurisdictions, and Authorities as might theretofore be exercised by the Divisional Justices of the Castle Division in relation to Hackney and other Carriages, or the Owners and Drivers thereof, with respect to Offences by them committed.
5 Vict. Sess. 2. c. 24	Dublin Police Act 1842	An Act for improving the Dublin Police.	Sections 11, 12, and 13.
11 & 12 Vict. c. 113	Dublin Police Act 1848	An Act for the further Amendment of the Acts relating to the Dublin Police.	The whole, with the Exception of Sections 1, 2, and 3.

== Subsequent developments ==
The act was adapted for the purposes of the Irish Free State by the Dublin Carriage Act 1853 Adaptation Order 1946 (SR&O 1946/137 (I)), made under the Adaptation of Enactments Act 1922, which substituted references to the Garda Síochána for references to the Commissioners of Police of the Police District of Dublin Metropolis.

The whole act was repealed for the United Kingdom by section 1 of, and the group 5 of part 4 of the schedule to, the Statute Law (Repeals) Act 2013, which came into force on 31 January 2013.

As of 2024, the act remained in force in the Republic of Ireland. Powers for the licensing of horse-drawn carriages in Dublin have continued to rest with the Garda Síochána as successor to the Dublin Metropolitan Police Commissioners, rather than with Dublin City Council. This situation was the subject of debate in Dáil Éireann in 2019, when it was noted that Dublin City Council had no legal basis to make bye-laws for the regulation of horse-drawn carriages given that the Dublin Carriage Acts 1853 to 1855 had not been repealed.
