= F. Digby Hardy =

British bigamist (1868–1930)

Frank Digby Hardy
- Born: John Henry Gooding; 5 April 1868; Devonport, Plymouth, England, UK
- Died: 28 October 1930 (aged 62); Wolverhampton, West Midlands, England, UK
- Other names: Digby Hardy, Frank Hall, A. G. Saville
- Spouse(s): Eliza Willcocks (m.1885–1891); Sarah Shires (m.1891–1918); Annie Parker (m.1918–1930)

John Henry Gooding, alias Frank Digby Hardy (5 April 1868 – 28 October 1930) was an English naval writer, journalist, soldier, career criminal and would-be spy during the Irish War of Independence. Born in Devonport, Plymouth to a middle-class family, he was educated in London before gaining notoriety in his native Devon as a bigamist and a cheque forger. Imprisoned numerous times throughout his life, he was enlisted by British intelligence to capture Irish Republican Army leader Michael Collins in 1920.

== Early years ==
Hardy was born John Henry Gooding on 5 April 1868 in Devonport, the only son of John Rowcliffe Gooding (1837–1908) and Elizabeth Ann Furzeland (1849–1875), although he would later have four half-siblings through his father's remarriage in 1877. His father, a longtime employee of the Royal Navy, enlisted Hardy at the Royal Hospital School, Greenwich, essentially a place of education for children of naval servicemen. The school recommended him to The Royal Observatory, Greenwich in 1883 and he worked under William Christie as a computer until his resignation and return to Devonport in 1884. There he married his first wife, Eliza Ann Willcocks (1865–1954) in 1885 and fathered four children with her. In 1886, he experienced his first term in prison; six weeks for forgery whilst working as a clerk in a store serving Devonport Dockyard. He was granted leniency as he had a young wife and child.

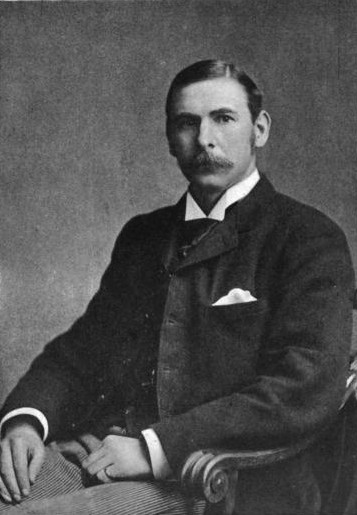
William Christie, 1900.

Joining the Royal Navy in October 1886 as a writer, Hardy maintained an excellent service record until his desertion on 5 July 1888 after misappropriating ship funds. He spent fifty-nine days in the naval prison at Bodmin Gaol, Cornwall before returning to Devonport. Once back, he applied to join the Theatre Royal in Plymouth in 1890, but the attempt was in vain. He sought solace in petty crime and was sentenced to time in Plymouth Prison for the theft of a bicycle and neglecting his family. His 1886 and 1890 stays in prison solicited testimonials from Christie, his old employer, and it was on his recommendation that he was able to join the navy in 1886.

== Life in Surrey ==
After abandoning his wife and children, who were aged between one and five at the time, Hardy left Devonport for Surrey and changed his name in the process. He adopted the alias "Frank Hall" and used this Christian name for the majority of the next four decades. Under this alias, he married Sarah Shires in Hambledon, Surrey in 1891, and fathered three more children with her over the course of the decade. The length and exactness of his relationship with Shires is unknown; his children certainly had contact with their half-siblings from his relationship with Willcocks, but Shires disappears from the records around the turn of the twentieth century.

Under the name Frank Hall, Gooding joined the Army Service Corps on 15 April 1891, citing his maternal grandmother, Annie Furzeland, as his next-of-kin. He attained the rank of Lance-Corporal in 1894, but was dismissed two years later for the theft of money whilst working as an army clerk in Aldershot. He was given twelve months hard labour in 1896 and eighteen months in 1897 for a charge of fraudulently claiming funeral expenses from the non-existent life-insurance of his living wife.

His next period of imprisonment occurred in 1899 when he was identified from his picture in The Police Gazette and held to account for multiple signature forgeries. The trial and subsequent newspaper reports reveal the extent of Hardy's unravelling. His past was completely exposed, back to the abandoning of his first wife and numerous periods in prison. After being held briefly in Holloway Gaol, he was sentenced to seven years in Dartmoor Prison for forgery and bigamy, including making false entries in the marriage register. He had apparently anticipated his detainment, as two loaded revolvers were found among his possessions when he was arrested.

== Release, disappearance and re-imprisonment ==
How much of his seven-year term Hardy served is unknown and his whereabouts for most of the period from 1901 to 1909 are a mystery. His account of the period makes the claim that he was attached to the staff of the Duke of Connaught and later travelled to Toronto, Ontario, Canada where he became a high-profile editor at a news agency before being falsely accused of forgery and returning to Britain. The lack of documentation makes such a claim difficult to prove, although it was a claim he maintained from 1910 until at least 1920. Other accounts of his life from his family state that he talked of how he had lived in the United States for some time and had been in San Francisco for the famous 1906 earthquake. The claim is difficult to verify and should be believed with caution, especially given that the 1906 earthquake's destruction of the city's records was commonly used as a convenient explanation by criminals to forget their past. 1910 saw Hardy's second seven-year term of imprisonment. He forged a cheque using a simple confidence trick which assured a fellow passenger on a train that Hardy had money in America and could afford to repay a loan. Once invited into her Croydon home, Hardy located her cheque book and forged her signature whilst she was out of the room. He was tried under his then alias of Hall Frankland and again served his time in Dartmoor Prison.

Hardy's own account of this period is the only currently known source and details how he had jobs as a journalist at the Daily Mail and Daily Chronicle followed by a job at the Ministry of Munitions for two and a half years before being sacked on account of Scotland Yard coming to hear of his criminal record.

Hardy married for the third and final time to Annie Parker (1894–1980) in Wolverhampton in 1918 under the name Frank Digby Hardy; the couple had four children. Annie Hardy accompanied her husband to Ireland in 1918 where, under the names A. G. Saville and Frank Harling, he conducted numerous frauds and confidence tricks which led to his arrest and conviction under Justice Gordon in December 1918. Initially sentenced to five years' penal servitude, his sentence was later reduced to three years in January 1919.

== Early release and Michael Collins ==
Hardy was released on licence in August 1919 upon successfully petitioning Lord French. His ticket of leave was signed by Ian Macpherson and allowed him to move freely as he wished, although he was mandated to report to a police station at least once a month. He maintained a good character and caused the police no trouble even, he claims, becoming the editor of several religious publications in London. Piaras Béaslaí's papers contain a character reference from the Christian Herald of London which seems to verify this assertion. They contain a letter from the Dean of Westminster to Hardy concerning a job on the staff of Westminster Abbey for which Hardy had unsuccessfully applied.

Claiming he had important and intricate knowledge of IRA arsenals in the Dublin area, he was one of 60 men swiftly enlisted with the assistance of Special Branch in London as a street agent to serve in Ireland against the IRA on behalf of a newly formed "Combined Intelligence Service" (CIS) managed from Dublin Castle from May 1920 onward by Colonel Ormonde de L'Épée Winter. Special Branch was then under the command of Sir Basil Thomson, Director of Home Intelligence (not to be confused with either the Secret Intelligence Service or the British Security Service) and a former British prison governor. It is possible, if not likely, that Basil Thomson knew Hardy quite well from the latter's extended stays in Dartmoor and other British prisons, and that Thomson had personally recruited Hardy for his Dublin assignment, while serving as his London handler. Indeed, in his official after-action report, penned in 1922, Colonel Winter, attempting to run damage control over the ensuing fiasco, claimed that Hardy had not been recruited by "his men," implied that Hardy had been forced upon his unit, and that Hardy was, in fact, a bona fide turncoat, and manifestly ill-suited to serve as an intelligence operative. "His men" was a reference to Inspectors Godfrey C. Denham and Charles Tegart, two senior detectives on temporary loan to Winter from the Indian Imperial Police. At face value, this statement strongly suggests that Thomson personally recruited Hardy for Winter's CIS, and that Hardy's subsequent offer to betray Thomson to the IRA may have been genuine. And it strongly suggests that Basil Thomson handled Hardy personally from London. At a minimum, it does seem that Hardy knew Thomson personally. The training of these 60 agents was carried out at a safe house in England by Denham and Tegart, including training in impersonal communication, principally secret writing techniques. This enabled Hardy and the other 59 agents to send their intelligence reports directly back to a blind cover address in London, before being thoroughly analysed and forwarded by Denham and Tegart to Winter at Dublin Castle by means of official coded wireless messages or in locked courier pouches. This impersonal reporting arrangement eliminated the need for Winter's Dublin Castle staff to directly handle Hardy and others in Ireland, and was intended to protect their informants from being observed by IRA operatives in street meetings with known Irish counterintelligence officers.

Unbeknown to Hardy, however, his correspondence with Lord French had been intercepted by Collins's operatives, who already ordered an investigation and compiled a large file on Hardy's life. Hardy and Parker left for Ireland in September 1920 and stayed in the Phoenix Park Hotel in Dublin, close to the British Military General Headquarters. Through Collins, a meeting between Hardy and Arthur Griffith, the Sinn Féin leader, was arranged. Hardy attempted to gain information about Collins and Robert Brennan with the intention of luring the former to his capture or death. Griffith, however, had filled the room with journalists from respected English, Spanish, Italian, Irish, French and U.S. newspapers who, on Griffith's instructions, posed as the inner circle of Sinn Féin in an attempt to force Hardy's self-exposure. The Irish journalists present were permitted to ask questions (as their accents would not betray the facade). Hardy gave a detailed, if largely fictitious, account of his life.

Griffith's plan worked and Hardy began to engage the room in open negotiations. He offered to betray his handler, Sir Basil Thomson, by revealing a location he was due to occupy within a few days of the meeting. In return, Hardy demanded for the location of Collins, so he might use the information to advance his position within British Intelligence. Hardy promised to withhold the information until Collins was out of danger, but to still pass it on within enough time to protect his new cover as an IRA mole inside British Intelligence. Hardy further explained that his reasons for offering to turn were anger over the harsh treatment he had suffered within the Crown's prison system and the vagrancy he had been forced to endure for the majority of his life.

Griffith then revealed the truth to Hardy; that the room was full of journalists and that his true motives were known to all present. An extract from a 1918 newspaper article was then read to the room which detailed Hardy's thirty-four-year criminal career, followed by the details of his early release from Maryborough Gaol. Griffith then confronted Hardy with a confession he signed in 1918 to numerous confidence scams conducted across England, Wales and Ireland between 1916 and 1918, which had gained him £255 in total (the equivalent of roughly £13,000 in 2010). A visibly shaken and distraught Hardy was then served with an ultimatum by Griffith, to leave Ireland and never return, or stay in Dublin and face the consequences. Hardy left at 9 p.m. that night on a vessel recommended to him by Griffith.

== Motives ==
The exact motives behind Hardy's actions were questioned at the time by Griffith and later by historians of the period. The initial reports from the time in Irish newspapers portray Hardy simply as a career criminal and a rogue recruited by the British government to gain access and information on Collins and Sinn Féin. The view was one-sided in Ireland and across the Atlantic where reports aired which portrayed the incident as a countered threat on the lives of prominent Irish Republicans which was simply motivated by Hardy's potential share in the £40,000 reward for Collins' capture. This was certainly the interpretation which was most promoted for the sake of Irish propaganda.

Hardy himself stated during his meeting with Griffith and the group of disguised journalists that he was an Englishman who had become disillusioned with the British government and was willing to betray it for the Republican cause as revenge for his life of incarceration. The historian T. Ryle Dwyer argues that these were in fact his true aims and his hatred of the English was not believed by Griffith and Collins, who sent him away, believing him to be a threat to the Republican cause. Hardy's true intentions remain ambiguous and claims that he sided with either party are undermined by his deceptive history. Although not conclusive, it is worthy of note that there is no record of Hardy supporting any Irish Republican cause before 1920 and he had no family history of such activities. An interesting piece of evidence is to be found in the Irish newspaper reports of the time. It was generally stated among journalists congregated to listen to Hardy that Captain Thomson was a fictitious name and that the true identity of Hardy's commanding officer had been withheld to deceive Irish republicans. It is now known that Sir Basil Thomson was indeed the Director of Intelligence at the Home Office, a detail which—in addition to Colonel Ormonde Winter's official after action remarks on the Hardy case—adds considerable weight to the supposition that Hardy genuinely attempted to betray the British, as it would imply that he freely solicited the information to Griffith.

== The Cairo Gang ==
Hardy's enlistment into the British intelligence services came at a time when membership of the organisation was low and a recruitment drive had been initiated by its leadership for the purposes of action in Ireland during the Irish War of Independence. While several of the most careless and high-profile members of the so-called "Cairo Gang" of British Army clandestine intelligence operatives (MO4x) were assassinated by Collins' Twelve Apostles on Bloody Sunday, Hardy had left for England two months previously, after his own disastrous attempt at espionage, and there seems to be no correspondence to link Hardy with other members of the group. He was, nonetheless, profiled closely by Béaslaí, to whom he was known as "Z499", on Collins' behalf; these sets of profiles are kept in the section housing Béaslaí's papers in the National Library of Ireland.

== Political consequences ==
The New York Times ran the story in a broader piece detailing the likelihood that key members of the IRA and Sinn Féin were marked for death, and the story was heavily covered by the Irish press which used the episode as an effective propaganda tool. Six years later, after Arthur Griffiths' death, Collins' assassination and the Anglo-Irish Treaty, a series of articles charting Collins' life appeared in the Cork Observer, with Hardy being the subject of one section of the serialisation. Political cartoons of the time generally portray the incident as hugely undesirable for the Prime Minister, David Lloyd George, and the parliamentary discussion which followed led to the Chief Secretary for Ireland, Sir Hamar Greenwood, being ridiculed by Irish Nationalist MPs such as Joseph Devlin and Jeremiah McVeagh. A scathing attack on English tactics in Ireland by Annan Bryce, with specific reference to Hardy, was published in The Times in November 1920; this is the only known contemporary mention of the incident in the English press with several English newspapers choosing to ignore many of the British Government's negative activities in Ireland during the period.

The Sinn Féin propaganda people would do such a good job that many Irish people believed that the British had virtually opened their jails for any criminal prepared to serve the Crown in Ireland. This was absurd, but incidents like the Hardy affair lent it credence. – T. Ryle Dwyer

Hardy's superior, Basil Thompson, remained as Director of Intelligence at the Home Office until 1921, when he fell out of favour with Lloyd George and was forced to resign.

== Later years and death ==
Hardy lived out the rest of his life in relative obscurity as a clerk to a watchmaker. He was secretive, even towards his own family to the extent that they did not truly appreciate his origins. He died on 28 October 1930 in Wolverhampton and was outlived by his third wife by fifty years and by his first wife by twenty-nine years. An account of Hardy's meeting with Arthur Griffith and actions in Ireland formed part of a CIA case study on the importance of intelligence in 1969, for the purposes of staff training.

== See also ==
- Timeline of the Irish War of Independence
- List of people claimed to possess an eidetic memory

== Sources ==
- Béaslaí, Piaras (1926). Michael Collins and The Making of the New Ireland. Dublin: Phoenix.
- Dwyer, T. Ryle (1999). Big Fellow, Long Fellow: A Joint Biography of Collins and de Valera. St. Martin's Press. ISBN 0-7171-4084-9.
- Dwyer, T. Ryle (2005). The Squad and the Intelligence Operations of Michael Collins. Mercier Press. ISBN 1-85635-469-5.
- Dwyer, T. Ryle (1990). Michael Collins:The Man Who Won the War. Mercier Press. ISBN 1-85635-625-6.
- Hart, Peter (2002). British Intelligence in Ireland, 1920-21: The Final Reports. Cork University Press. ISBN 1-85918-201-1.
- Hittle, J. B. E (2011). Michael Collins and the Anglo-Irish War; Britain's Counterinsurgency Failure. Potomac Books, Inc., Dulles, Virginia. ISBN 978-1-59797-535-3.
- Kenneally, Ian (2008). The paper wall: newspapers and propaganda in Ireland 1919-1921. Collins Press. ISBN 978-1-90517-258-0.
- McMahon, Paul (2008). British Spies and Irish Rebels: British Intelligence and Ireland 1916-1945. Boydell Press. ISBN 978-1-84383-656-8.
- Ó Ruairc, Pádraig Óg (2009). Blood on the Banner: The Republican Struggle in Clare, 1913-1923. Mercier Press. ISBN 978-1-85635-613-8.
