= Copley Street riot =

1934 riot in Cork, Ireland

- Part of Blueshirt anti-annuity payment campaign
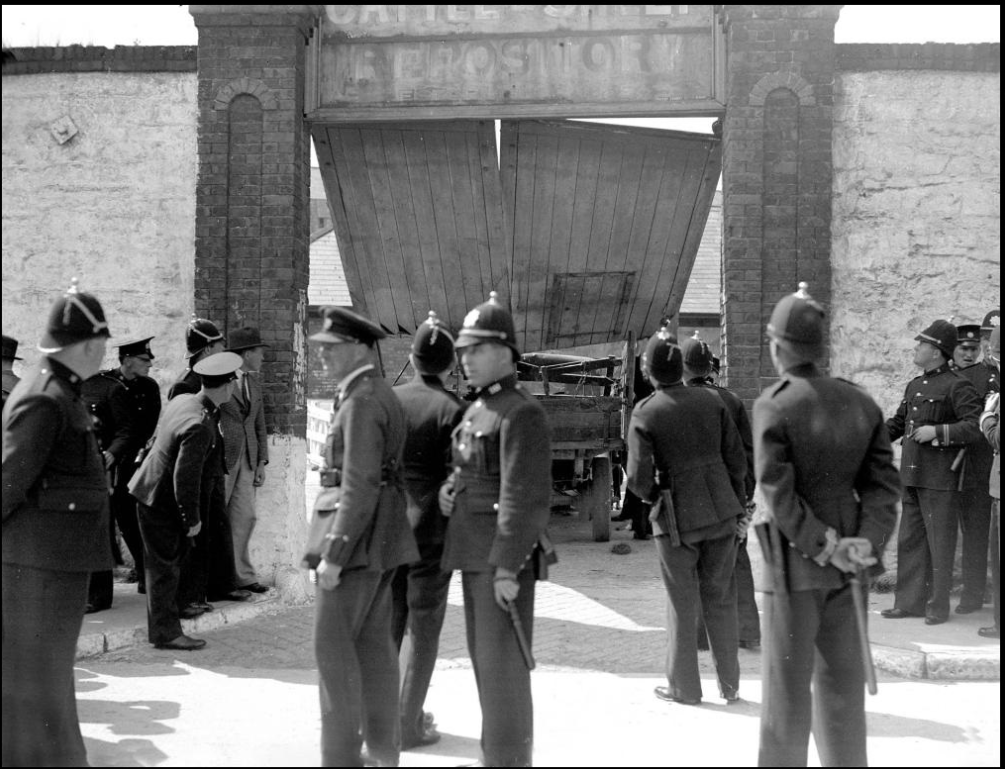
- Aftermath of the ramming of Marsh's Yard, at Copley Street in Cork, on 13 August 1934
- Date: 13 August 1934
- Location: Copley Street, Cork, Ireland; 51.8952°N 8.4665°W
- Caused by: Protest against sale of cattle confiscated for non-payment of land annuities
- Result: Auxiliary Gardaí shot at protestors who rammed a truck through a gate and police cordon

Casualties
- Injuries: 25 injured, one subsequently died of injuries
- Arrested: At least 11

The Copley Street riot occurred on 13 August 1934, at the Copley Street Repository, Cork, Ireland after Blueshirts opposed to the collection of annuities from auctioned cattle rammed a truck through the gate of an ongoing cattle auction. Auxiliary Gardaí, commonly known at the time as Broy Harriers, opened fire and one man, 22-year-old Michael Lynch, was killed and several others injured.

== Background ==
Following the Irish War of Independence (1919–1921), Britain relinquished its control over much of Ireland. However, aspects of the Anglo-Irish Treaty, which had marked the end of the war, led to the Irish Civil War (1922–1923). The aftermath left Ireland with damaged infrastructure and hindered its early development.

Éamon de Valera, who had voted against the Anglo-Irish treaty and headed the Anti-Treaty movement during the civil war, came to power in 1932 and was re-elected in 1933. While the treaty stipulated that the Irish Free State should pay £3.1 million in land annuities to Great Britain, and despite advice that an economic war with Britain could have catastrophic consequences for Ireland (as 96% of exports were to Britain), de Valera's new Irish government refused to pay these annuities – though they continued to collect and retain them in the Irish exchequer.

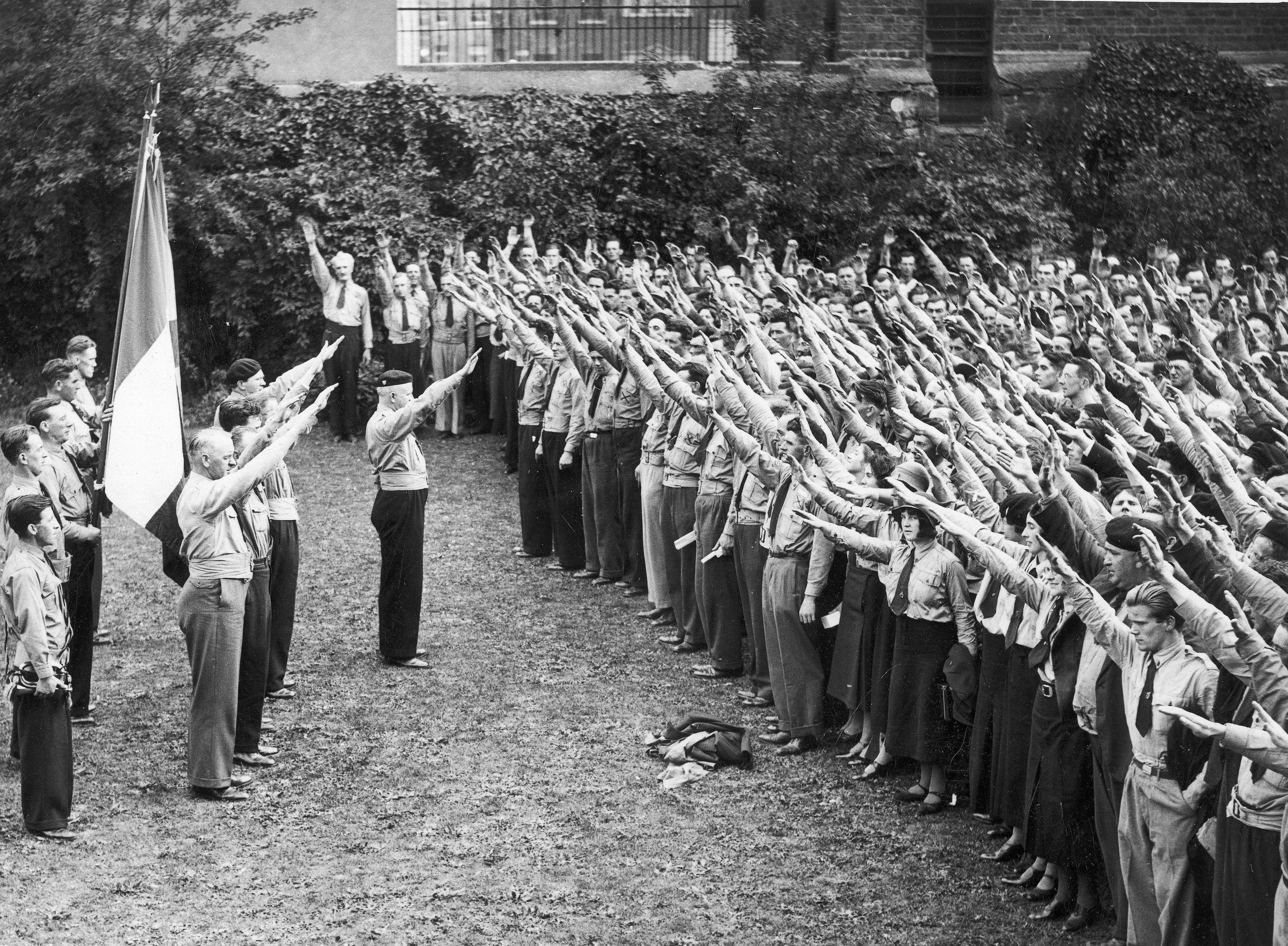
Eoin O’Duffy saluting a group of Blueshirts in the 1930s

This refusal led to the Anglo-Irish trade war (also known as the "Economic War"), which persisted until 1935, when a new treaty, the Anglo-Irish Trade Agreement, was negotiated in 1938. During this period, a 20% duty was imposed on animals and agricultural goods, resulting in significant losses for Ireland. Specifically, poultry trade declined by 80%, butter trade by 50% and cattle prices dropped by 50%. Some farmers were forced to kill and bury animals because they couldn't afford to maintain them.

In 1933, Fine Gael emerged as a political party—a merger of Cumann na nGaedheal and the National Centre Party. Fine Gael garnered substantial support from rural farmers who were particularly affected by the Economic War. They strongly objected to the collection of land annuities by the Fianna Fáil government. The Blueshirts, a paramilitary organisation founded as the Army Comrades Association in 1932 and led by former Garda Commissioner Eoin O’Duffy, transformed into an agrarian protest organisation, mobilising against seizures, cattle auctions, and those tasked with collecting annuities.

== Riot ==
Eoin O'Duffy, a key figure in Irish politics, encouraged farmers to withhold payment of land annuities to the government. Arising from this stance, Gardaí started to seize animals and farm equipment, auctioning them to recover the outstanding funds. While seized cattle were auctioned, local farmers rarely participated. Instead, Northern Ireland dealers, often associated with the name O'Neill, were the primary buyers. These auctions were protected by the Broy Harriers, an armed auxiliary group linked to the police.

By 1934, tensions escalated, and a series of anti-establishment incidents were attributed to the Blueshirts. These incidents ranged from minor acts of violence, such as breaking windows, to more serious offenses like assault and shootings.

On 13 August 1934, an auction took place at Marsh's Yard in Copley Street in Cork, featuring cattle seized from farms in Bishopstown (Coveney) and Ballincollig. The police established a cordon by 10:00 a.m., with 300 officers on duty. Lorries arrived at 11:00 a.m.

Around noon, three thousand protestors assembled. Within twenty-five minutes, an attempt was made to breach the yard gate by ramming it with a truck. According to Oireachtas records, there were approximately 20 men in the truck which they ran against the gate. The Minister for Justice P. J. Ruttledge, said that the truck "with those people in it charged through those cordons of Guards; that several Guards jumped on to the lorry and tried to divert the driver by catching hold of the steering wheel and trying to twist it". Some contemporary news sources suggest that the ramming truck knocked down the surrounding police cordon "like ninepins and crush[ed] a police inspector against a gate". Later sources suggest that the senior officer (a superintendent) was injured in a fall, while attempting to avoid being struck, rather than being hit directly by the truck.

A man named Michael Lynch (wearing the distinctive blue shirt) and approximately 20 others reportedly managed to enter the yard. As soon as they entered the yard they were fired upon by armed "special branch" police detectives who were in the yard. Lynch later succumbed to his injuries at the South Infirmary; 36 others were wounded.

Despite the violence, the auction proceeded after a one-hour delay.

Following the shooting, a riot ensued, but when news of Lynch's death reached the participants, they ceased rioting, knelt, and recited a Rosary.

== Aftermath ==
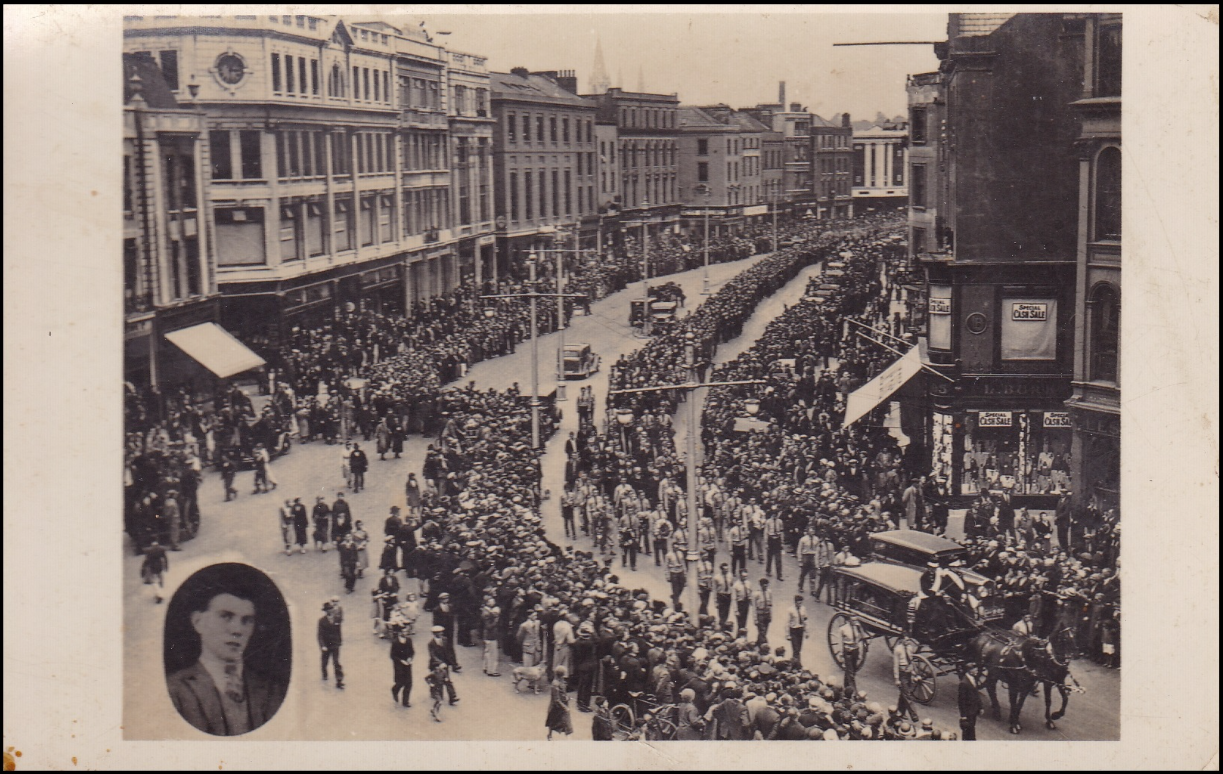
Funeral Procession of Michael Lynch in Patrick Street, Cork - 15 August 1934

The funeral of Michael Lynch occurred on 15 August 1934. The funeral procession was planned to depart from Saints Peter and Paul's Church, Cork at 2:30 PM.

The occasion allowed for a significant show of force for Eoin O'Duffy and the Blueshirts, and featured Roman salutes and military drills. Farmers in Munster reportedly stopped work for an hour, and Blueshirt members asked shopkeepers to close their businesses, as a show of respect for the "martyr". Lynch was afforded a "full Blueshirt burial", and the coffin was adorned with the flag of the Blueshirts (the Army Comrades Association).

According to the Minister for Justice, at the funeral W. T. Cosgrave stood beside O'Duffy as the Blueshirt leader gave an oration saying "We are going to carry on until our mission is accomplished [...] those 20 brave men, whose deed will live for ever, not only in Cork but in every county in Ireland, broke through in the lorry [...] all Blueshirts should try to emulate his bravery and nobleness. Every Blueshirt is prepared to go the way of Michael for his principles".

The court granted the family £300 in 1935. This was appealed to the High Court, followed by the Supreme Court, which dismissed the case. In the Supreme Court, Henry Hanna described the Broy Harriers as 'an excrescence' upon the Garda Síochána.

When the matter was discussed in the Seanad in September 1934, and before a vote was taken to "[condemn] the action of the members of the special branch of the Gárda Síochána [...] on Monday, the 13th August 1934", the senators who supported Éamon de Valera's government walked out.

In August 1940, a memorial was unveiled on the tomb of Lynch in Dunbulloge Cemetery in Carrignavar, County Cork, consisting of a limestone Celtic cross and pedestal. The pedestal is engraved with a quote from the American orator, William Jennings Bryan: "The humblest citizen of all the land, when clad in the armour of a righteous cause is stronger than all the hosts of error".
