= Beatrice Doran =

Irish historian (died 2025)

- Born: Donnybrook, Dublin
- Education: University College Dublin
- Occupations: Librarian, historian, author

Beatrice M. Doran (died 13 October 2025) was an Irish historian, author, and chief librarian at the Royal College of Surgeons in Ireland (RCSI).

== Background ==
Doran was born in Donnybrook, Dublin, where she lived for much of her life. She attended Muckross Park College and University College Dublin (UCD), where she received a Bachelor of Arts and a Michael Smurfit Graduate Business School Master of Business Administration. She also holds a diploma in librarianship. She obtained a PhD from UCD in 2011 with her thesis Knowledge Management: An Empirical Analysis in Relation to Irish Healthcare, which included research carried out at Beaumont Hospital, Dublin.

== Career ==
Doran worked in several libraries, including at Ulster University, University College Cork, and the Royal Dublin Society. She was appointed librarian at RCSI in 1986 where she worked until her retirement in 2007. She served as president of the Library Association of Ireland in 1998.

Doran was a former vice president and council member of Cork Historical and Archaeological Society. She was a member of the Ballsbridge, Donnybrook and Sandymount Historical Society, the Irish Georgian Society, the Royal Society of Antiquaries of Ireland and the Royal Dublin Society. She wrote several books on the history of Donnybrook.

== Death ==
Doran died on 13 October 2025 as The Fern Dean nursing home in Dublin. Her funeral mass was held at the Church of the Sacred Heart, Donnybrook, and she was buried at Dean's Grange Cemetery.

== Bibliography ==
- From the Grand Canal to the Dodder: Illustrious Live (2021)
- Donnybrook Then and Now (2014)
- Donnybrook: A History (2013)
- Knowledge Management: An Empirical Analysis in Relation to Irish Healthcare (2011)
