= Henry Hanna =

Irish barrister and High Court judge

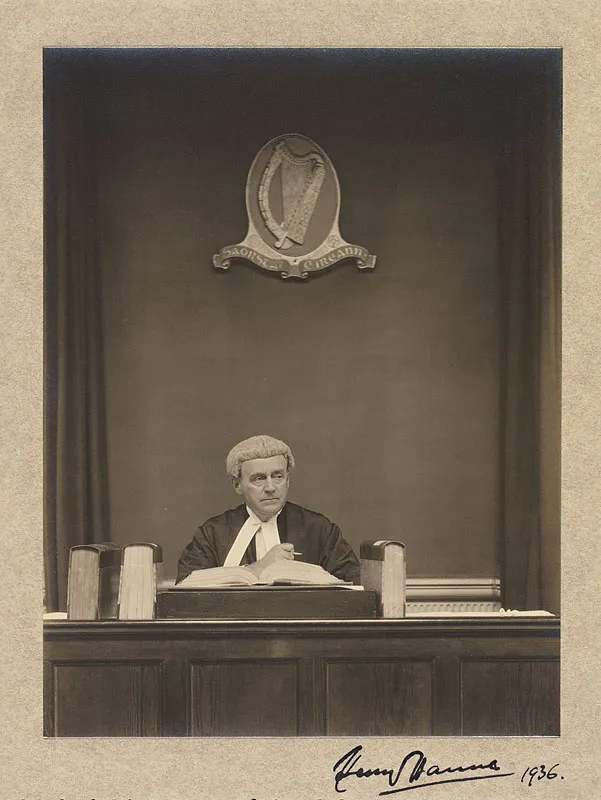
Judge Henry Hanna

Henry Hanna (4 January 1871 – 21 March 1946) was an Irish barrister and later judge of the High Court, author, and photographer. Hanna was born to a Belfast-based Presbyterian merchant family on 4 January 1871. He was educated at the Belfast Royal Academy, Queen's University, and London University.

He became eye-witness to two key events, the Landing at Suvla Bay - about which he wrote his book "The Pals at Suvla Bay" - and the 1916 Easter Rising where we wrote diaries that have been described as a "litany of alarms and rumours circulating around the city, interspersed with his eyewitness accounts of events in his neighbourhood".

== Legal career ==
In 1896, he was admitted to the Irish Bar and became part of the old North-East Circuit. Hanna came to be considered the authority on the Workmen's Compensation Act and its revisions and published his work, "The law of workmen's compensation : with the Irish rules and forms" in 1907. In 1911, he achieved the status of a silk barrister and became King's Counsel and, two years later, was called to the English Bar. As a lawyer, Hanna faced the challenge of managing a substantial caseload due to his successful advocacy, including the defence of James Larkin's co-accused (Larkin opted to defend himself) and, despite his own unionist stance, several Irish Republicans, such as Seán MacEntee and Denis McCullough. He spent several years working on the Irish Law Times with William John Johnston, where he mastered Pitman's shorthand. He served as a member of the Executive Committee of the International Academy of Comparative Law at the Hague. During the Great War, he was made chairman of the Maritime Board, and in 1919 was made Serjeant-at-law. In 1925 and assumed the role of a judge in the Free State High Court, a position he held until his resignation in 1943. During this time, he presided over several notable cases, including: the Seamus Clandillon libel trial (the longest libel action in the history of the Irish courts at the time, running from 29 October to 14 November 1928), the action by the Lynch family following the Copley Street Riot, and the murder trial of those accused of murdering Noel Lemass (brother of Seán Lemass). He was treasurer of the Honorable Society of King's Inns for 1927 and 1928.

== Easter Rising ==
During the Easter Rising, a period he referred to as 'Black Easter Week', Hanna, then a resident of the city, chronicled a series of alarms and rumours that swept through the streets. His personal experiences were intertwined with the unfolding events in his neighbourhood.

On Easter Monday, 24 April 1916, Hanna was on manoeuvres in the Dublin mountains with his battalion of the Volunteer Training Corps, known as the "Gorgeous Wrecks" (a pun on the name of the King, Georgius Rex), when they got word that the city was in the "hands of the rebels". Their attempts to return to Beggars Bush Barracks brought them directly into the line of sniper fire resulting in casualties. Eye-witness testimony written in The Kildare Observer, and Eastern Counties Advertiser on 6 May 1916 states:

"I am myself a member of the Veteran Corps, known in the city as the “Gorgeous Wrecks” (G.R.)... The rifles they have are of an antique pattern. They have no ammunition to use with the rifles—there is not a bullet in Dublin that would fit them, and under these circumstances I refused as I say to invite attack parading useless, antedeluvian [sic] weapons. The G.R's went for a route march on Monday. When the outbreak occurred I was sent to warn them, but they reached Northumberland Street at the same time as did. I was still some distance from the Corps when the rebels opened fire on them from the houses. Four were shot dead and fifteen were seriously wounded. There was, of course, no attempt at defence, and the members of the Corps who escaped took shelter anywhere they could get it. Four of them very pluckily attempted to attend to the wounds of their fallen comrades, and carried some of them to shelter while under fire."

Hanna recognised the immediate danger of being on the street in his uniform and headed for his home at 54 Lansdowne Road. The proximity of Hanna's home to Lansdowne Road station afforded a view, from his attic, from which he could survey the rebel forces as they dug trenches across the railway line, effectively, per Hanna, severing access to the city. The stretch between Lansdowne Road Station and Bath Avenue Bridge became a focal point of rebel activity.

Amidst the chaos, Hanna worked to procure essential supplies for the troops defending Beggars Bush Barracks. Bread and tins of bully beef were sourced, even as the situation grew increasingly precarious. Matters escalated when the rebels commandeered the neighbouring house, heightening the risk of being caught in the crossfire.

On Thursday, April 27, Hanna faced one of the fiercest days of fighting. A near miss—a bullet whizzing past his head—served as a stark reminder of the danger. Residents along Lansdowne Road witnessed the relentless bombardment during daylight hours, seeking refuge on their own doorsteps. At night, the safest place to rest was on the floor, away from stray bullets.

As food supplies dwindled by Thursday, tales of looting permeated the city. The surrender of the Four Courts on Saturday, 29 April, marked a turning point, although skirmishes continued in the suburbs. Hanna's enduring memories of the Rebellion included the city aflame at night, the thunderous cannonade, nerve-wracking sniper fire, and an unwavering compulsion to engage with neighbours and understand the unfolding events.

== Politics ==
Hanna's political affiliations aligned with Lord Middleton, the Rt. Hon. Andrew Jameson (who had created the Irish Unionist Anti-Partition League), and other Southern Unionists who sought reconciliation with Sinn Féin in 1921.

He contested the 1918 general election on behalf of the Irish Unionist Alliance in Dublin St Stephen's Green, coming a distant third to Thomas Kelly of Sinn Féin. Writing in the Irish Independent on 30 November 1918 as a part of this campaign, Hanna voiced opposition to partition which "would be disastrous to the interests of Southern Unionists".

== Other activities ==
Beyond the courtroom, Hanna's interests extended to photography, he was made vice-president of the Photographic Society of Ireland, and canine expertise, he served as the president of the Irish Kennel Club for several years. His written contributions included legal treatises, but it was his book, "The Pals at Suvla Bay," documenting the experiences of the 7th Royal Dublin Fusiliers during the 1915 campaign at Suvla Bay, that showed what his obituary described as his "passion not only for accuracy but for good writing".

From 1930 to 1931 he was president of the Ulster Medical Society.

== Legacy ==
In 2015, the National Museum of Ireland staged a theatre show that focused on the fate of the 7th company of the Royal Irish Fusiliers, young Irishmen who were sent to fight in the disastrous Allied assault on Gallipoli in 1915. The creators drew heavily on the book 'Pals at Suvla Bay', a memorial written by Hanna upon his return from the war, as well as other historical texts.
