= Library Association of Ireland =

Professional body

The Library Association of Ireland (LAI) (Irish: Cumann Leabharlann na hÉireann) is a professional body representing librarians and supporters of libraries in Ireland, founded in 1928. It has membership divisions for different aspects of library work and types of library. It makes professional awards, presents a medal for support of the library sector, administers The Great Reads Award for children's books by debut authors and sponsors one of the Irish Book Awards, for the year's best author or illustrator, based on library nominations.

The association is also a nominating body for the upper house of the Irish parliament, Seanad Eireann.

== Objectives ==
The Association works to develop high standards of librarianship and library information services in Ireland, and increase co-operation between libraries. It also represents the interests of its members in dealings with local governments and the Government of Ireland. The Association provides conferences, courses, examinations and certifications in library science to its members; giving recognition to degrees, diplomas or other professional qualifications in librarianship; it has also conducted courses of study, set examinations to test the proficiency of candidates, and issued diplomas.

The LAI is a Company Limited by Guarantee and operates under Part 18 of the Companies Act 2014. The current constitution of the Association was adopted in 2021; a Working Group was convened in 2023 to examine the Constitution and Rules.

== Membership ==
The Association has personal and institutional memberships. Personal members include professionals and para-professionals in Ireland and abroad, students, and supporters of the library sector. Institutional members include libraries, library schools, corporate and government bodies, institutions and societies.

There is also the Honorary Life Membership and Honorary Fellowship of the Association, for those who have made significant contributions to the library profession and/or to the Library Association of Ireland.

== Governance and groups ==
With no paid staff or secretariat, the operations of the association are divided among committees of volunteers, which are divided into thematic groups, as outlined below.

=== Management ===
The association's ultimate governing forum is its annual general meeting. Strategy and policy are in the hands of the association's council, while day-to-day finance and administration is handled by a management committee. As of 2024, the Association's president is Eileen Morrissey, who is County Librarian, Wexford County Council. The association has no paid staff, but LAI-wide events are organised by workgroups, and more focused events by various divisions, and there is a central communications team, with divisions also issuing communications.

=== Divisions ===
==== Sectoral groups ====
- Academic and Special Libraries Section
- Public Libraries Section
- Youth Libraries Group
- City and County Librarian’s Section
- School Libraries Group
- Government Libraries Section
- Health Sciences Libraries Group

==== Special interest groups ====
- Career Development Group
- Cataloguing and Metadata Group
- Genealogy and Local Studies Group
- Library Publishing Group
- Open Scholarship Group
- Rare Books Group

==== Regional groups ====
- Western Regional Section
- Munster Regional Section

==== Development of the profession ====
- Education Committee: Professional Standards
- Education Committee: Continuing Professional Development
- Literacies Committee

==== Communication and events ====
- Website and social media
- An Leabharlann: The Irish Library (editorial board)
- Libraries Ireland Week taskforce

==== Cooperation ====
- North-South Liaison Committee (with CILIP Ireland)
- Joint Annual Conference Committee

== Activities ==
The association publishes a journal, An Leabharlann – The Irish Library, and organises regular conferences. It participates in annual all-island LAI and CILIP (Chartered Institute of Library and Information Professionals) Ireland Annual Joint Conference. The LAI also organises an annual Library Ireland Week to celebrate libraries.

Since 2016, the School Libraries Group of the LAI, working with the Youth Libraries Group, has administered the Great Reads Award, a prize for children's books by debut Irish authors short-listed by librarians and voted for pupils in primary and secondary schools.

In 2021 the LAI announced that it had agreed to sponsor a category at the An Post Irish Book Awards. The new category, LAI Author of the Year, is awarded to an Irish author whose works contributed significantly to the reader experience and enjoyment of Irish books during the year, as nominated by librarians and library book club members. As of 2026, this award became the Author / Illustrator of the Year Award.

The LAI operates a scheme of three levels of professional award, recognising member progression and achievement..

The association is a nominating body for the upper house of the Irish parliament, Seanad Eireann. It has since 2022 awarded a President's medal to recognise and celebrate an individual who, while not directly working in libraries, has an exceptional track record of promoting libraries and/or issues of interest or concern to libraries. The inaugural recipient of the President's medal was the President of Ireland Michael D Higgins who was presented with the medal at Áras an Uachtaráin on 12 June 2022. The second recipient, in 2023, was Ryan Tubridy, for his work promoting reading and libraries.

In 2019 it was announced that the LAI would host the IFLA World Library and Information Congress in Dublin in 2020. However, in early 2020 this was postponed due to the COVID-19 pandemic until July 2022.

The #ebooksos campaign, highlighting the limitations and restrictions imposed on libraries when sourcing and lending ebooks, was strongly supported by the LAI. In 2022, the LAI, with the Consortium of National and University Libraries (CONUL), the Irish Universities Association Librarian’s Group and the Technological and Higher Education Association Librarians’ Group, published a statement condemning the withdrawal of over a thousand ebook titles from library subscription packages by the publisher Wiley, and the relabelling of key ebook titles as etextbooks which would be sold as a subscription model to students based on class size.

== History ==
=== Previous organisations ===
Prior to the establishment of the Library Association of Ireland, several library associations had existed in Ireland. In 1904, Cumann na Leabharlann was established at Kevin Street Library and was the first publisher of An Leabharlann, from 1905 to 1909. Also in 1904, the Irish Rural Libraries Association was established. There had been a meeting of County Librarians in 1923 at University College Dublin which may have influenced the development of the LAI.

=== Foundation and early years ===
In 1927, library officers in local government held a general meeting with the aim of developing a library service branch of the Irish Local Government Officials’ Union. On 28 October 1928, the Library Service Branch of the Irish Local Government Officials’ Union held an Irish Library Conference at the Mansion House in Dublin, and at this conference, the Library Association of Ireland was founded. The first President of the LAI (from 1929 to 1930) was Dr Robert Lloyd Praeger.

Early Councils of the LAI included representation from many professional bodies, including the National Library, the Royal Irish Academy, the Universities, the Royal Dublin Society and the School of Library Training at University College Dublin. A Liaison Committee was set up in 1929 between the LAI and their colleagues in Northern Ireland after a meeting at the Library Association Conference in the United Kingdom. The School of Library Training at University College Dublin was established in 1928 and a Diploma in Library Training was available. The Constitution for the LAI was approved in 1932. Two sections of the LAI had been established by this time: these were the Library Assistants’ Section and the County Libraries Section.

=== Later years ===
The Presidential chain was created in 1972 and the first LAI president to have their name inscribed on the chain was Seamus Ó Conchubhair of Kildare County Libraries.

== Notable members ==
- Beatrice Doran, former chief librarian at the Royal College of Surgeons in Ireland and former president of the LAI
- Desmond Clarke, librarian of the RDS, editor and biographer
- Thomas Gay, intelligence officer and librarian
- Robert Lloyd Praeger, founding member, first president of the LAI
- Róisín Walsh (1889–1949), Dublin's first chief librarian

== Publications ==
=== An Leabharlann ===
An Leabharlann is the journal of the Library Association of Ireland. A first series of An Leabharlann was published in three volumes between 1905 and 1909 by the preceding body, Cumann na Leabharlann. A new series of An Leabharlann was commenced by the LAI in 1930, with the numbering starting afresh with Volume 1, Issue 1.

Dr Mary Delaney of South East Technological University (SETU) Libraries became editor of An Leabharlann in 2023. The previous editor was Margery Sliney, who held this post for over 14 years.

In the year 2013, the journal became available electronically. As of 2024, the journal has published 32 volumes, with, for many years, 2 issues per annual volume. The most recent issue was that of spring 2024.

=== Books and reports ===
- Accent on Access : Proceedings of an Irish Joint Conference held 19–22 April 1994 in Enniskillen
- Books Beyond the Pale: Aspects of the Provincial Book Trade in Ireland Before 1850
- The Borrowers at School: A Report on Primary School Libraries
- Celtic Connections: Proceedings of the Conference held 4th – 7th June, 1996 in Peebles
- Commitment to Quality: Proceedings of an Irish joint conference held in Cork, 19–23 April 1993
- Consumer Health Information Database Feasibility
- Directory of Libraries & Information Services in Ireland; 5th Ed.
- Information for Health: Access to Healthcare Information Services in Ireland. A Research Report on the Information needs of Healthcare Professionals and the Public
- Libraries – Information and Imagination : Proceedings of an Irish Joint Conference held 25–28 April 1995
- Library Development in Second Level Schools : Seminar Proceedings
- Library File: Making a Success of the School Library
- Public Information in Private Places: Proceedings of the 1997 Annual Joint Conference held in Letterkenny Co Donegal, 22nd – 25th April, 1997
- School Libraries: Guidelines for Good
- Standards for Irish Health Care Libraries and Information Services (2nd ed., 2005)
- Standards for Irish Health Care Libraries
- Striving for Excellence: Proceedings of an Irish Joint Conference held 27th April – 1st May, 1992 in Malahide, Co. Dublin
- Towards the Global Library: Networking Revolution in Action. Seminar proceedings 12–20 March 1992
- Well Read: Developing Consumer Health Information in Ireland

== See also ==
- List of libraries in the Republic of Ireland
