= Ormonde Winter =

British Army general (1875–1962)

Brigadier-General Sir Ormonde Winter KBE CMG DSO
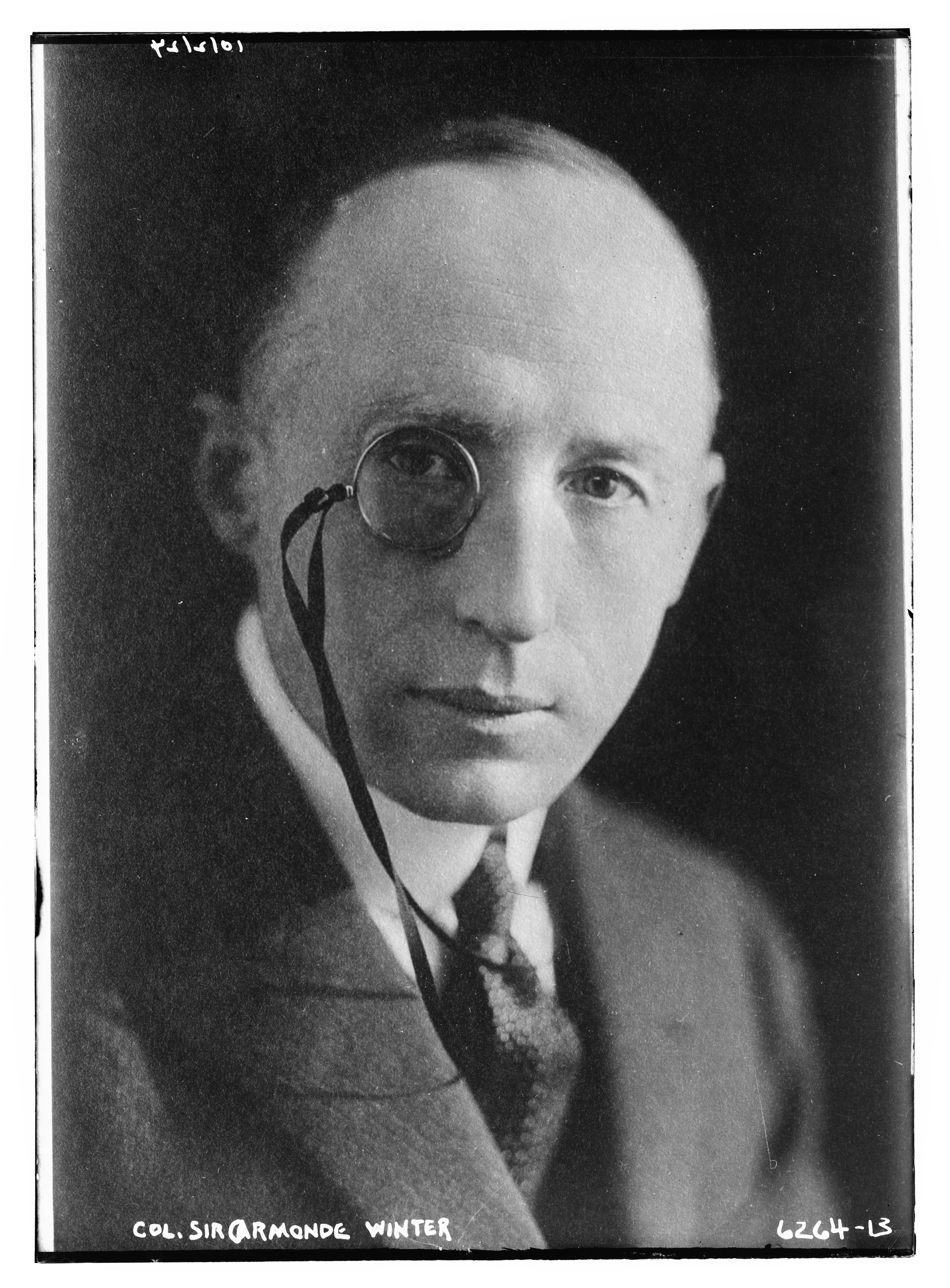
- Nickname: 'O'
- Born: 15 January 1875; Chiswick, England
- Died: 13 February 1962 (aged 87) Worthing, Sussex, England
- Allegiance: United Kingdom
- Branch: British Army
- Service years: –1924
- Rank: Brigadier-General
- Conflicts: First World War; Anglo-Irish War; Soviet-Finnish War for Finland
- Awards: Knight Commander of the Order of the British Empire; Companion of the Order of the Bath; Companion of the Order of St Michael and St George; Distinguished Service Order

Brigadier-General Sir Ormonde de l'Épée Winter, KBE, CB, CMG, DSO (15 January 1875 – 13 February 1962), was a British Army officer and author who, after service in the First World War, was responsible for intelligence operations in Ireland during the Anglo-Irish War. He later joined the British Fascists and fought for the Finnish Army in the Winter War.

== Early years ==
Winter was born in Chiswick on 15 January 1875, the youngest of five sons of a controller of the General Post Office. He was educated at Churchbury House, Great Morden, and later at Cheltenham College, before joining the British Army.

== Service ==
Winter was a Royal Artillery officer and served in India with the 67th Battery at Peshawar and in Ireland with the 131st Battery in County Kildare prior to the First World War. He gained notoriety for an incident in Bedfordshire in 1904, where he and another officer confronted a group of youths who had been harassing them whilst boating, Winter killing one with a single blow from an oar when the boy attacked him with a wooden club. Subsequently charged with manslaughter, Winter was acquitted by the jury on the grounds of self-defence.

== First World War ==
Winter first saw action during the First World War as an artillery officer during the Gallipoli campaign, arriving on W beach, Lancashire Landing, on 29 April 1915 after surviving an attack on his transport, the SS Monitor, from an Ottoman torpedo boat before arriving at the front.

In his autobiography, he recalls turning back a fleeing gun crew at revolver point on 1 May, helping to save a battalion of the Royal Inniskilling Fusiliers from annihilation. Although not a trained intelligence officer, he was noted for his skilful questioning of Turkish prisoners. He would later be put in charge of a 12 pounder field gun nicknamed "Wandering Kate" and would be evacuated on 8 December. Winter later remarked that he enjoyed every minute of his service at Gallipoli.

He would later be deployed to the Western Front, arriving in France as part of the 11th (Northern) Division on 7 September and taking command of the artillery of the 34th Division on 24 October. He would take part in the battles for Messines Ridge on 7 June 1917 and afterwards Passchendaele.

In his autobiography, he recounts escaping death on several occasions and being horrified that the walls of his command bunker were shored up with the corpses of German soldiers.

== Intelligence work in Ireland ==
=== Appointment ===
After the First World War, Winter was working for the Boundary Commission for Schleswig-Holstein (North Schleswig was ceded from Germany to Denmark at this time) when he was appointed in May 1920 by the Secretary of State for War, Winston Churchill, to replace his friend General Tudor as Chief of Intelligence in Dublin Castle, taking a pay cut to accept the position. Winter originally was housed in a lodge outside Dublin Castle and remarked on his unconventional introduction to Ireland when his mess steward shot himself on his first night. Even given Winter's lack of experience in the espionage field, 'O' impressed at the time with his initial reorganisation of heavily centralised departments. Mark Grant-Sturgis wrote of the Dublin Castle regime; "'O' is a marvel, he looks like a wicked little white snake, is as clever as paint, probably entirely non-moral, a first class horseman, a card genius, knows several languages, is a super sleuth and a most amazing original, he can do anything". Winter's detractors claimed him to be obsessed with cloak and dagger operations, at one point donning a disguise to personally seize part of IRA funds. Leadership within the British Army were said to be initially unimpressed by Winter and later exasperated by his slowness in building a nationwide organisation, inability to set up a single intelligence system and by his lack of "an overall perspective."

In his final report to the British Government, Winter listed the following as his main methods of intelligence gathering:

1. Agents obtained by local police and through the agency of 'local centres'
2. Agents recruited in England and sent to Ireland
3. Dublin Special Branch
4. Persons friendly to the Police volunteering information
5. Those persons who gave information whilst under arrest or in prison, with a view to escaping the punishment of their crimes
6. Captured documents
7. Information from ordinary Police sources based on observation
8. 'Moutons' (infiltrators) placed either in prisons or in detention cells with rebel prisoners
9. Listening sets
10. Interrogation of prisoners
11. Censorship of letters of prisoners in jail
12. Scotland House (the address to which anonymous letters were sent)

=== Operations ===
In December 1920, Winter took charge of the 90-strong Dublin District Intelligence Service, known as the "Cairo Gang", possibly named after their meeting place the Cairo Cafe or possibly due to many having served in the Middle East, uniting military and police intelligence for the first time. Amongst his plans was for potential informers to write to a secret address in England, and the net result as he freely admitted was a pile of hoaxes and abusive mail. However, amidst this mass were some valuable nuggets of genuine intelligence. As the conflict progressed, letters were received purporting to come from IRA members who wished to be captured and interned in order to remove themselves from the conflict. He would also import bloodhounds to track fugitive IRA members and recruited female police officers from the Women's Police Service in London to search female prisoners and suspected couriers

One informer for Winter was Vincent Fovargue, an intelligence officer in the Dublin IRA who provided information which led to the arrest of several IRA members. On 31 January 1921, Winter staged a fake escape of Fovargue from custody whilst on a lorry taking him to Kilmainham Gaol. Between February and March 1921, Fovargue would successfully infiltrate the IRA in England, which would suffer over 200 members arrested before the end of the conflict, providing information on their activities to Scotland Yard. His body was eventually found upon a golf course in Staines with the traditional message 'Spies and traitors beware'.

Another was revealed to be a criminal fraud, uncovered not by Winter but by newspaper reporters and IRA intelligence. The IRA allowed this man to live so that he could be uncovered. Other agents were more successful. One quoted led a raid that captured three senior IRA members writing communiques to their subordinates. The agent rewrote the messages summoning all IRA leaders in the district to a meeting where they were arrested. Maintaining his cover as an IRA member, Ormonde was placed into custody alongside them, gaining more intelligence from their conversations in jail.

Amongst Winter's other ideas was 'The Raid Bureau', a 150-strong unit dedicated to analysing the vast amounts of paperwork generated by IRA leader Michael Collins. Collins' dedication to paperwork would to some degree compromise certain activities of the IRA, revealing arms supplies, financial records and even providing lists of IRA members and the identities of traitors within the police. Such documents were more valuable than any informer and could be presented in court as evidence which an informer would be unwilling to do.

From October 1920 to July 1921, 6,311 raids were launched capturing over 1,200 IRA documents, some consisting of over 200 pages and resulting in 1,745 arrests in the Dublin area alone. Upon capturing the IRA's financial records, Winter noted that many contributors were his own Unionist friends, forced to pay protection money.

Another innovation was collecting photographs of IRA members netted as results of raids and the establishment of local centres across the country allowing an exchange of intelligence between areas. Winter claimed to have recruited at least three leading IRA members as informers and many others from lesser ranks. To supplement the Cairo Gang, Winter formed his Identification Squad, also known as the Igoe Gang, named after its commander, Head Constable Eugene Igoe, a policeman from County Galway who had been expelled from Ireland after the Anglo-Irish War. Igoe would later return to Northern Ireland to provide security for US airbases in Northern Ireland from possible IRA sabotage during the Second World War. They were a unit of plain-clothes policemen who had limited success in killing or capturing IRA members, going after young men who fell into their hands on the streets of Dublin. Ormonde personally killed one IRA assassin, sustained a small wound to the hand whilst shooting his way out of an ambush, and captured another IRA man, professing disappointment that the IRA bounty on his head was only £1,000. He met David Lloyd George, briefing him on the nature of the conflict.

=== The Truce ===
During the first months of 1921, Sir Hamar Greenwood and others were declaring that the IRA was "near defeat," critically short of arms and ammunition and with up to 4,500 members interned in addition to hundreds more arrested. However, it quickly became clear that the British Government strategy of combining repression with limited concessions was still not working. Faced with the choice of either waging a war of reconquest or negotiating peace, the government chose negotiation. A Truce was signed in July 1921, and the Treaty in December. This proved acceptable to Irish Unionists and the British Government but caused the Irish Civil War, fought between the pro and anti Treaty IRA forces, breaking out on 28 June 1922.

== Later service ==
After his service in Ireland, Winter was put in charge of the resettlement of former RIC officers abroad, accompanied by police bodyguards and habitually carrying a pistol for 2 years afterwards. Major General Hugh Tudor attempted to have Winter appointed as deputy chief of police for Palestine, alongside many other British veterans of the Irish conflict recruited into the Palestine Gendarmerie. However, the War Office vetoed his request, Winter having been resented by General Sir Nevil Macready and others over his attaining police primacy in intelligence matters over their Army preferred candidate, Lt-Col Walter Wilson. Winter eventually retired from the army in 1924.

In the 1920s, Winter joined the directorship of the burgeoning but badly managed British Fascisti, the first political organisation in the United Kingdom to claim and adopt the "fascist" label, which held several massive rallies -twelve thousand people one time- in London parks. Winter was appointed head of the organisation's intelligence section, taking over from another British secret agent, Maxwell Knight, but eventually did not take up the post, filled by Lieutenant-Colonel Bramley who kept Knight on as his deputy.

The organisation's director was Brigadier General Robert Byron Drury Blakeney, ex Royal Engineers, who was in part responsible for the birth of the extremist Imperial Fascist League. Through mismanagement and scandal, the British Fascisti faded into obscurity in the late 1920s while its membership was swallowed up by other fascist movements in Britain. In his book, Winter makes virtually no mention of this period, possibly on account of the Official Secrets Act.

It was later rumoured that Winter was involved in plots to overthrow the Spanish colonial government in Spanish Morocco and also to stage a revolution for the Slovak minority against the Czech government. In 1940, at the age of 65, he offered his services to the Finnish Army, in their defence against the Soviet Union.

He was honoured for his service with certificates that can be seen in his personal collection in the Imperial War Museum. He spoke five Slavic languages and was a chain smoker. He died peacefully in 1962 aged 87, his obituary reading that he feared neither God nor man.

== Cultural depictions ==
Brigadier-General Winter appears in the RTÉ miniseries Resistance (2019), played by Paul Ritter.

== Works ==
- Winter's Tale, An Autobiography, Richards Press: London, 1955

== Bibliography ==
- Foy, Michael T : Michael Collins Intelligence War (Sutton Publishing 2006) : ISBN 978-0-7509-4267-6
- Hart, Peter: British Intelligence in Ireland: The Final Reports: (Irish Narratives, Cork University Press 2002) : ISBN 978-1-85918-201-7
  Book's cover with image of Ormonde Winter
- Family tree
- Centre for First World War Studies
- Overview of intelligence operations
