= Dublin Metropolitan Police =

Dublin, Ireland police force 1836-1925

Dublin Metropolitan Police Póilíní Chathair Átha Cliath
- Common name: Peelers, bobbies
- Abbreviation: DMP

Agency overview
- Formed: 1836
- Preceding agency: Police of the City of Dublin, Peace Preservation Force, County Constabularies
- Dissolved: 1925
- Superseding agency: Garda Síochána
- Legal personality: Police force

Jurisdictional structure
- National agency: United Kingdom of Great Britain and Ireland
- Operations jurisdiction: Dublin, United Kingdom of Great Britain and Ireland
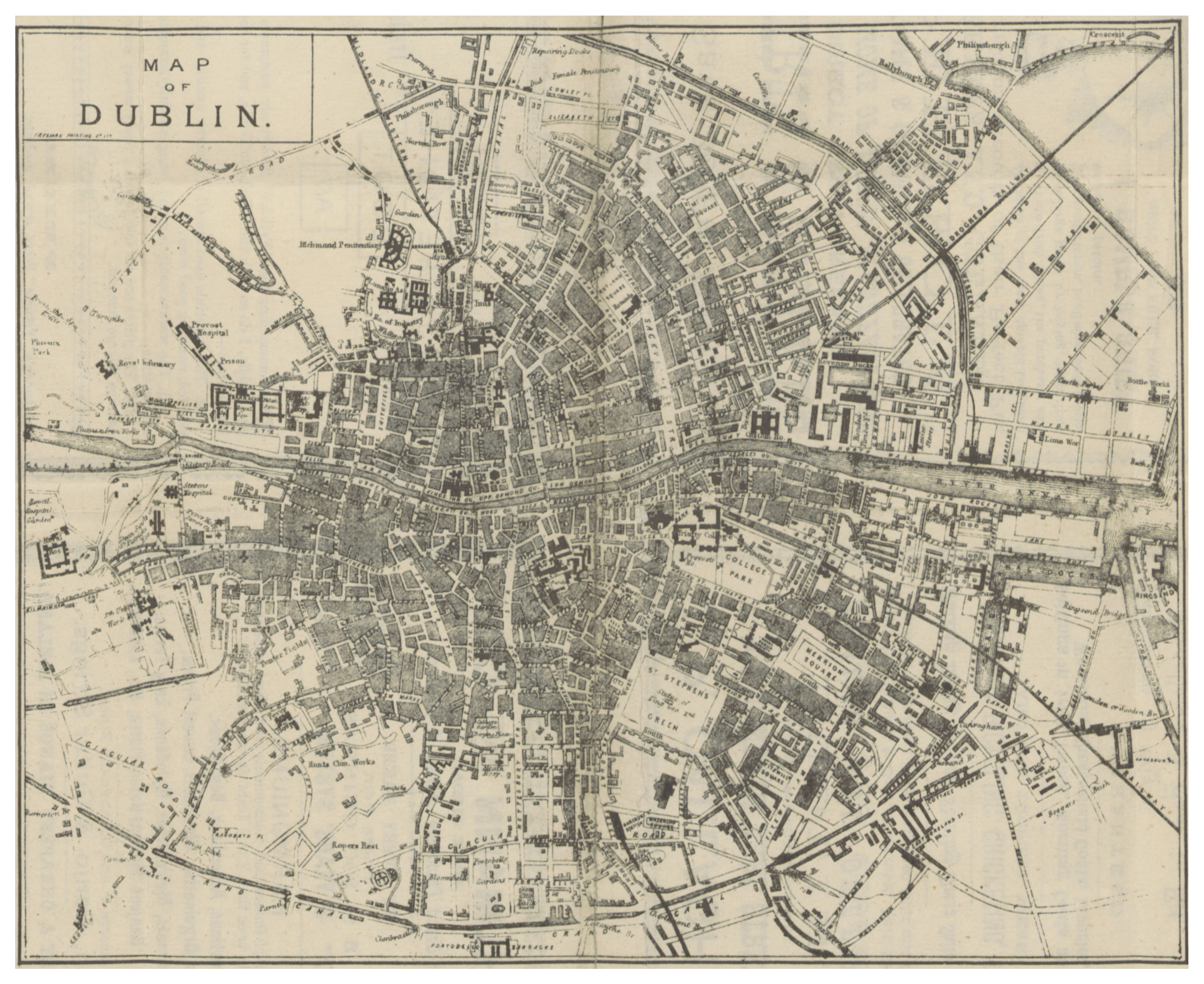
- Map of Dublin city, 1891
- Area: 114.99 km^{2} (44.40 sq mi)
- Population: 233,726 (1841); 304,802 (1911)
- General nature: Local civilian police

The Dublin Metropolitan Police (DMP) was the police force of Dublin in British-controlled Ireland from 1836 to 1922 and then the Irish Free State until 1925, when it was absorbed into the new state's Garda Síochána.

== History ==
Burial site of many members of the DMP, Glasnevin Cemetery.

=== 19th century ===
The Dublin city police had been subject to major reforms by the Dublin Police Act 1786 and the Dublin Police Magistrates Act 1808. Organised rural policing in Ireland began when Robert Peel, then Chief Secretary for Ireland, created the Peace Preservation Force under the Unlawful Combinations (Ireland) Act 1814. This rudimentary paramilitary police force was designed to provide policing in rural Ireland, replacing the 18th century system of watchmen, baronial constables, revenue officers and British military forces. Peel went on to found the London Metropolitan Police.

The Irish Constabulary Act 1822 created four improved "county" constabularies, whose organisation was based around the traditional provinces of Ireland.

==== 1836: reform ====
Dublin Police Act 1836 (Note: The citation of this act by this short title was authorised by section 1 of, and the first schedule to, the Short Titles Act 1896. Due to the repeal of those provisions it is now authorised by section 19(2) of the Interpretation Act 1978.)
- Act of Parliament
- Parliament of the United Kingdom
- Long title: An Act for improving the Police in the District of Dublin Metropolis.
- Citation: 6 & 7 Will. 4. c. 29
- Territorial extent: United Kingdom

Dates
- Royal assent: 4 July 1836
- Commencement: 4 July 1836 (Note: The Acts of Parliament (Commencement) Act 1793.)
- Repealed: 31 January 2013
Other legislation
Amended by	Statute Law Revision Act 1874; Statute Law Revision Act 1890
Repealed by	Statute Law (Repeals) Act 2013

Status: Repealed

Text of statute as originally enacted

Dublin Police Act 1842
- Act of Parliament
- Parliament of the United Kingdom
- Long title: An Act for improving the Dublin Police.
- Citation: 5 & 6 Vict. c. 24
- Territorial extent: United Kingdom

Dates
- Royal assent: 31 May 1842
- Commencement: 31 May 1842
- Repealed: 31 January 2013
Other legislation
Amended by	Dublin Carriage Act 1853
Repealed by	Statute Law (Repeals) Act 2013

Status: Repealed

Text of statute as originally enacted

In 1836, the county constabularies were merged into a new centralised Constabulary of Ireland, and the Peace Preservation Force ceased to exist. At the same time separate non-paramilitary forces were set up in the largest cities: Dublin (at St. Sepulchre's Palace for example), Belfast, and Derry. A perceived lack of impartiality following rioting in the municipal police forces of Belfast and Derry saw both forces absorbed by the national force in 1865 and 1870 respectively, and only Dublin maintained its separate force. The DMP was established under the Dublin Police Act 1836 (6 & 7 Will. 4. c. 29) as an unarmed, uniformed force of one thousand day and night constables. The Castle-controlled organisation was more accountable than the untrained constables and night watchmen it replaced.

The 1836 act authorised the "chief governor of Ireland" to establish a police office in Dublin, supported by two salaried justices, to administer the police force which would be under the direction of the Chief Secretary for Ireland. It also provided for the recruitment and appointment of policemen and the regulation of their conduct. It also created powers of arrest and made arrangements for the financial affairs of the new force, including new taxation.

The DMP was modelled closely on London's Metropolitan Police (DMP). Not only were the blue uniforms of the two forces almost indistinguishable, especially after the police custodian helmet and Bath Star were adopted, but the two forces also had a similar organisational structure; rather than a chief constable, they were commanded by a commissioner, who was not a police officer, but a magistrate holding a commission of the peace. The first Commissioner of the Dublin Metropolitan Police was John Lewis More O'Ferrall, brother of Richard More O'Ferrall. This was descended from the 18th century system of controlling parish constables, and was a sop to the public's fears about the danger of a standing police force under government control.

==== Distinctions between DMP and RIC ====
Unlike the armed and rural based gendarmerie style RIC , but in common with civil police forces elsewhere in Great Britain, the DMP remained a force usually equipped only with batons. The RIC were located in small town or village "barracks", although these were often the family houses of individual constables. In contrast to the green uniformed RIC, the DMP wore dark blue with silver insignia.

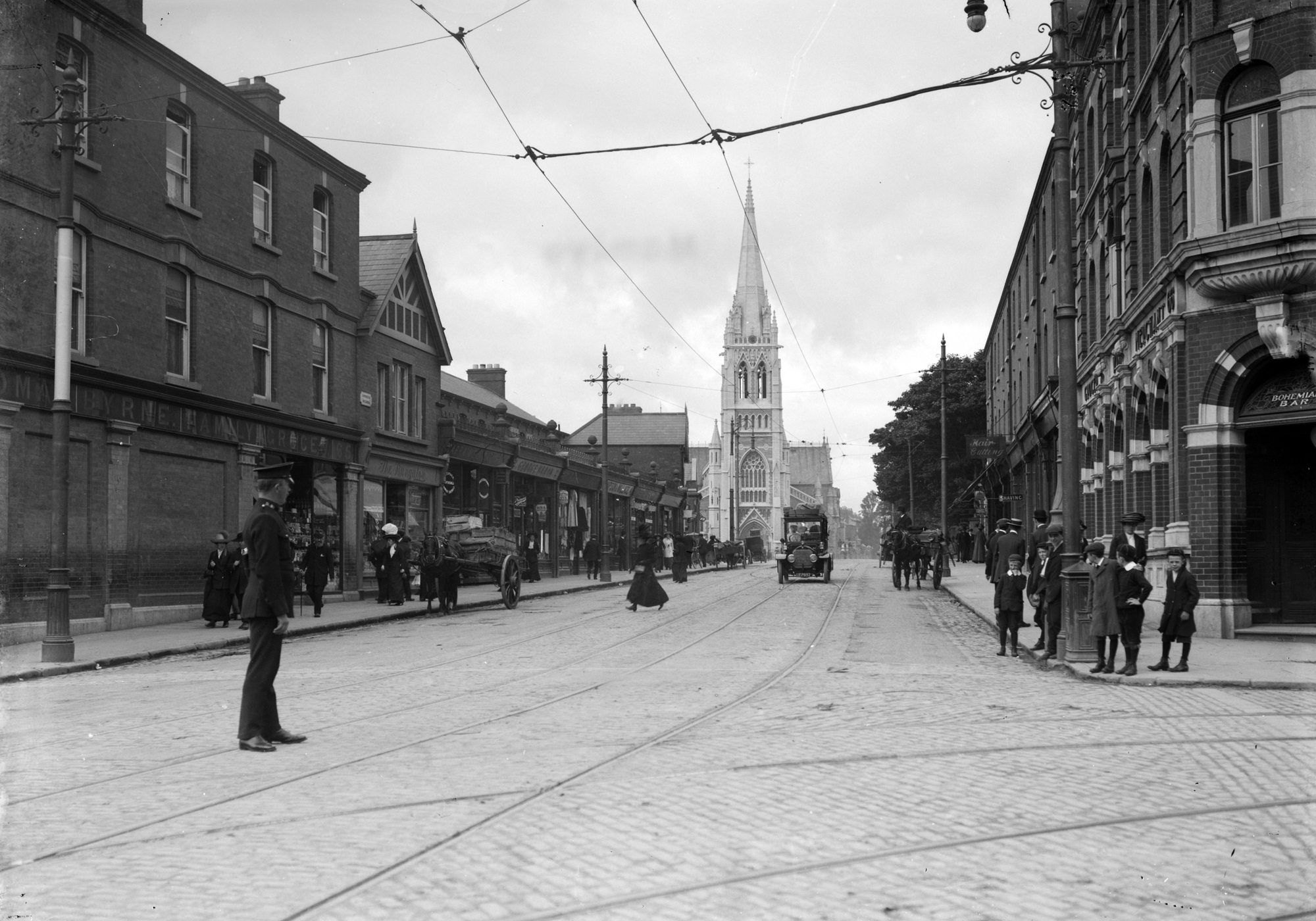
A policeman is about to check an approaching car near Phibsborough.

==== 1880s: Land War ====
The force came under considerable pressure in the 1880s during the Land War, in which 500 policemen were injured. A series of protest meetings were held and strikes were threatened in 1882.

=== 20th century ===
During the Lock-out, the police break up a union rally on Dublin's Sackville Street, August 1913

==== 1913–14: Dublin Lock-out ====
Two men died and several hundred people were injured over the course of the five-month Dublin Lock-out, including two hundred policemen. Although the police were involved in "frequent collisions" with union members and used tactics such as baton charges against them, a vice-regal commission cleared them of wrongdoing after the events – though their reputation had suffered considerably.

==== 1916 onwards ====
The medieval St. Sepulchre's Palace in Dublin had been sold to the mounted division of the Dublin Metropolitan Police and was used as a barracks, becoming the force's headquarters until 1925.

As an unarmed urban force, the DMP did not participate as actively in the Easter Rising of 1916 and War of Independence as did the para-military Royal Irish Constabulary , and as such did not suffer the casualty rate of that para-military force. However DMP Constable James O’Brien (aged 48) was the first fatality in the Rising when he was shot and killed as he denied entry to rebels at the gates to Dublin Castle. A total of three men were killed and seven injured in the Rising. A member of the DMP David Neligan, (who was also an IRA agent), records in his book The Spy in the Castle that the majority of the DMP uniformed personnel observed a neutral role during the ensuing "Time of the Troubles" from 1919 to 1921, restricted to traditional policing functions. The political "G" Division did not come off so lightly and selected "G men" were first given warnings by the Irish Republican Army in April 1919. Five members of "G" Division were subsequently killed by the IRA, the first in July 1919. Several DMP officers actively assisted the IRA, most notably Edward Broy, who passed valuable intelligence to Michael Collins throughout the conflict.

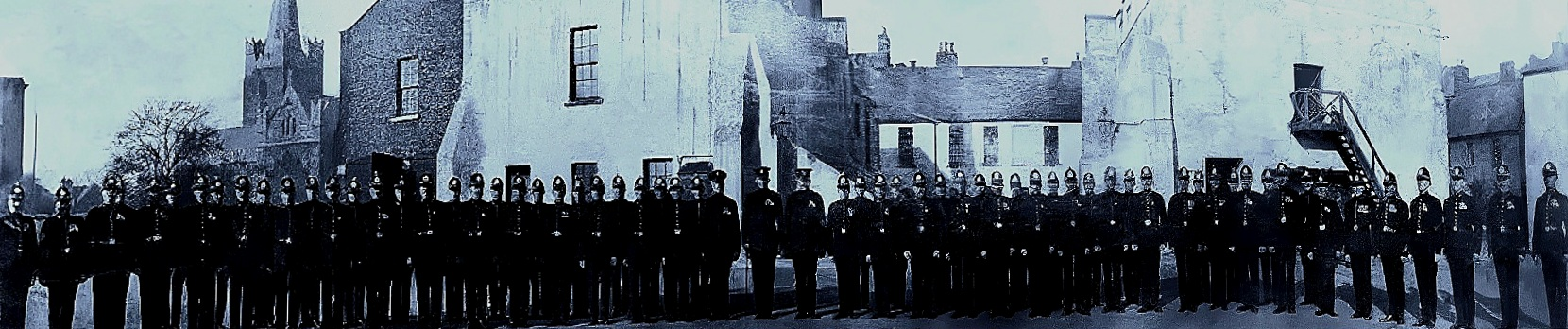
The Dublin Metropolitan Police at St. Sepulchre's Palace (1922)

In the 1996 film Michael Collins, Broy is discovered and subsequently tortured and killed by the British. In reality, he was not caught and went on to become the Commissioner of the Garda Síochána in the 1930s. His fate in the film is based on that of Dick McKee, who, with Peadar Clancy and the civilian Conor Clune, was murdered after torture in Dublin Castle on "Bloody Sunday", 21 November 1920.

After the creation of the Irish Free State, the DMP became known as "Políní Átha Cliath" (Police of Dublin) from 1922 to 1925, after which the force ceased to exist as a separate entity, being absorbed into the Garda Síochána (Guardians of the Peace). Its last Commissioner was W.R.E. Murphy. "Dublin Metropolitan" is today a geographic region of the Garda Síochána's command structure.

== Ranks ==
Ranks
Circa 1893–1901	Circa 1918–1924
Chief Commissioner	—
Commissioner	Commissioner
Chief Superintendent	Divisional Commissioner
Superintendent	Assistant Divisional Commissioner
Inspector	Chief Superintendent
Sub-Inspector	Superintendent
Station Sergeant	Inspector
Staff Sergeant	Station Sergeant
Sergeant	Staff Sergeant
Constable	Sergeant
Supernumerary Constable	Constable
—	Supernumerary Constable
