= David Neligan =

Irish nationalist and army officer (1899–1983)

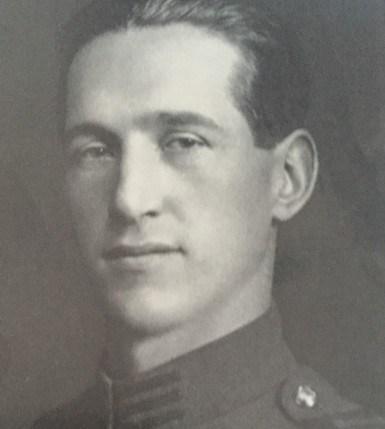
Neligan in 1923

David Neligan (14 October 1899 – 6 October 1983), sometimes known as "The Spy in the Castle", was an Irish nationalist who fought in the Irish War of Independence (1919–21) and Irish Civil War (1922–23). During the latter conflict he was involved in the murder of a number of IRA prisoners. Neligan subsequently became director of intelligence for the Irish Army.

== Early life ==
David Neligan was born 14 October 1899 at Templeglantine, Limerick where his parents, David and Elizabeth Neligan (née Mullan), were primary school teachers. He was an accomplished hurler with his local club, Templeglantine GAA. In 1917 Neligan joined the Irish Volunteers.

== Dublin Metropolitan Police & MI5 ==
Against his father's wishes, Neligan also joined the Dublin Metropolitan Police (DMP) in 1917. Picking up travel documentation from the local Royal Irish Constabulary barracks, he declined a suggestion that he enlist in this armed rural force. After service as a uniformed constable with the DMP, Neligan became a detective and was transferred to the counterintelligence and anti-political-subversion unit, the G Division, in 1919. In May 1920 Neligan's elder brother Maurice (1895–1920), an Irish Republican Army (IRA) member and friend of Michael Collins, persuaded him to resign from the DMP.

Neligan received word that Collins wished to meet him in Dublin. He persuaded Neligan to rejoin the DMP as a mole for the intelligence wing of the IRA. Along with detectives Eamon Broy and James McNamara, Neligan acted as an agent for Collins and passed on vital information. This included documents about the relative importance of police and military personnel and he also warned insurgents of upcoming raids and ambushes. One author claims that Neligan may have been a double agent working for the British.

In 1921 Collins ordered Neligan to let himself be recruited into MI5, from which he picked up passwords and the identity of their agents. This intelligence was passed to Collins. After Broy and McNamara were dismissed in 1921, Neligan became Collins' most important mole inside Dublin Castle.

== Irish Civil War ==
On the outbreak of the Civil War in June 1922, Neligan joined the Irish Army in Islandbridge Barracks with the rank of commandant and was attached to the Dublin Guard. He took part in the seaborne assault on Fenit and spent the remainder of the war serving as a military intelligence officer operating between Ballymullen Barracks, Tralee and Killarney. Alongside brigadier Paddy Daly, he was involved in atrocities. These included the Ballyseedy massacre (murder of anti-treaty prisoners by placing them on landmines), mock executions and torture of prisoners using crowbars and Neligan has been referred to as the "Butcher of Kerry". One of the IRA prisoners he is believed to have shot dead was 17-year-old Bartholomew Murphy of Castleisland, at whose inquest Daly lied by stating that the death was the result of an ambush on national troops by the IRA. In 1923 Neligan was posted to Dublin, where he was promoted to Colonel and succeeded Diarmuid O'Hegarty as the Irish Army's Director of Intelligence.

== Later life ==
In 1924 Neligan handed over his post to colonel Michael Joe Costello and took command of the DMP (which still continued as a force separate from the newly established Garda Síochána) with the rank of chief superintendent. The next year he transferred to the Garda when the two police forces were amalgamated and was instrumental in the foundation of Garda Special Branch. When Éamon de Valera became head of government in 1932, his republican followers demanded Neligan's dismissal. Instead, Neligan was transferred to an equivalent post in the Irish Civil Service. Neligan drew pensions from the DMP, the British MI5, the Garda Síochána and the Irish Civil Service. He also received an 'Old IRA' pension through the Department of Defence.

In June 1935 Neligan married fellow civil servant Sheila Maeve Rogan. He died on 6 October 1983.

== Sources ==
- The Spy in the Castle by David Neligan.
- Who's Who in the Irish War of Independence 1916–1921. Padraic O'Farrell, Mercier Press 1980.
