= Imperial Hotel, Dublin =

Former hotel in Dublin, Ireland

Imperial Hotel
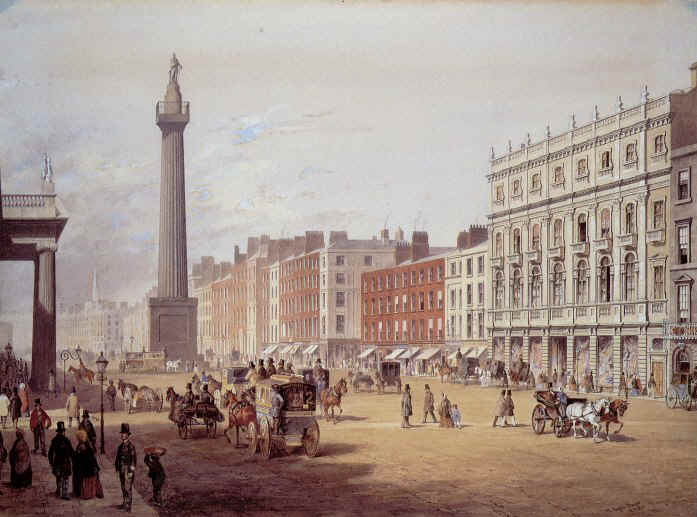
- 1853 view of Sackville Street by Michael Angelo Hayes
- Interactive map of the Imperial Hotel area

General information
- Status: Destroyed
- Type: Mixed hotel and business
- Location: Sackville Street, Dublin, Ireland
- Coordinates: 53.34912°N 6.25956°W
- Opened: May 1837
- Renovated: 1853; 1902
- Destroyed: April 27, 1916
- Client: Clerys Department Store
- Owner: Mcswiney, Delany and Co.

Renovating team
- Architects: William Francis Caldbeck (1853); George Coppinger Ashlin (1902)
- Main contractor: Fagan & Son

The Imperial Hotel was a hotel in Dublin's principal thoroughfare, Sackville Street, until it was destroyed during the Easter Rising of 1916. The building comprised Clerys department store on the lower floors and the Imperial Hotel on upper floors situated opposite the General Post Office and Nelson's Pillar.

== History ==
1850 street elevation of 21—22 Sackville Street (derivative work)

The hotel was located in Dublin's principal thoroughfare, Lower Sackville Street, described by William Thackeray as an "exceedingly broad and handsome" street. Dublin Corporation voted to rename the street as O'Connell Street on 4 May 1924.

Writing in 1844, and by way of tourist advice the German, Herr J. Venedy, wrote of the hotel:

I found that their arrangements were in the English manner, and the attendants, for the most part, English also. I advise every one who considers as indispensable as good bed, a well served table, and prefect English cleanliness, to betake himself to this hotel. Any one, on the other hand, who pays a visit to Ireland for the purpose of becoming acquainted with the Irish, I recommend to seek entertainment elsewhere.translated from German

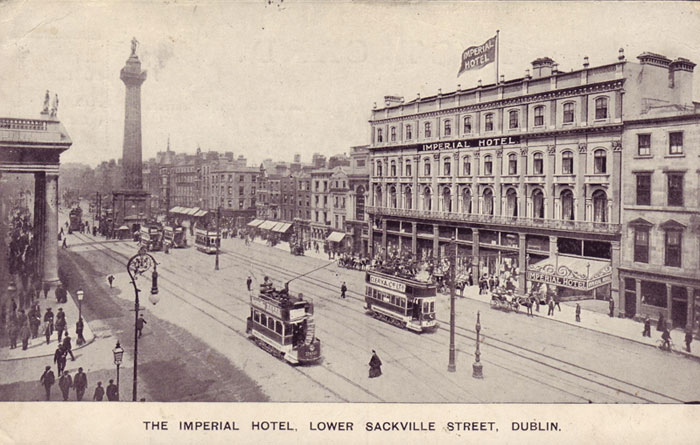
Picture postcard of Sackville Street with Imperial Hotel after expansion to eleven bays wide with the name inscribed between the floors, on the entrance awning and on the flag

Pictorial evidence from 1850 shows a four window wide building at 21–22 Lower Sackville Street opposite the General Post Office. The hotel name certainly was in use from at least 1843. In 1853, it was rebuilt by William Francis Caldbeck, an amateur architect, into an eight window wide building that also housed Clerys department store in the building's lower floors with the Imperial Hotel on the three upper floors whose street number was then 21–27. The ground floor department store had very tall large plate glass windows. In the Alexander Thom's 1863 almanac, James H Coleman is the manager of the hotel.

In Charles Bianconi's biography, written by his daughter Mary Anne, wife of Morgan John O'Connell, Bianconi is described as frequenting the Imperial Hotel in the 1860s. He reputedly did so because of its convenient location, including its closeness to the departure points of many of his own coaches, called bians, and its proximity to the General Post Office opposite. Even when he was wheel-chaired about it was a favorable place where he would meet his friends, and he is said to have done twice as much business in a day as anyone else would complete in two. He used to say that "he could ask them to come when he liked, and he could send them away when he likes."

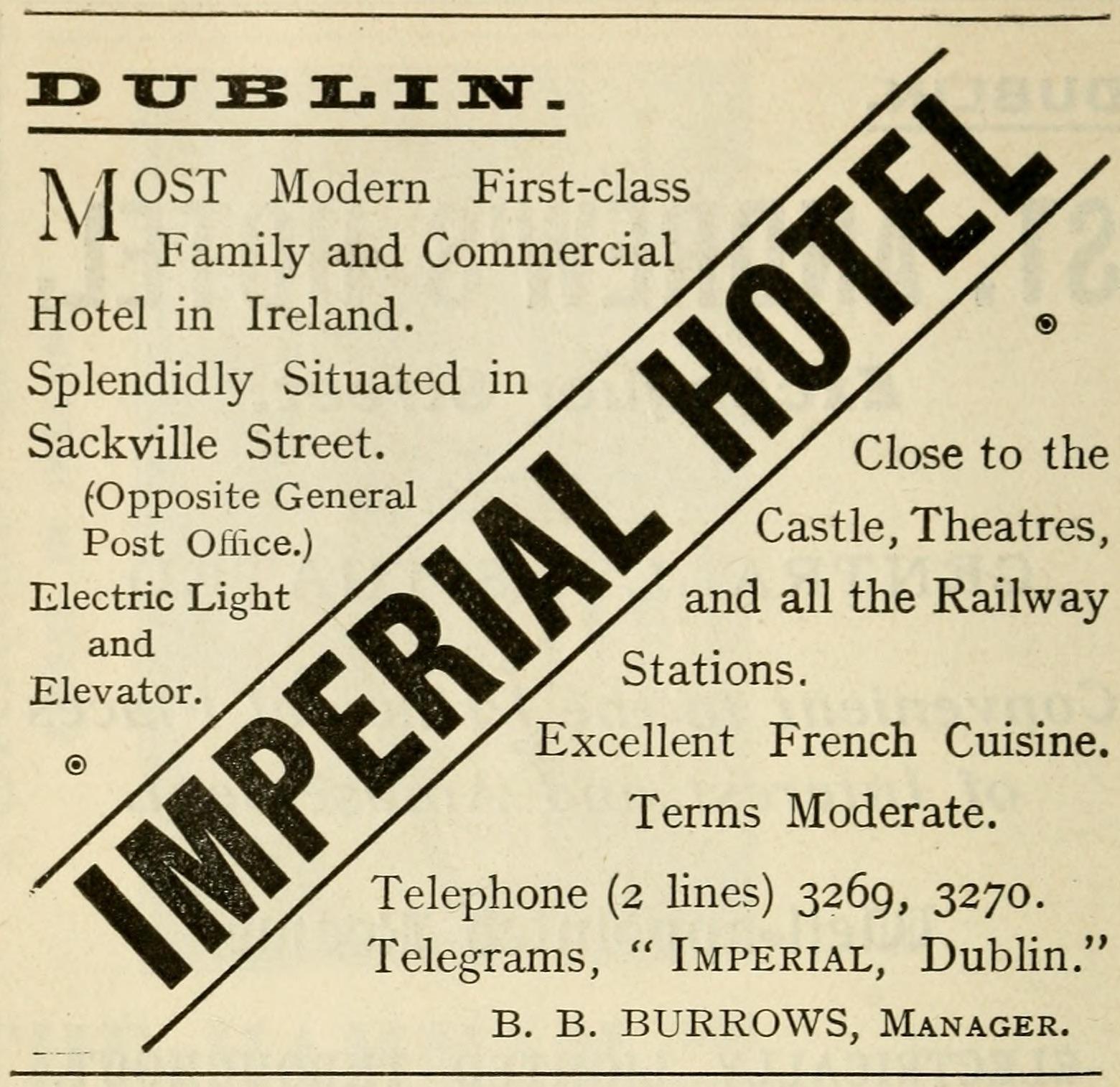
1914 advertising for the hotel

In 1875 William Martin Murphy, having moved his business headquarters from Bantry to Cork and thence to Dublin, bought the hotel and department store in addition to his other business interests.

To enlarge the premises to an eleven window wide facade, around 1902 three additional bays were added by Dublin architect George Coppinger Ashlin. Ashlin also added the complex wrought iron canopy over main entrance featuring the hotel's name interwoven, made by Fagan & Son. The building remained in this format until its destruction in 1916.

== Mail ==
In the 1840s and 1850s the hotel had its own post paid handstamp to indicate to the post office the mail had been pre-paid which at that time was not the norm. Most mail was sent unpaid.

Several Dublin hotels were the departure points for transport of mail and people to destinations around the island of Ireland. In 1849 the Imperial Hotel was noted as such a location for the following mail coaches: Belfast day mail and Belfast night mail, Derry mail, Cork day mail and Cork night mail, Kilkenny, Waterford and Wexford Mails. In addition a number of coaches, caravans and cars also departed from outside the hotel. The hotel contained the "Northern and Southern Mail and Day Coach Office." By 1852 the Enniskillen mail coach also departed here.

== 1913 Lockout ==
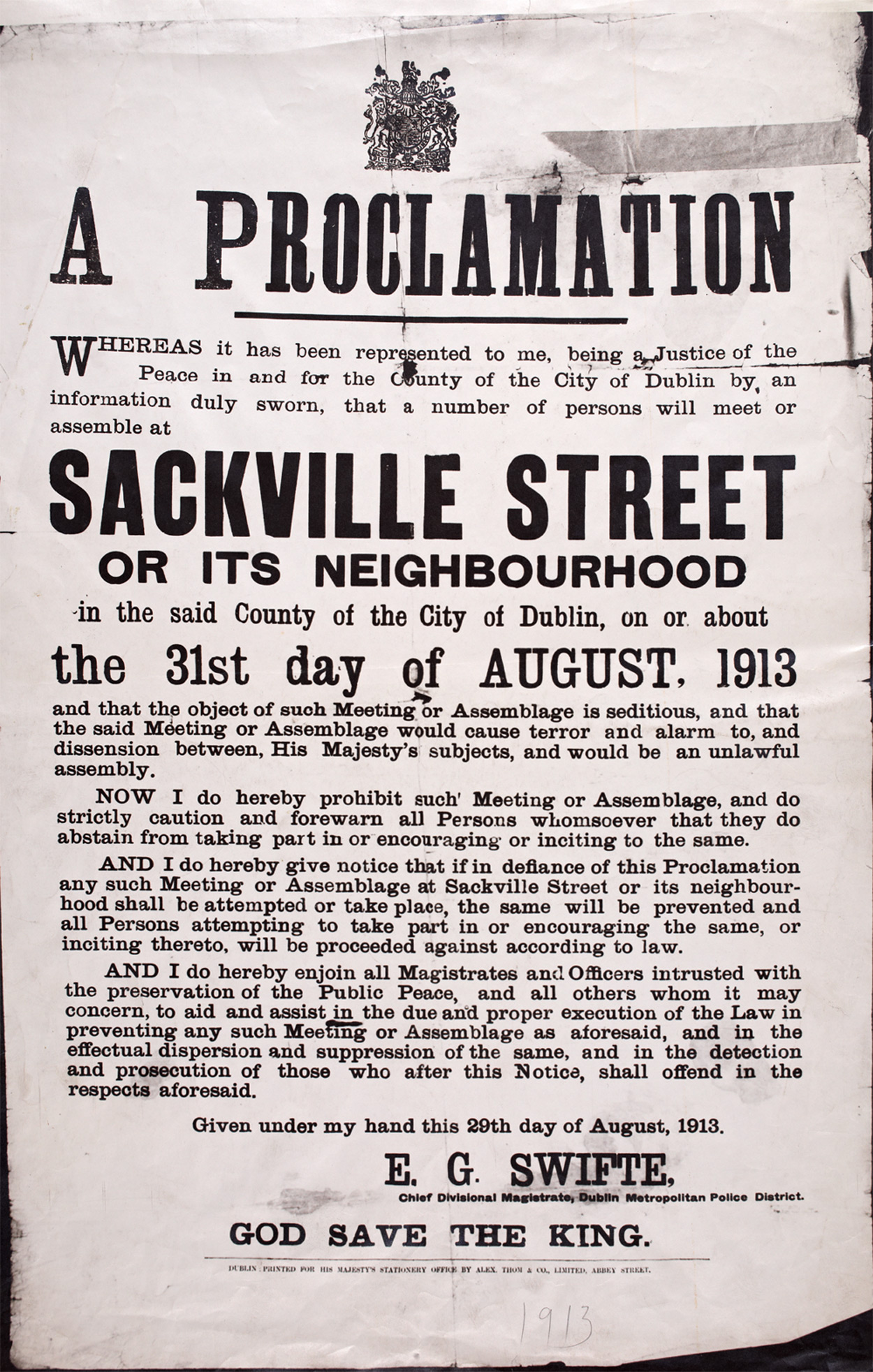
1913 meeting prohibition - Larkin

During the 1913 Dublin lock-out, Murphy, the owner of the Imperial Hotel and Clerys department store and several other businesses, such as the Dublin United Tramway Company, was no lover of trade unions. He had dismissed hundred of workers and was determined not to allow the ITGWU, Irish Transport and General Workers' Union, founded by James Larkin in 1909 to unionise his workforce.

On 29 August Larkin had spoken to an audience of about 10,000 in Beresford Place burning the proclamation, issued by magistrate Swifte, banning a meeting intended for 31 August, and making remarks against the King and the magistrate, where he also promised his supporters he would speak in Sockville Street (not yet renamed O'Connell Street) on the appointed day. Despite being banned from public speaking, Larkin snuck into the Murphy's hotel in disguise. A frail old gentleman accompanied by his niece arrived, having pre-booked rooms the previous day and some minutes later the man appeared and made his way to the window of the smoke-room, having lingered there a few minutes, where he started speaking. Handel Booth a Liberal Party MP, reported Larkin's words: Comrades and friends, the police have forbidden a meeting to take place in O’Connell Street to-day, but I am here to speak and will remain till I am arrested.

Having started to speak from the balcony of one of the hotel room windows, he was arrested and mayhem broke out in the street below once the police force of about 300 strong charged and violently attacked the crowd. Many spectators fled though many had been assaulted resulting in bleeding heads and being kicked while on the ground. Twenty Baton wielding policemen escorted Larkin, who had the remains of his makeup in evidence, from the hotel to a local police station.

== Easter Rising ==
During the 1916 Easter Rising, the damage to many buildings in Sackville Street was severe. The Imperial Hotel and the General Post Office opposite, were very badly damaged during the fighting and only the hotel front facade remained though barely intact.

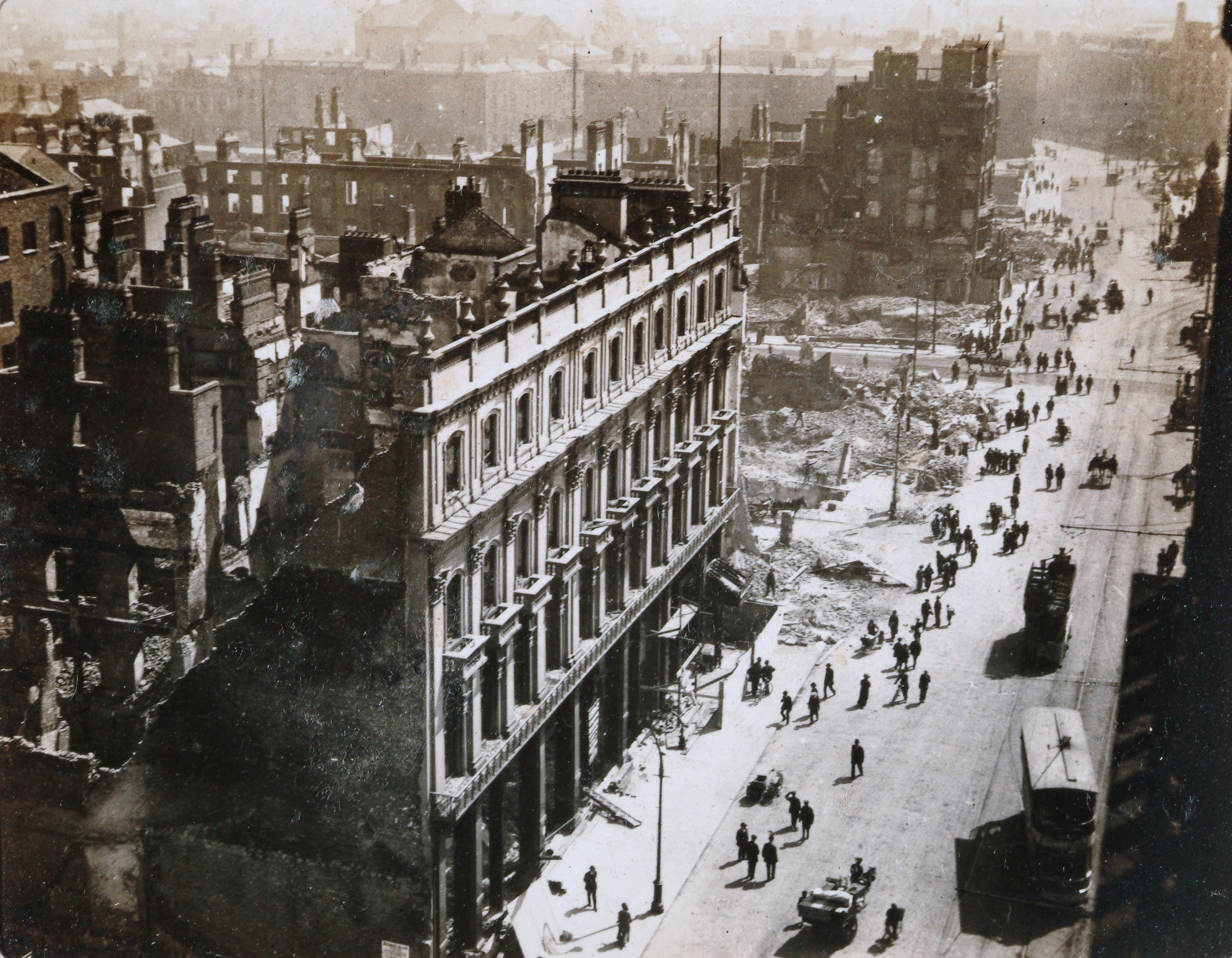
Photo of the burnt-out building with only the facade left standing, photographed from the top of Nelson's Pillar

Garrisons of insurgents occupied the hotel and both the General Post Office and Metropole Hotel on the opposite side of the street. On Easter Monday evening, 24 April, food and bedding were brought to the GPO from the Imperial Hotel and Clerys. The Irish Citizen Army occupied the hotel, and hoisted the Starry Plough flag over the building during the Rising. It was still flying when the building had been consumed by fire. The flag was retrieved, at great risk, by second Lieutenant T.A. Williams of the 9th Reserve Cavalry, Kildare Barracks. The empty flagpole is seen in photographs taken on 16 May 1916. Joe Sweeney, an Irish Volunteer in the GPO stated that Friday dawned on a desolate site opposite us. All that remained of Clery's and the Imperial Hotel was the front wall of the building on the top of which to Connolly's great delight the flag of the Citizen Army still floated proudly. The restored flag is now on display at the National Museum, Collins Barracks, in Dublin.

On Thursday evening 27 April 1916, when the Hoyt's shop, beside the hotel and Clerys, was engulfed by fire, it spread to the hotel because there were quantities of turpentine and other inflammable products stored in the shop. The Metropole garrison attempted to warn those in the Imperial hotel, by semaphore, of the imminent danger but their warnings appear not to have been heeded because their eventual evacuation was quite hasty, especially when the large plate glass windows melted into the street.

== Legacy ==
Clerys was awarded damages of £77,292 for the building's reconstruction that took place in 1922 but no hotel accommodation was included in the new design by architect Robert Atkinson.

As of 2021 the building is being redeveloped into an office, hotel and retail development which will form part of a rebranded 'Clerys Quarter'. The 213 bedroom hotel element of the scheme is to be named 'The Clery' and most rooms are to be located in the rear building facing onto Earl Place. The hotel will be operated by Press Up Entertainment.
