= Dublin Reconstruction (Emergency Provisions) Act 1916 =

Act of the Parliament of the United Kingdom

Dublin Reconstruction (Emergency Provisions) Act 1916 (Note: Section 12.)
- Act of Parliament
- Parliament of the United Kingdom
- Long title: An Act to amend the law as to the erection of buildings and the making and improvement of streets in connection with the reconstruction of areas, streets, and buildings recently damaged or destroyed in Dublin, and for other purposes incidental thereto.
- Citation: 6 & 7 Geo. 5. c. 66
- Territorial extent: United Kingdom

Dates
- Royal assent: 22 December 1916
- Commencement: 22 December 1916 (Note: The Acts of Parliament (Commencement) Act 1793.)
Other legislation
Relates to	Dublin Reconstruction (Emergency Provisions) Act 1924 (Irish Free State)

Status: Amended

Text of statute as originally enacted

The Dublin Reconstruction (Emergency Provisions) Act 1916 (6 & 7 Geo. 5. c. 66) is an act of the Parliament of the United Kingdom, given royal assent on 22 December 1916. The act provided for the reconstruction of areas of Dublin which had been destroyed in the Easter Rising of April 1916, under the supervision of the Dublin city architect.

== Background ==
Significant areas of central Dublin had been destroyed or damaged during the rebellion, particularly around Sackville Street, and included the loss of notable buildings such as the Hotel Metropole, Dublin, Clerys, the General Post Office, Dublin and the Academy House of the Royal Hibernian Academy. Under pressure from Dubliners such as William Martin Murphy, the Lord Lieutenant of Ireland established the Property Losses (Ireland) Committee on 15 June 1916 to assess claims for compensation, including applications relating to the nearly 200 damaged or destroyed buildings.

The following month, a delegation of Dubliners led by mayor James Gallagher met the British prime minister, H. H. Asquith, in London. The group requested financial assistance to the Dublin Corporation for reconstruction work and for workable town planning regulations to ensure that buildings were restored, at a minimum, in a manner not worse than before and ideally, as Gallagher put it to the Home Secretary, "in consonance with a well devised town planning and street widening scheme". A similar view was expressed by the Royal Institute of the Architects of Ireland and by Rudolf Maximilian Butler.

As the Housing, Town Planning, &c. Act 1909 did not apply to Ireland, the corporation sought legislative powers to have some measure of control over the character of the buildings to be erected and to improve streets. The Dublin Castle administration, however, objected to the idea of British taxpayers funding the rebuilding of a beautified Sackville Street, while the Irish Property Owners' Association resisted attempts to control or increase the expense of rebuilding plans. An HM Treasury minute stated that the "Dublin Corporation ought not to be encouraged to embark upon grandiose schemes of beautification, which are of the nature of luxuries".

== The act ==
As a result of the petition and after negotiation with affected parties, the Dublin Reconstruction (Emergency Provisions) Act 1916 passed into law in December 1916. The act compelled those proposing to rebuild to submit to the corporation elevations of new buildings, in addition to the already required plans and sections. It gave the Dublin city architect, Horace T. O'Rourke, the power to approve or reject plans to rebuild the city that were not consistent with the historic appearance of the main thoroughfares in the city. However, no uniform design scheme proved possible for the Sackville Street area. The act also gave legislative authority for a £700,000 loan to the Dublin Corporation and for the compensation grants recommended by the Property Losses (Ireland) Committee. Within strict limits, and only with the approval of the Local Government Board, the corporation was empowered to loan money to enable rebuilding. It could also compulsorily purchase sites where owners failed to rebuild.

Following further damage to Dublin during the Irish Civil War, the Oireachtas of the Irish Free State passed the Dublin Reconstruction (Emergency Provisions) Act 1924. This made similar amendments to the law relating to reconstruction of buildings damaged in 1922. Although the Town and Regional Planning Act 1934 set town planning on a firm legislative foundation, the formal planning of the development of Dublin did not begin until the 1960s.
