= Cathedral Street =

Cathedral Street may refer to:

== Places ==
=== Finland ===
- Tuomiokirkonkatu, "Cathedral Street" in Tampere

=== Ireland ===
- Cathedral Street, Dublin

=== United Kingdom ===
- Cathedral Street, Dunkeld
- Cathedral Street, Manchester

=== United States ===
- Cathedral Street (Baltimore)
