= RTÉ Radio Centre =

Radio production centre for Irish broadcaster Raidió Teilifís Éireann

Coordinates: 53.316525°N 6.226733°W

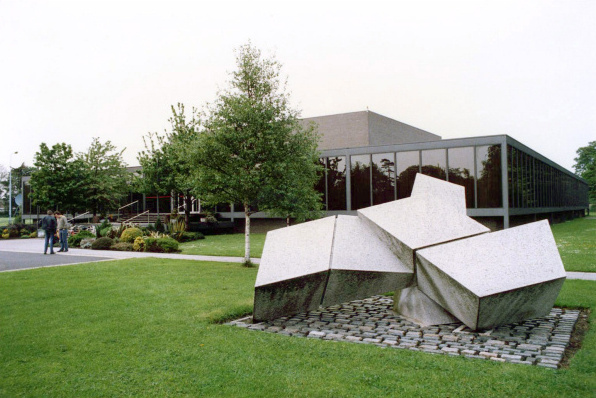
- The Radio Centre on the RTÉ campus.

General information
- Type: Radio Studios
- Location: RTÉ Campus, Donnybrook, Dublin, Ireland
- Current tenants: RTÉ Radio
- Construction started: June 1969
- Completed: April 1971
- Client: RTÉ

Design and construction
- Architect: Ronnie Tallon
- Architecture firm: Scott Tallon Walker
- Main contractor: O'Connor & Bailey Ltd.
- Awards: Royal Institute of the Architects of Ireland Gold Medal

The RTÉ Radio Centre is the main production and control centre for the national radio networks of the Irish public service broadcaster Raidió Teilifís Éireann. The building is located on the RTÉ campus at Donnybrook in Dublin. Construction of the building commenced in June 1969 and was completed in April 1971. Along with a number of other buildings on the campus, it is included in Dublin City Council's Record of Protected Structures (Ref. No. 8888)

== History ==
Since 1928 Irish radio, (Radio Éireann), had been housed in the GPO on O'Connell Street, in the centre of Dublin, in cramped and unsuitable accommodation. With the imminent arrival of television, a site was acquired in 1960 for the building of a television production centre in south Dublin (RTÉ Television Centre). From the beginning it was the intention that the radio service should also join television on a broadcasting campus at Donnybrook. However it was not until the late 1960s that the detailed planning and construction began that would accommodate on-site a new purpose-built centre for radio production. Once construction of the building had finished in April 1971 the phased move from the GPO began, but it was not until September 1973 that the first live broadcast was made from the new Radio Centre. By May 1974 all broadcasting from the GPO had ceased, except for presentation announcements which continued to be made from the old Henry Street studios until 8 November 1976.

== Building ==
The building is on two floors, above ground are the various programme offices, and below ground covering a greater area are the studios, thirteen in all. The studios have been built underground for greater soundproofing. The largest, Studio 1, is 340sq metres and at 10m high it reaches to the top of building. This studio was designed for live orchestral performances and other large productions, and incorporates an elevated audience seating area. The other twelve studios are grouped around studio 1 and a small courtyard which extends up through the building giving daylight to the below ground corridors and control rooms. The courtyard contains a bust of Seán Ó Riada a former assistant director of Radio Éireann. As well as the studios and their respective control rooms the subterranean floor of the building contains a Master Control Room, switching racks, computer servers, and tape archives.

From this building emanates most of RTÉ's radio output on two national channels RTÉ Radio 1, and RTÉ 2fm, as well as a number of digital radio channels available online. RTÉ's two other national radio channels are broadcast from outside Dublin. Classical music station RTÉ Lyric FM is based in Limerick city, and Irish language station RTÉ Raidió na Gaeltachta is based in Casla, County Galway.

All news bulletins on RTÉ Radio come from studios in the RTÉ Television Centre where the main newsroom is situated, and in 2022 two new “visual radio” studios were opened, one in the television centre and another in the adjoining Stage 7 building. The studios, which are primarily intended for radio news output, are equipped with small unmanned cameras that allow the various radio programmes to be seen on the RTÉ News channel and their online services.

== Future development ==
In 2009 RTÉ announced its long-term plans for the redevelopment of the entire Donnybrook site, including the Television Centre and the Radio Centre. The project envisages the gradual replacement over a ten to fifteen-year period of most of the current 1960s and 1970s buildings on the Donnybrook site with a purpose-built modern building complex designed for the digital and high-definition age.
