= John J. Farrell (Irish politician) =

Irish politician (c.1871–1854)

Lord Mayor of Dublin
- In office 1911–1912
- Preceded by: Michael Doyle
- Succeeded by: Lorcan Sherlock

Personal details
- Born: c. 1871 County Wicklow, Ireland
- Died: 31 May 1954 (aged 82–83) Dublin, Ireland
- Party: Irish Parliamentary Party
- Spouse: Mary Farrell (m. 1898; died 1914)
- Children: 6

John Joseph Farrell (c. 1871 – 31 May 1954) was an Irish businessman and politician. He was a member of Dublin Corporation, and served as Lord Mayor of Dublin from 1911 to 1912. He as a member of the Irish Parliamentary Party.

Farrell is recorded in the 1911 census of Ireland, when he was Lord Mayor of Dublin and living in the Mansion House. He married Mary Josephine in 1898; and they had six children.

He had business interests in several cinemas in Dublin, and was the managing director of the Irish Kinematograph Company. In 1917, he claimed £77 10s for damage caused by gunfire during the 1916 Easter Rising to a building owned by the Irish Kinematograph Company in O'Connell Street. The Property Losses Committee recommended a payment of £20.

On 10 February 1920, his home in Drumcondra was raided by British forces, under the DORA act.

Civic offices
Preceded by Michael Doyle	Lord Mayor of Dublin; 1911–1912	Succeeded by Lorcan Sherlock
