= Property Losses (Ireland) Committee =

State compensation body after the Easter Rising in Ireland

The Property Losses (Ireland) Committee was a committee established by the Dublin Castle administration in Ireland in 1916 to assess claims for damages to buildings and property as a result of destruction caused by the Easter Rising. Although principally concerned with claims from Dublin residents and businesses, the committee assessed claims associated with the insurrection from across Ireland. It considered damages resulting from the actions of British forces, Irish rebels and looters, with over 7,000 claims being investigated. The committee's final report was submitted to the British government on 7 April 1917, after which compensation grants were issued by HM Treasury on the committee's recommendation.

== Background ==
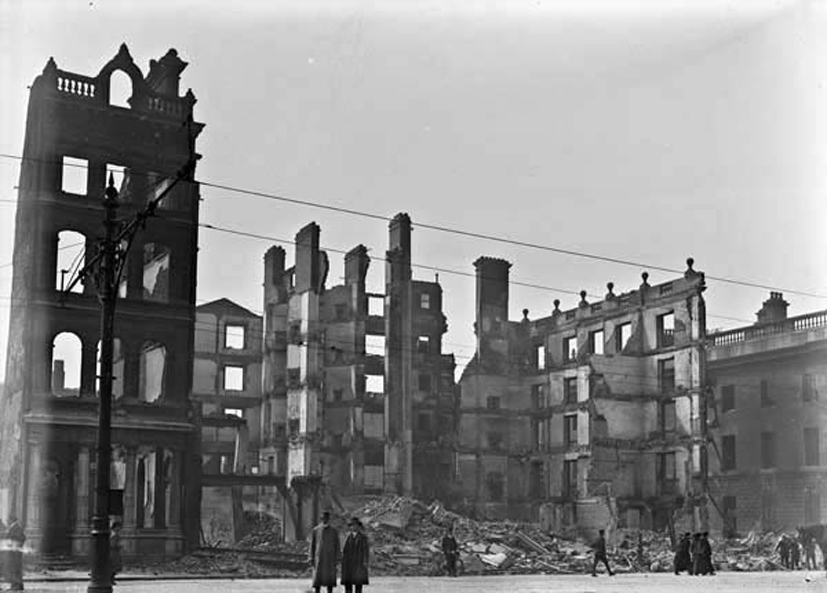
Ruins of the Metropole Hotel on Sackville Street, Dublin. A claim for £2,280 was submitted for the reconstruction of the building, with dozens of other claims for lost contents

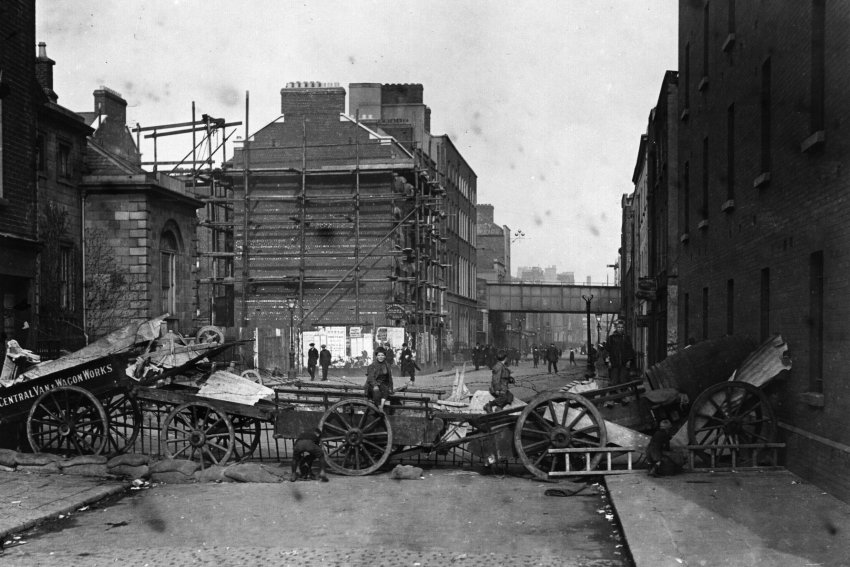
A street barricade erected by the rebels in Dublin during the Rising. Many insurance claims were submitted which related to possessions lost in the construction of barricades

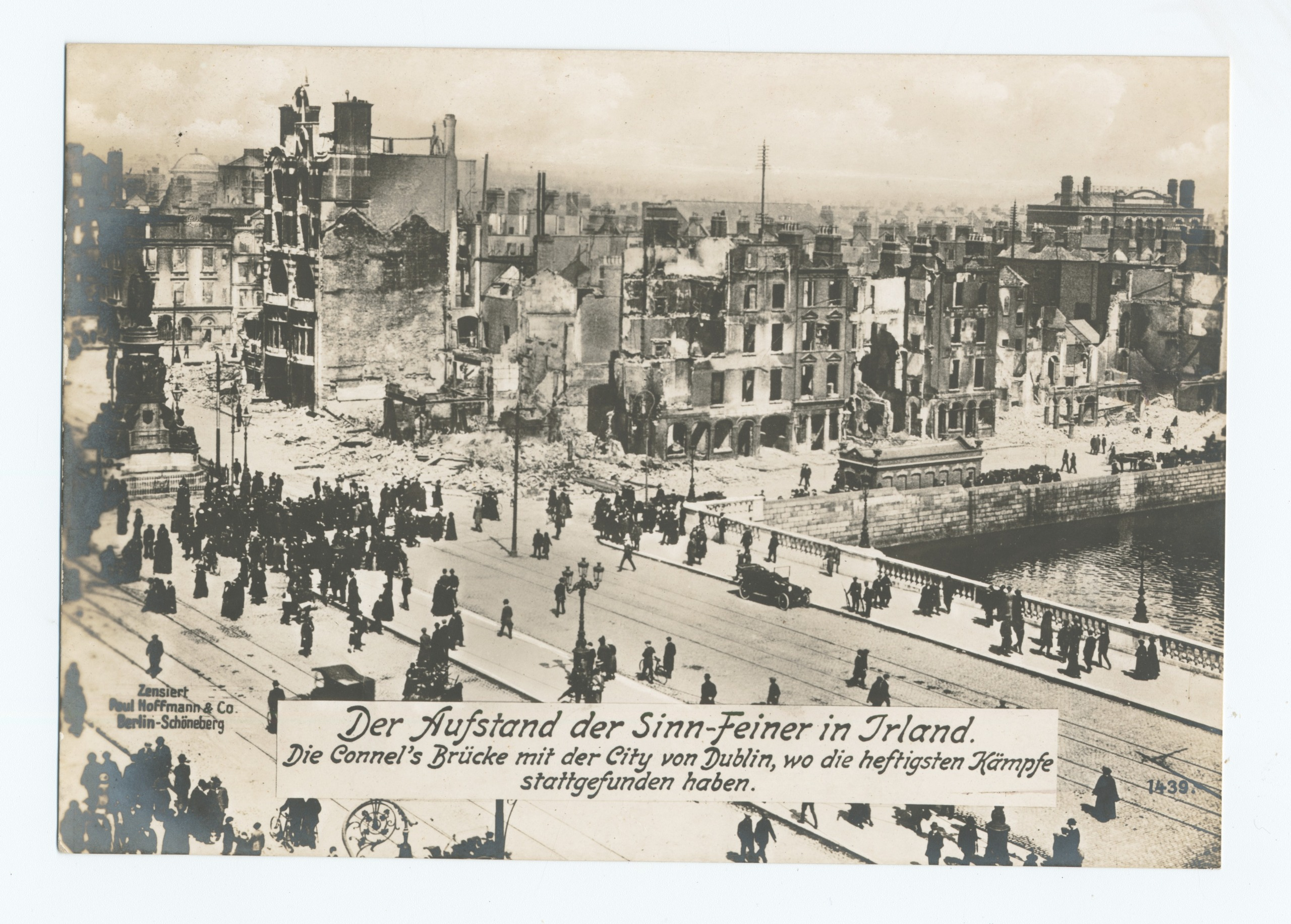
View of O'Connell Bridge, 1916, on a German postcard. The caption reads: Rising of the Sinn Feiners in Ireland. O'Connell bridge with Dublin city, where the fiercest clashes took place.

The Easter Rising of April 1916 had resulted in significant destruction and damage to large areas of central Dublin. Most of the destruction of buildings had been caused by the use of artillery by British forces, as well as shelling from the British patrol vessel HMY Helga. Damage and loss was also caused by firefights, the occupation of buildings by British soldiers and Irish rebels, and widespread looting. The devastation was particularly severe along Sackville Street and Henry Street, with many damaged and looted buildings on Abbey Street, Prince's Street, North Earl Street, Marlborough Street, and Eden Quay.

The Academy House of the Royal Hibernian Academy had been destroyed by fire, resulting in the loss of over five hundred works of art and the Academy’s holdings of fine art prints, books, and other materials.

Many businesses in central Dublin, particularly between Parnell Street and the River Liffey, had also been affected. The Metropole Hotel was ruined. In addition, many Dublin citizens lost property and possessions, ranging from bicycles commandeered for transport to furniture used for the construction of street barricades.

In early May 1916 in the immediate aftermath of the Rising, businessman William Martin Murphy established the Dublin Fire and Property Losses Association alongside business interests and property owners.

The association met in Mansion House, Dublin on 8 May 1916 with the aim of exerting pressure on the Irish Parliamentary Party and the British government to provide compensation to those who had lost their business or property and to provide for the associated costs of rebuilding. A deputation from the association met Sir Robert Chalmers on 10 and 11 May. On 10 May the British prime minister H. H. Asquith acknowledged to the House of Commons that the British treasury would need to pay for the damage inflicted by British forces, but this was quickly determined to be on an ex gratia basis and not in recognition of any legal right to compensation.

Politically, the Lord Lieutenant of Ireland, Lord Wimborne noted the need for compensation as a means of conciliating the many Dubliners affected by the Rising, an issue also communicated to the administration by Dublin's Lord Mayor, James Gallagher. On 9 May, a group of Dublin MPs including J. J. Clancy, P. J. Brady and Alfie Byrne wrote to Asquith stating that "the feeling in Dublin amongst all classes is that the compensation should come out of Imperial funds". Asquith visited Ireland between 12 and 18 May to ascertain the extent of damage and the mood of the Irish people; his first action on arrival was to be driven along the ruined Sackville Street. After several weeks of negotiations between interested parties, on 9 June a pivotal meeting took place at Dublin Castle between the association, Irish MPs (led by John Redmond) and the Home Secretary Herbert Samuel.

Following this the British government, through the Dublin Castle administration, decided to establish a committee to address the growing number of claims and in order "not to embitter, but to allay, the feeling" among the Irish.

== The committee's work ==
On 15 June 1916, Lord Wimborne issued a warrant establishing the Property Losses (Ireland) Committee with direction to act under his authority. The committee comprised three members appointed by the Lord Lieutenant: Sir William Goulding, a Dublin businessman and unionist who served as chairman; William E Osborn of Messrs Selfe and Company of London; and Samuel Pipkin, general manager of the Atlas Assurance Company Limited of London. The secretary of the committee was James J Healy of the Commissioners of Public Works in Ireland. The group had its first meeting on 21 June 1916 at 51 St Stephen's Green East. The original name of the committee – the Destroyed Property Committee – was altered to be less contentious.

The committee was charged with three responsibilities. First, to ascertain the sums covered for ordinary fire risks by insurance policies in force at the time of the destruction. Secondly, to advise what part of such sums would have been paid by insurance companies if the destruction had been caused by accidental fire. Thirdly, to recommend how the various claims of uninsured persons could fairly be dealt with and, in a significant concession to the Dublin Fire and Loss Association, to what extent exceptional treatment should be allowed for insured persons in view of the unique circumstances of Easter Week.

The committee had initially stated that it would only entertain claims from uninsured or partially insured businesses or individuals. Some insurance companies, however, refused to pay for damage sustained as a result of "acts of war". Following pressure from the Association the rule was relaxed and the committee's remit widened significantly. Despite lobbying, the committee refused to consider claims for consequential loss, including claims for loss of customers and the loss of fresh produce that had rotted.

Claims were divided into two categories: damage to buildings and damage to contents. Individuals and businesses submitted their claim to the committee through a standardised form. Many forms contained annexes, such as police reports, correspondence and architectural plans in cases where entire buildings had been destroyed. The claims were subject to police inspection and claims from anyone associated with the rebel forces were not admitted. Three Irish firms of assessors were appointed to deal with claims in excess of £100: Walter Hume & Co., Dublin; William Montgomery & Son, Dublin; and, from July, R. N. Kennedy, Belfast. By the autumn of 1916 ten assessors were employed.

The majority of the claims related to small items, such as jewellery left for repair in one of the jewellers in Sackville Street or personal items belonging to those employed in many of the businesses in the areas affected by the destruction. This included claims for items such as shoes and clothing.

Several claims relating to the Royal Hibernian Academy fire were submitted, including from artists Jack Butler Yeats, Madeline Green, and John Lavery. Artist Harry Clarke and poet Lennox Robinson made claims for products lost in the destruction of the building belonging to Maunsel and Company Limited. Many businesses made claims for lost stock, particularly as a result of the extensive looting which began within hours of the initiation of the insurrection. Beyond Dublin, there were substantial claims related to looting in County Wexford and County Galway.

The Final Report of the Property Losses (Ireland) Committee, 1916 was submitted to the British government on 7 April 1917, signed by the three members of the committee and its secretary. The report contained a detailed overview of the claims, the procedures followed by the committee and the practical outcomes in terms of the monies to be paid to claimants. The report also highlighted the justified nature of the majority of claims, emphasising the lack of firefighting immediately after the Rising and the failure of the police to prevent looting. Of the 7,001 claims submitted, 6,236 were admitted and contained in the final report's recommendation for compensation. The sum of the submitted claims amounted to £2,791,872 (equivalent to over £191.8 million in 2022), of which admitted claims made up £2,632,522. The committee recommended for payment of £1,844,390, or 70 per cent of the sum.

This was to be paid as ex gratia grants, which was supplemented by a £700,000 loan for reconstruction work to the Dublin Corporation. The largest awards were for the 210 cases in which property had to be completely rebuilt. The largest of these awards was for Clerys which was granted £77,292 for the destruction of its shop at 21-27 Sackville Street.

Many smaller claims were for little more than £2, such as £2 16s paid to Daniel Murphy Ltd for pork seized by looters at Kingsbridge Station. The 765 rejected applications totalled £159,350. George Noble Plunkett and his wife submitted four claims for the alleged theft by soldiers of their money, jewellery and personal effects, as well as damage to property. None were entertained. Twenty eight applications totalling £577 were withdrawn. On the instruction of Lord Wimborne, government losses were not considered, so the loss of the General Post Office, Dublin was not included in the report.

Funds for actual expenditure on rebuilding were released on a phased basis on the production of a certificate from the architect or builder, sometimes leading to delays in the issuing of compensation. Funding was made available from HM Treasury following the passing of the Dublin Reconstruction (Emergency Provisions) Act 1916 by the UK Parliament, which Dublin's mayor James Gallagher had helped to secure.

After submitting the report, the case files and associated administrative paperwork were stored in the Chief Secretary's Office, Dublin Castle. In 1986, the material was transferred to the National Archives of Ireland. The collection was cleaned and digitised by the archives in 2009.
