= James Gallagher (mayor) =

Irish politician (1860–1925)

Lord Mayor of Dublin
- In office 1915–1917
- Preceded by: Lorcan Sherlock
- Succeeded by: Laurence O'Neill

Personal details
- Born: 1860 County Leitrim, Ireland
- Died: 1925 (aged 64–65) Dublin, Ireland
- Party: Independent
- Spouse: Annie O'Brien

Sir James Michael Gallagher (1860–1925) was an Irish businessman who was Lord Mayor of Dublin for two terms.

== Biography ==
Gallagher was born in Kiltyclogher, County Leitrim, the son of Patrick Gallagher. By 1889 he had moved to Dublin and opened a business as a cigar importer; by 1905 the business had four shops in the city. On 15 January 1908 he was elected to the Dublin Corporation for Fitzwilliam ward for the United Irish League, and he continued to represent the ward until the corporation was suspended by the Irish Free State government in 1924. He was appointed a Justice of the Peace in 1913.

Gallagher was elected to serve two consecutive terms as Lord Mayor of Dublin as an independent between 1915 and 1917.

His tenure coincided with the Easter Rising and the resulting general instability in Dublin. He emphasised to the Dublin Castle administration the need for British government compensation for Dubliners as a result of the destruction of much of the city, commenting "They blew up the best portion of our city and... it is their duty to replace it". His lobbying, and that of the Dublin Fire and Property Losses Association, led to the establishment of the Property Losses (Ireland) Committee by the Lord Lieutenant in June 1916.

In July 1916, he travelled to London to petition the British government for assistance in rebuilding Dublin and for workable town planning regulations. This resulted in a £700,000 loan to the Dublin Corporation and in the Dublin Reconstruction (Emergency Provisions) Act 1916 passing into law in December 1916.

From London, Gallagher proceeded to Paris to visit the Exposition de la Cité Réconstitutée – an urban planning exhibition of plans for rebuilding areas in France and Belgium destroyed during the First World War. At the quarterly meeting of the Dublin Corporation in October 1916 Lord Mayor Gallagher made a lengthy statement defending the corporation's management of the city in reference to criticisms of the administration by The Irish Times. He was knighted at the end of his second term in 1917. He was the last knighted person to be Lord Mayor of Dublin.

Civic offices
Preceded by Lorcan Sherlock	Lord Mayor of Dublin; 1915–1917	Succeeded by Laurence O'Neill
