= Michael Doyle (Irish Parliamentary Party politician) =

Irish politician (c.1840s–1920)

Lord Mayor of Dublin
- In office 1910–1911
- Preceded by: William Coffey
- Succeeded by: John J. Farrell

Personal details
- Born: c. 1840s Dublin, Ireland
- Died: 1920
- Party: Irish Parliamentary Party

Michael Doyle (c. 1840s – 1920) was an Irish Parliamentary Party politician. He was a member of Dublin Corporation, and served as Lord Mayor of Dublin from 1910 to 1911.

He was High Sheriff of Dublin in 1909.

Civic offices
Preceded by William Coffey	Lord Mayor of Dublin; 1910–1911	Succeeded by John J. Farrell
