= Lorcan Sherlock =

Irish politician (1874–1945)

Lord Mayor of Dublin
- In office 1912–1915
- Preceded by: John J. Farrell
- Succeeded by: James Gallagher

Personal details
- Born: 5 June 1874 Dublin, Ireland
- Died: 26 December 1945 (aged 71) Dublin, Ireland
- Party: Irish Parliamentary Party
- Spouses: Elizabeth Doyle (m. 1897–1905); Catherine McEneaney (m. 1910)
- Children: 3

Lorcan George Sherlock (5 June 1874 – 26 December 1945) was an Irish businessman and politician who served as Lord Mayor of Dublin from 1912 to 1915. He was a member of the Irish Parliamentary Party.

Lorcan Sherlock was born as one of four sons and two daughters of Thomas Sherlock and his wife Theresa (née Donnelly), Thomas Sherlock was a journalist and member of Dublin City Council. Two of his Lorcan's brothers, Thomas and John, also later worked as journalists, like their father. The third, Gerald, became Dublin's first city manager.

He was educated at the O'Connell School on North Richmond Street, Dublin. In 1897, he married Elizabeth Doyle, and they had two children. After her death, he married Catherine McEneaney in 1910, with whom he had a daughter.

In 1905, he was elected to Dublin Corporation, representing his local district, the Mountjoy ward. In 1912, he was elected Lord Mayor of Dublin and served three successive terms.

He was outspoken on workers' rights and made statements in support of trade unionism. The 1913 Dublin lock-out defined Sherlock's second term in the Mansion House. On 31 August a city-centre meeting called by Jim Larkin to address the workers was savagely baton-charged by the police, resulting in hundreds of injuries and the deaths of two civilians. In response, Sherlock called for a public enquiry into the behaviour of the police.

He was the last Irish Parliamentary Party politician to serve as Lord Mayor. After the formation of the Irish Free State, Sherlock retired from politics, and instead performed the role of chief returning officer for the city of Dublin in the 1924, 1927, 1933 and 1937 general elections.

In his youth, Sherlock was a keen cricketer. In later years he turned to golf. The Lorcan Sherlock Cup, which has been awarded since 1934, is named after him. He died on 26 December 1945 at his residence in Sydney Parade, Dublin.

Civic offices
Preceded by John J. Farrell	Lord Mayor of Dublin; 1912–1915	Succeeded by James Gallagher
