= Hotel Metropole, Dublin =

Former Hotel in Dublin, Ireland

Hotel Metropole
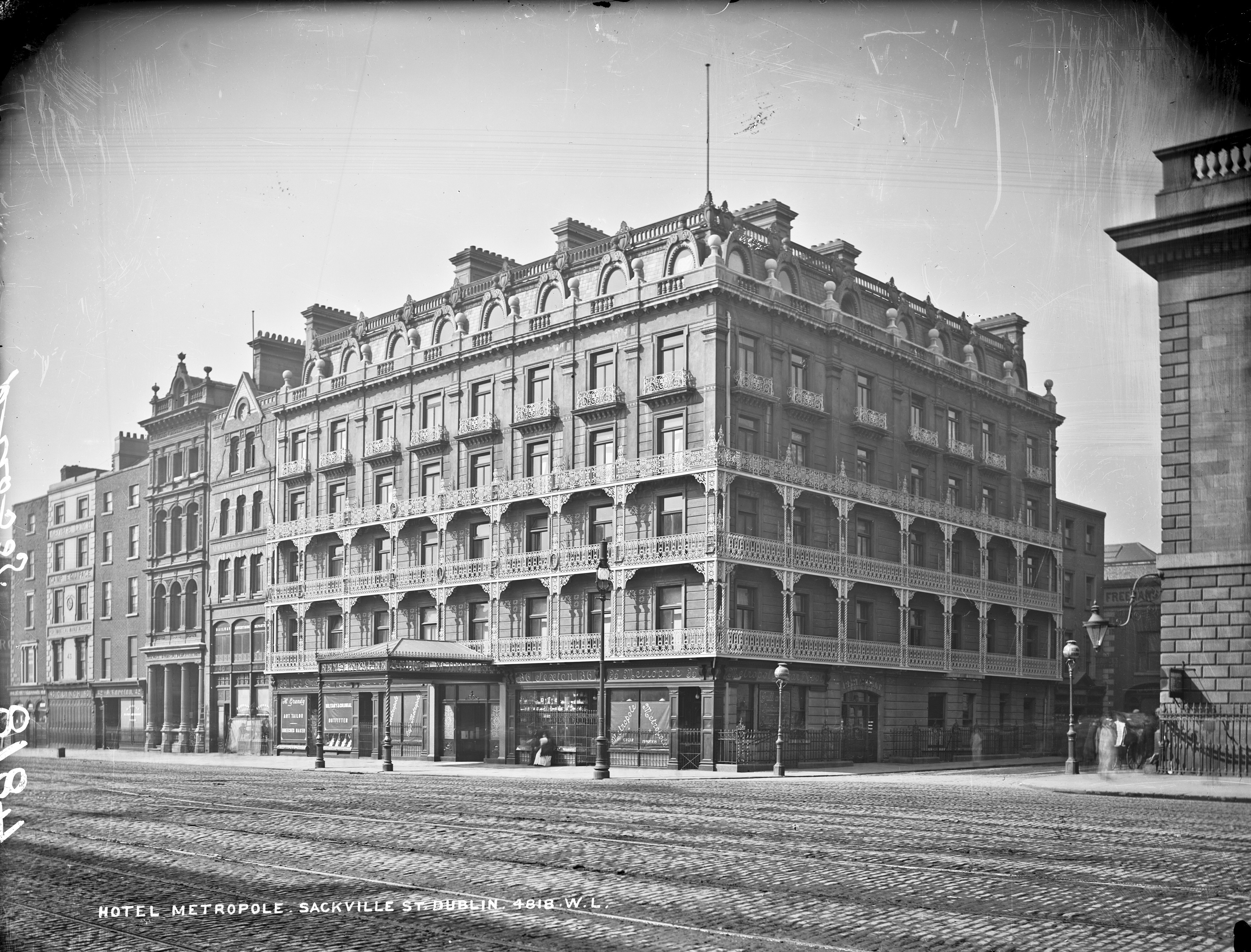
- The Hotel Metropole around the year 1900
- Former names: Prince of Wales Hotel

General information
- Status: Closed and demolished
- Type: Hotel
- Classification: 4 stars
- Location: 35-39 O'Connell Street Upper, Dublin 1, Dublin, Ireland
- Opened: 1893
- Demolished: 1916

Technical details
- Floor count: 6

Design and construction
- Architect: William Mitchell

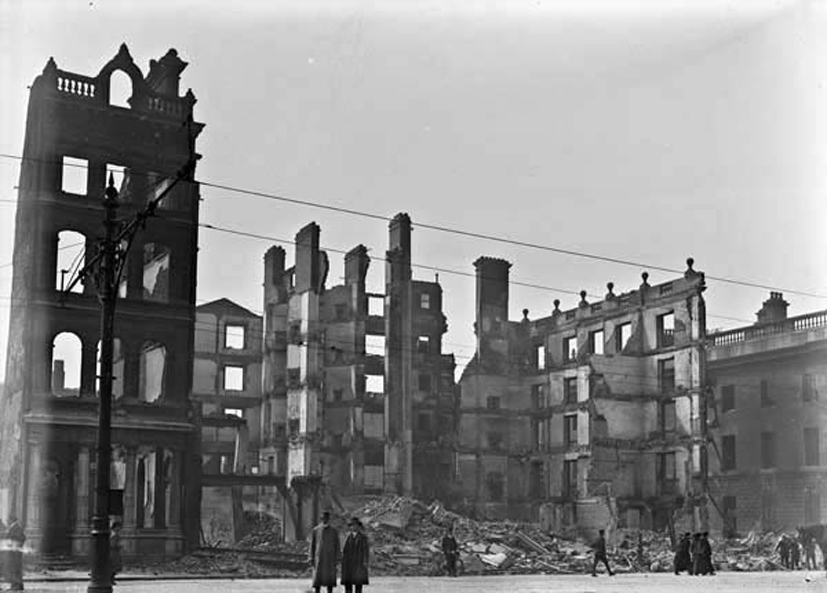
Skeleton of the Metropole Hotel after destruction in May 1916

The Hotel Metropole (The Met) was a notable landmark hotel in Dublin, Ireland. It was located next to the General Post Office building in O'Connell Street. Originally four Georgian buildings, they were combined to form a unified hotel in a high-french style by architect William M. Mitchell in 1891–93. Various architectural additions and embellishments were included to make the building look more French including a mansard roof with rounded dormer windows. This followed the style other Dublin hotels were adopting at the time including the Shelbourne Hotel and nearby the Jury's Hotel at College Green.

The building was badly damaged during the Easter Rising and the remains were ultimately demolished. The hotel's owners received significant compensation following the final report of the Property Losses (Ireland) Committee.

== Metropole Cinema ==
In 1922, a neoclassical building, designed by Aubrey V. O'Rourke, was built out of the ruins – The Metropole –– and this building included a cinema and a ballroom, as well as a couple of bars and a restaurant, the Georgian Room. The Met closed on 11 March 1972 and the building was sold to British Home Stores who demolished it.

== Penneys ==
The replacement was a modernist nondescript modern retail building constructed by G&T Crampton in 1977. As of 2022, the building houses a large Penneys shop.
