= O'Connell Street =

Key street of Dublin, Ireland

- Gardiner's Mall
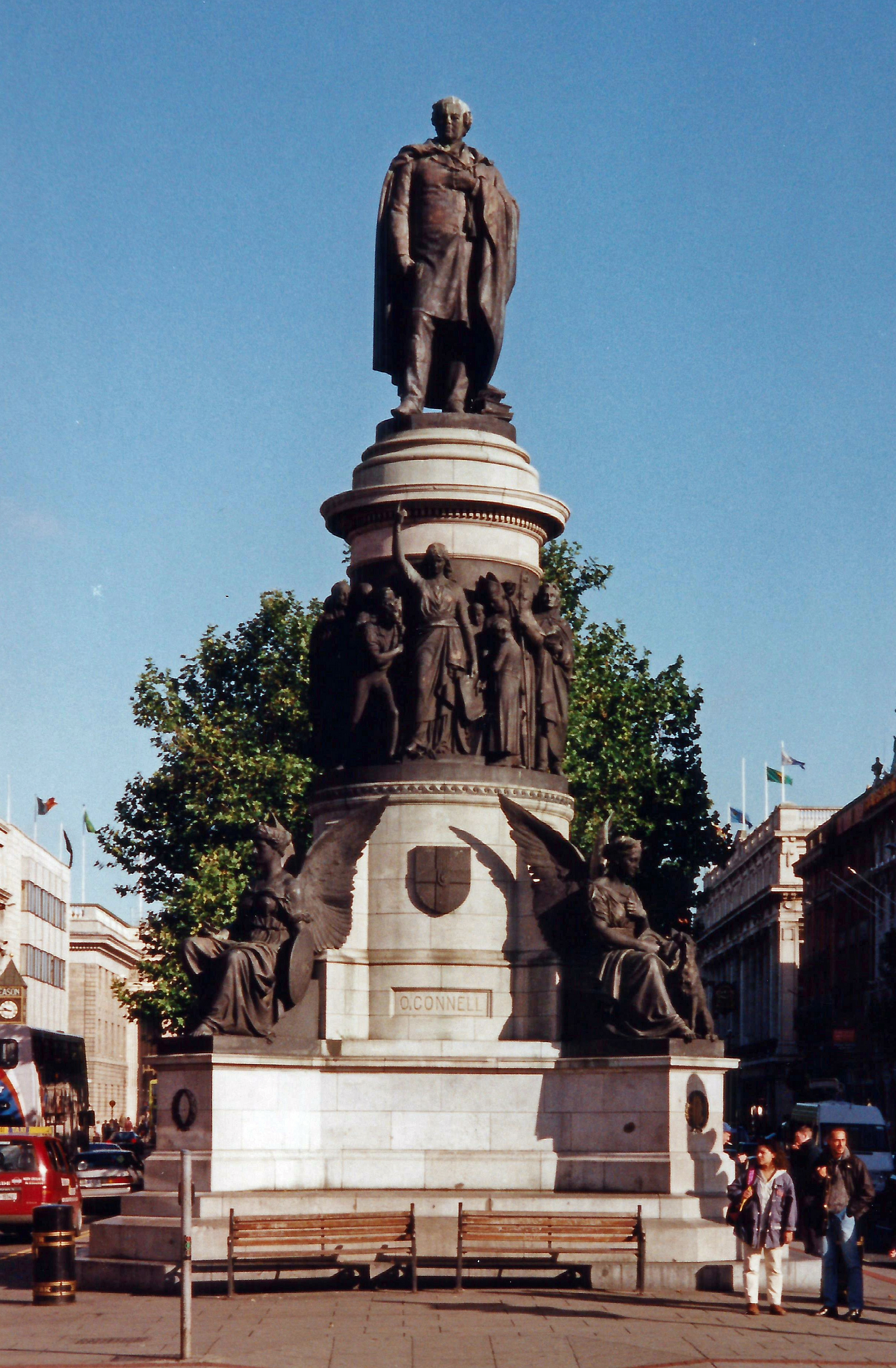
- The O'Connell Monument. A memorial to 19th-century leader Daniel O'Connell by John Henry Foley, which stands at the entrance to the street

- Location within Central Dublin
- Native name: Sráid Uí Chonaill (Irish)
- Former name: Drogheda Street Sackville Street
- Length: 0.5 km (0.31 mi)
- Location: Dublin, Ireland
- Nearest Tram station: O'Connell Street (Upper), O'Connell Street (GPO) (Luas)
- Coordinates: 53°20′58″N 6°15′37″W
- North end: Parnell Street
- South end: River Liffey

Other
- Known for: General Post Office

O'Connell Street (Irish: Sráid Uí Chonaill) is a street in the centre of Dublin, Ireland, running north from the River Liffey. It connects the O'Connell Bridge to the south with Parnell Street to the north and is roughly split into two sections bisected by Henry Street. The Luas tram system runs along the street.

During the 17th century, it was a narrow street known as Drogheda Street, named after Henry Moore, 1st Earl of Drogheda. It was widened in the late 18th century by the Wide Streets Commission and renamed Sackville Street (Sráid Saicfil) after Lionel Sackville, 1st Duke of Dorset. In 1924, it was renamed in honour of nationalist leader Daniel O'Connell, whose statue by John Henry Foley stands at the lower end of the street facing O'Connell Bridge.

The street has played an important part in Irish history and features several important monuments, including statues of O'Connell and trade union leader James Larkin, as well as the Spire of Dublin. It formed the backdrop to one of the 1913 Dublin lock-out gatherings, the 1916 Easter Rising, the Irish Civil War of 1922, the destruction of Nelson's Pillar in 1966 and the Dublin riots of 2006 and 2023. In the late 20th century, a comprehensive plan was begun to restore the street to its original 19th-century character.

== Location ==
O'Connell Street is located on the north side of Dublin city, and runs northwards from O'Connell Bridge towards Parnell Square. The street is approximately 1,980 feet (600 m) long and 150 feet (46 m) wide, with two broad carriageways at either side of a central pathway occupied by various monuments and statues. It has previously been part of the N1, a major road from Dublin to Belfast. There are two Luas tram stops along the street, O'Connell GPO and O'Connell Upper. The street has a number of bus stops for Dublin Bus and other bus companies, with many cross-city and north-bound services stopping there.

== Development ==
=== Drogheda Street ===
O'Connell Street evolved from the earlier 17th-century Drogheda Street, laid out by Henry Moore, 1st Earl of Drogheda. It was a third of the width of the present-day O'Connell Street, located on the site of the modern eastern carriageway and extending from Parnell Street to the junction with Abbey Street.

=== Sackville Street (Gardiner's Mall) ===
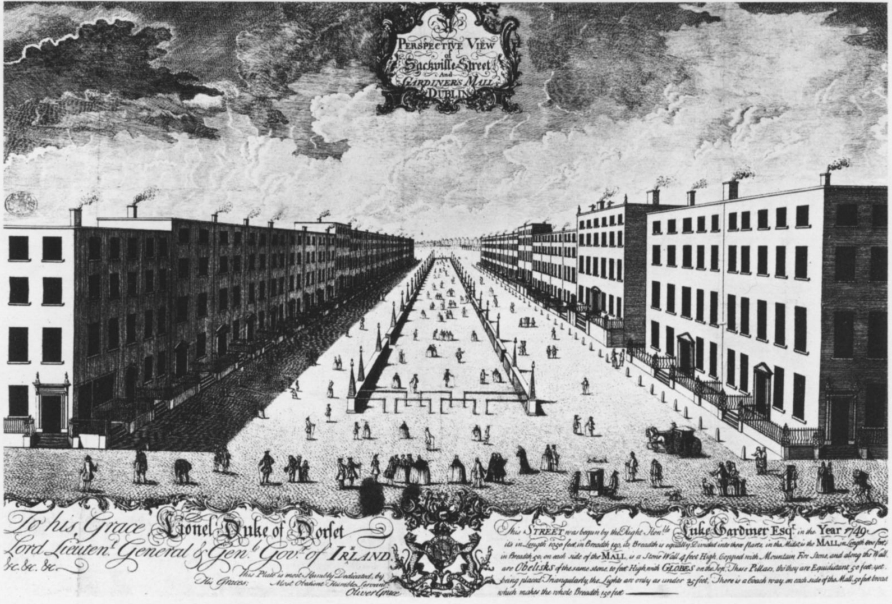
Sackville Street and Gardiner's Mall in the 1750s

In the 1740s, the banker and property developer Luke Gardiner acquired the upper part of Drogheda Street extending down to Henry Street as part of a land deal. He demolished the western side of Drogheda Street, creating an exclusive elongated residential square 1,050 feet (320 m) long and 150 feet (46 m) wide, thus establishing the scale of the modern-day thoroughfare.

A number of properties were built along the new western side of the street, while the eastern side had many mansions, the grandest of which was Drogheda House rented by the sixth Earl of Drogheda and sat on the corner of Cathedral Street. Gardiner also laid out a mall down the central section of the street, lined with low granite walls and obelisks. It was planted with trees a few years later. He titled the new development Sackville Street after the then Lord Lieutenant of Ireland Lionel Cranfield Sackville, Duke of Dorset. It was also known as 'Sackville Mall', and 'Gardiner's Mall'. However, due to the limited lands owned by the Gardiners in this area, the Rotunda Hospital sited just off the street at the bottom of Parnell Square – also developed by the family – was not built on axis with Sackville Street, terminating the vista. It had been Gardiner's intention to connect the new street through to the river, however, he died in 1755, with his son Charles taking over the estate.

Work did not start until 1757 when the city's planning body, the Wide Streets Commission, obtained a financial grant from Parliament. For the next 10 years work progressed in demolishing a myriad of dwellings and other buildings, laying out the new roadway and building new terraces. The Wide Streets Commission had envisaged and realised matching terraces of unified and proportioned façades extending from the river. Because of a dispute over land, a plot on the northwest of the street remained vacant; this later became the General Post Office (GPO), which opened in 1814.

In 1764, an English traveller named John Bush visited Dublin and made the following assessment of the street: "There are on this side (north of the Liffey) many spacious and regular streets: one in particular in the north-east part of the town. Sackville-Street, about 70 feet wide or nearly, with a mall enclosed with a low wall...". Bush, however, bemoaned the failures of the builder for not having aligned the street with the Rotunda Hospital at its northern end.

The street became a commercial success upon the opening of Carlisle Bridge, designed by James Gandon, in 1792 for pedestrians and in 1795 for all traffic. Percy Bysshe Shelley lived for a time at number 7.

== 19th century ==
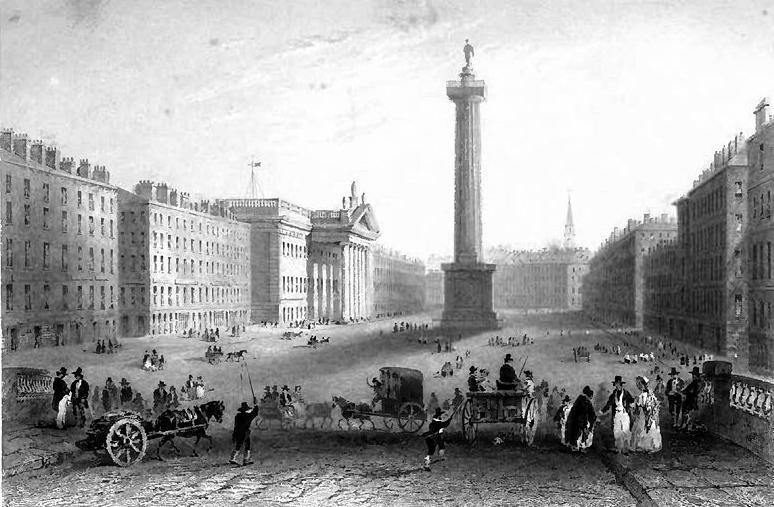
Sackville Street in 1842

Sackville Street prospered in the 19th century, though there was some difference between the Upper and Lower streets. Lower Sackville Street became successful as a commercial location; its terraces are ambitiously lined with purpose-designed retail units. Consequently, a difference between the two ends of the street developed: the planned lower end is successful and bustling next to the river, and the upper end features a mixture of less prominent businesses and old townhouses. Upon his visit to Dublin in 1845, William Makepeace Thackeray observed the street was "broad and handsome" but noted the upper section featured less distinctive architecture and had a distinct lack of patronage.

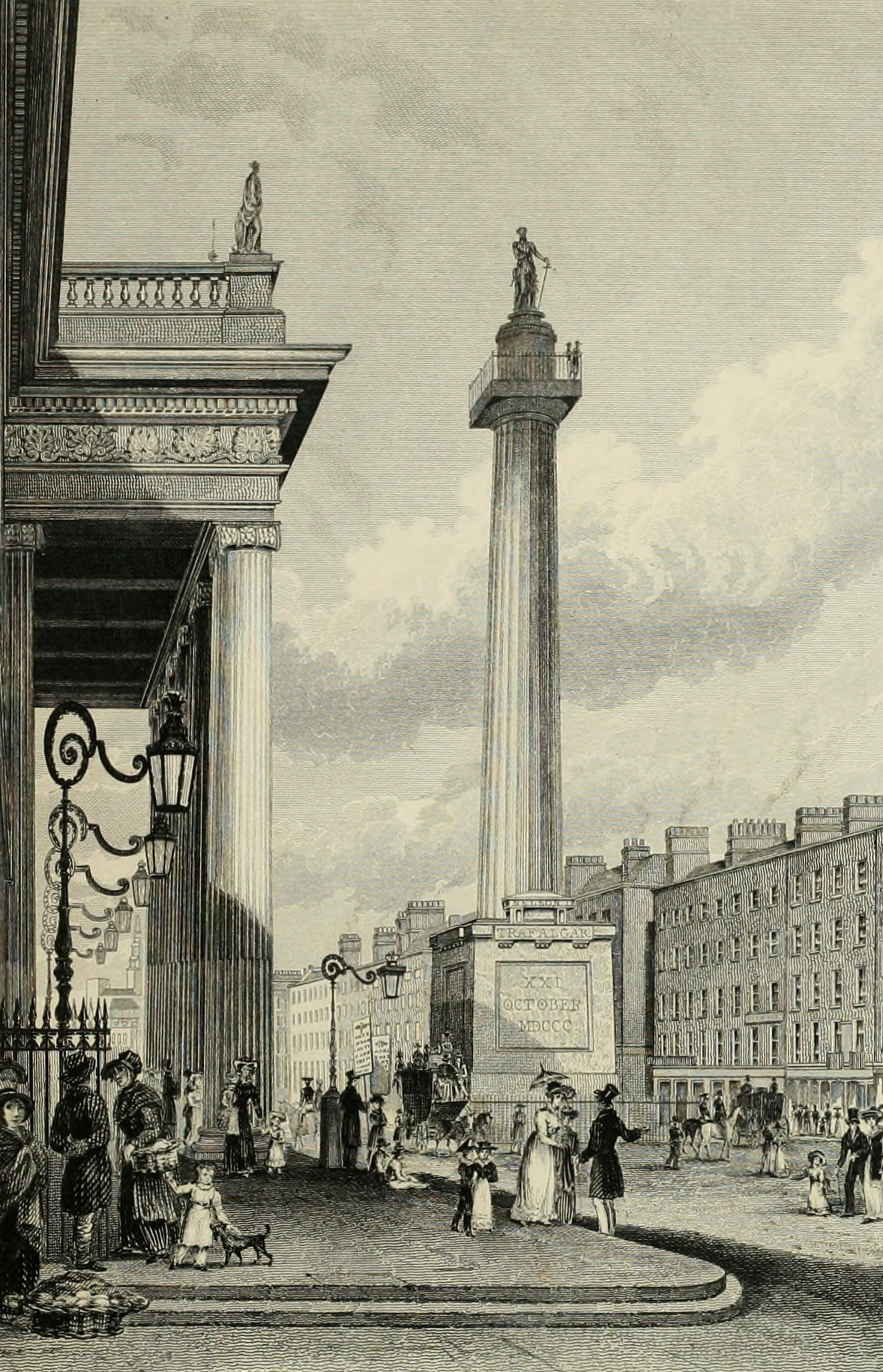
View of the Pillar and General Post Office c. 1830

During the 19th century, Sackville Street changed in character from the Wide Streets Commission design into a boulevard of individual buildings. One of the world's first purpose-built department stores was such a building: Delany's New Mart 'Monster Store' which opened in 1853, was later purchased by the Clery family. It also housed the Imperial Hotel. Across the road, another elaborate hotel was built next to the GPO: the Hotel Metropole, in a high-French style. Similarly, the Gresham Hotel opened on numbers 21 and 22 in 1817 to the north of the street in adjoining Georgian townhouses and was later remodelled as it became more successful.

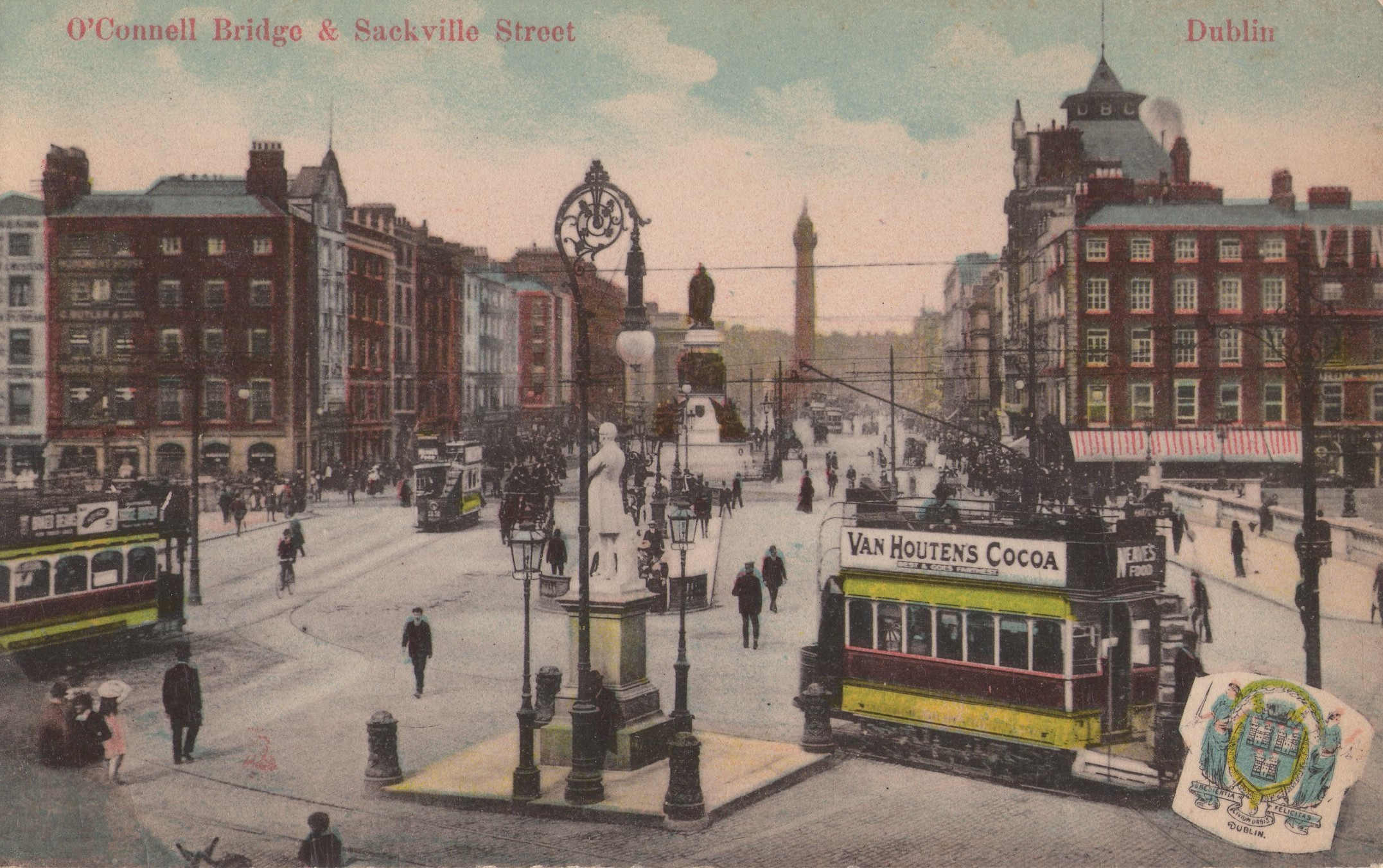
Sackville Street (and the bridge), with trams, c. 1905

As the fortunes of Upper Sackville Street began to improve in the second half of the century, other businesses began to open such as the Victorian Turkish baths built at the rear of Reynold's Hotel, and opened in 1869 as the renamed Hammam Family Hotel and Turkish Baths. Standard Life Assurance built their flagship Dublin branch on the street, while the Findlater family opened a branch of their successful chain close to Parnell Street, as did Gilbey's Wine Merchants. The thoroughfare also became the centre of the Dublin tramways system, with many of the city's trams converging at the Nelson Pillar. Conradh na Gaeilge was founded in number 9 in 1893. By 1900, Sackville Street had become an important location for shopping and business, which led to it being called "Ireland's Main Street".

During the 19th century, the street began to be known as "O'Connell Street", though this was considered by some to be a "nationalist" name. Dublin Corporation was anxious as early as the 1880s to change the name but faced considerable objections from residents and business owners on the street. With the unveiling of the O'Connell Monument on the street in 1882 and subsequent renaming of the Carlisle Bridge as O'Connell Bridge in his honour, it marked "an important move away from commemorating only members of the Castle administration or the British royal family" in the street, according to a 2003 report commissioned by Dublin City Council.

Despite objections, the Corporation passed a resolution to rename the street in December 1884, but in 1885, aggrieved locals, with the Attorney General of Ireland arguing their case, secured a Court order holding that the Corporation lacked the powers to make such a change. The necessary powers were granted in 1890, but it may have been felt best to allow the new name to become popular; over the years the name O'Connell Street gradually gained popular acceptance, and the name was changed officially, without any protest, in 1924.

== Easter Rising and Independence ==
On 31 August 1913, O'Connell Street saw the worst incident in the Dublin lock-out, a major dispute between workers and the police. During a speech given by workers' rights activist James Larkin, police charged through the attending crowd and arrested him. The crowd began to riot, resulting in two deaths, 200 arrests and numerous injuries.

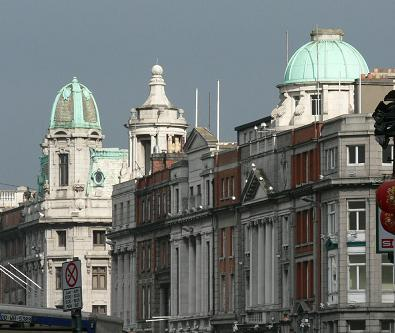
Buildings in Lower O'Connell Street, constructed between 1918 and 1923

During the Easter Rising of 1916, Irish republicans seized the General Post Office and proclaimed the Irish Republic, leading to the street's bombardment for a number of days by the Royal Navy gunboat HMY Helga and several other artillery pieces which were brought up to fire on the north of the street. The thoroughfare also saw sustained small arms and sniper fire from surrounding areas. By Saturday, the rebels had been forced to abandon the GPO, which was burning, and held out in Moore Street until they surrendered.

Much of the street was reduced to rubble, the damaged areas including the whole eastern side of the street as far north as Cathedral Street, and the terrace in between the GPO and Abbey Street on the western side. In addition, during the chaos that accompanied the rebellion, the inhabitants of the nearby slums looted many of the shops on O'Connell Street. The events had a disastrous impact on the commercial life of the inner city, causing around £2.5 million worth of damage. Some businesses were closed up to 1923 or never reopened.

In the immediate aftermath of the Rising, the destruction of the street resulted in the majority of major claims to the Property Losses (Ireland) Committee. The Dublin Reconstruction (Emergency Provisions) Act 1916 was drafted with the aim of controlling the nature of reconstruction in the local area. The aim was to rebuild in a coherent and dignified fashion, using the opportunity to modernise the nature of commercial activity. Under the act, the city was to approve all construction and reject anything that would not fit with the street's character. The reconstruction was supervised and by City Architect Horace T. O'Rourke. With the exception of its Sackville Street façade and portico, the General Post Office was destroyed. A new GPO was subsequently built behind the 1818 façade. Work began in 1924, with the Henry Street side the first to be erected with new retail units at street level, a public shopping arcade linking through to Princes Street, and new offices on the upper floors. The Public Office underneath the portico on O'Connell Street reopened in 1929.

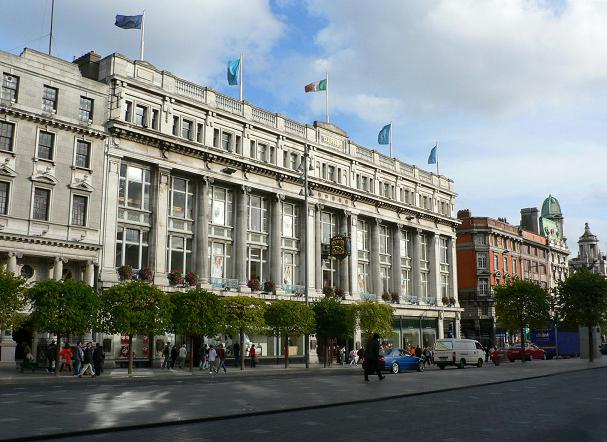
Clerys department store, (pictured in 2006) rebuilt in 1922

O'Connell Street saw another pitched battle in July 1922, on the outbreak of the Irish Civil War, when anti-treaty fighters under Oscar Traynor occupied the street after pro-treaty Irish National Army troops attacked the republican garrison in the nearby Four Courts. Fighting lasted from 28 June until 5 July, when the National Army troops brought artillery up to point-blank range, under the cover of armoured cars, to bombard the Republican-held buildings. Among the casualties was Cathal Brugha, shot at close range. The effects of the week's fighting were largely confined to the northern end of the street, with the vast majority of the terrace north of Cathedral Street to Parnell Square being destroyed, as well as a few buildings on the north-western side. In total, around three-quarters of the properties on the street were destroyed or demolished between 1916 and 1922. As a result, only one Georgian townhouse remains on the street into the 21st century.

Because of the extensive destruction and rebuilding, most of the buildings on O'Connell Street date from the early 20th century. The only remaining original building still standing is No. 42, which has been owned by the Royal Dublin Hotel since 1972. This house was originally the home of the State physician and professor of anatomy at Trinity College, Robert Robinson and later Daniel O'Connell's Catholic Commercial Club. The building dates from 1752 and was designed by Richard Cassels. There were plans to incorporate the house into the hotel to provide additional bars and function space in 1975 and 1978, but the work was never carried out. Permission was sought in 1982 to demolish the house, but this was refused. Apart from the GPO building, other significant properties rebuilt after the hostilities include the department store Clerys, which reopened in August 1922. and the Gresham Hotel which reopened in 1927.

== Regeneration ==
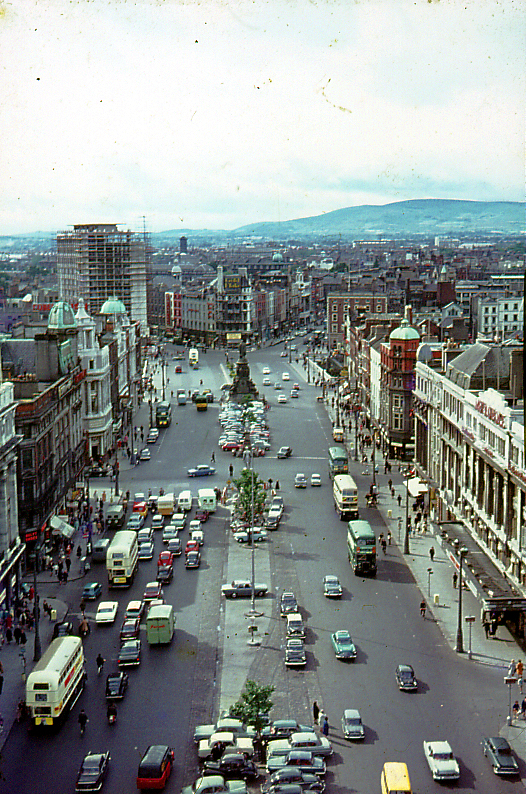
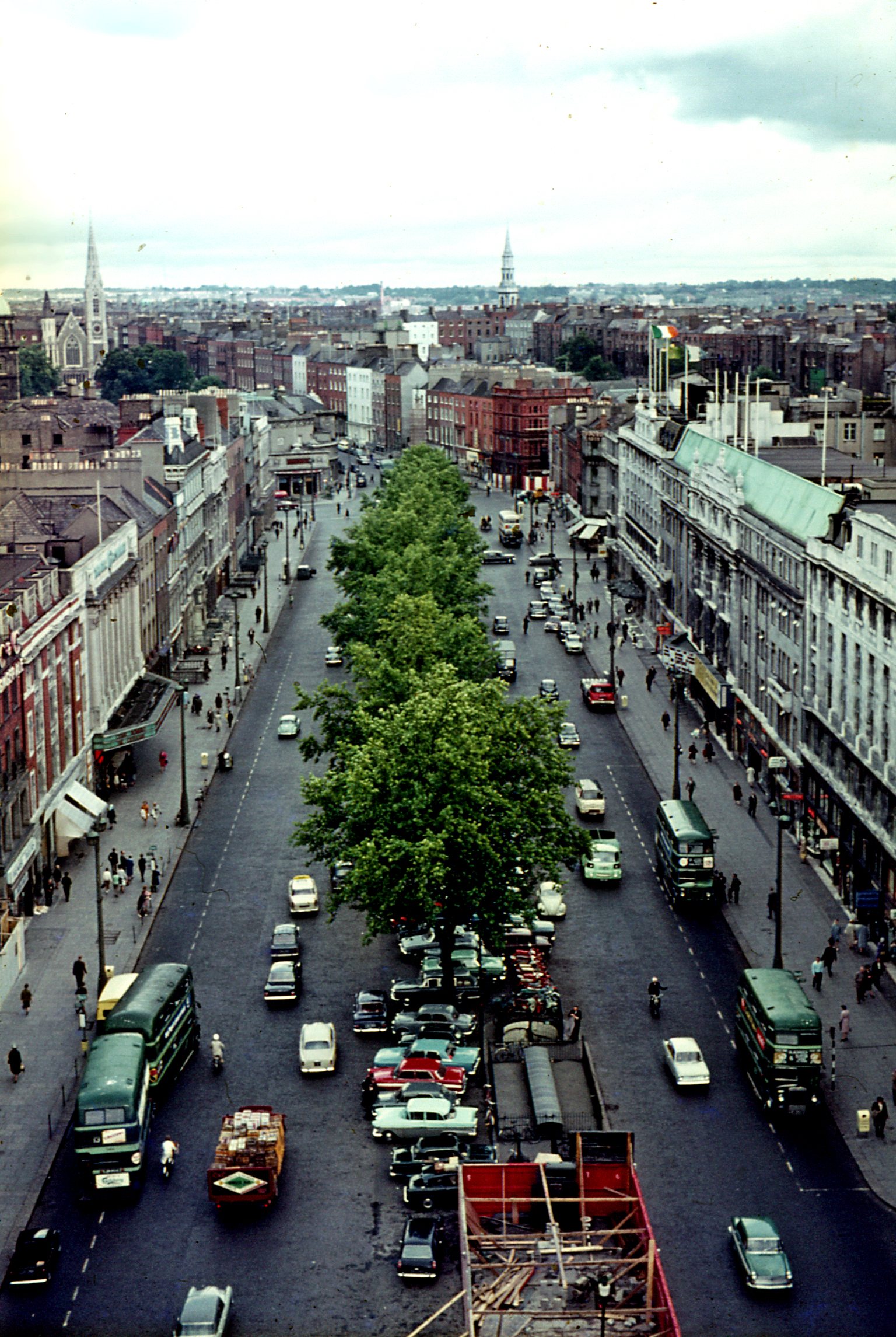
Views from the pillar in 1964, looking south (left) and north (right)

Despite improvements to the street's architectural coherence between 1916 and 1922, the street has since suffered from a lack of planning. Like much of Dublin of that time, property speculators and developers were allowed to construct what were widely accepted to be inappropriately designed buildings, often entailing the demolition of historic properties in spite of its Conservation Area status. Frank McDonald dates the turn in the Street's fortune as the blowing up of Nelson's Pillar, contending that the loss of the pillar led to a decline in the character and overall cohesion of the area. The loss of the Pillar was also the loss of a significant landmark, a meeting place, and a popular tourist spot on the north side of the city. Several Victorian and 1920s buildings were demolished in the 1960s and 1970s. One of the earliest examples was the demolition of two house facades by CIÉ in 1961 to make way for the passenger information bureau. The new structure has a glazed curtain wall with stained glass panels by Evie Hone. Another demolition was of Gilbey's at the northern end of the street. This building featured a high Victorian Romanesque facade, a porch, and a crested roof. It was demolished in March 1973, with two stone heads of Gladstone and Palmerston salvaged and set in above the new entrance. Originally designed as a mixed development with retail and offices, the entire building was rented by Dublin City Council from 1975, and then the ground floor was set out as a sound-proofed council chamber.

The Metropole and Capitol cinemas next to the GPO were demolished in 1973, McDonald noting this removed the central social hub of O'Connell Street. As well as being cinemas, the Capitol had lounges, meeting rooms, cafes and a restaurant, while the Metropole had a ballroom, restaurants and bars. The site was levelled and redeveloped for British Home Stores. It occupied the site, with Mothercare and Habitat, until 1992, when it closed the store. It was then taken over by a branch of Penney's. Findlater's grocer and wine merchant's premises on the corner of O'Connell Street and Cathal Brugha Street was demolished in 1972 and replaced with a five-storey office block with retail at ground level. This is among the newer buildings that disrupted the proportions that had been strictly enforced across the streetscape by O'Rourke during the reconstruction in the 1920s.

Among the last intact Wide Streets Commission buildings on the street dating from the 1780s, numbers 40 and 41 were demolished in 1968 to make way for the Royal Dublin Hotel. Designed by Patrick Carr, it was the first hotel built in Dublin since the Gresham in the 1920s and opened in 1970. This hotel was in turn demolished after its closure in 2008 and has remained a vacant site. Along with the other vacant site beside the former Carlton Cinema, and the Carlton itself have been part of a plan to develop the site as a large shopping centre that would connect with Moore Street. The so-called "Carlton site" encompasses almost six acres facing onto O'Connell, Moore, Parnell and Henry Streets. This vacant site immediately to the right of the Carlton was Gill's bookshop and a branch of Penney's until 1979 when it was purchased by the Bank of Ireland. Gill's was destroyed by fire while vacant and later collapsed in September 1979, leading to both buildings being levelled.

Many of the older buildings were replaced with fast-food restaurants, shops and offices, that continue to be the main features along O'Connell Street in the 21st century. In late 2025, retail rents on O'Connell Street were half that of Henry Street, and a third of rents on Grafton Street. There are a small number of licensed stall holders who still sell on the street and only some residential units on the upper floors of the buildings on the street.

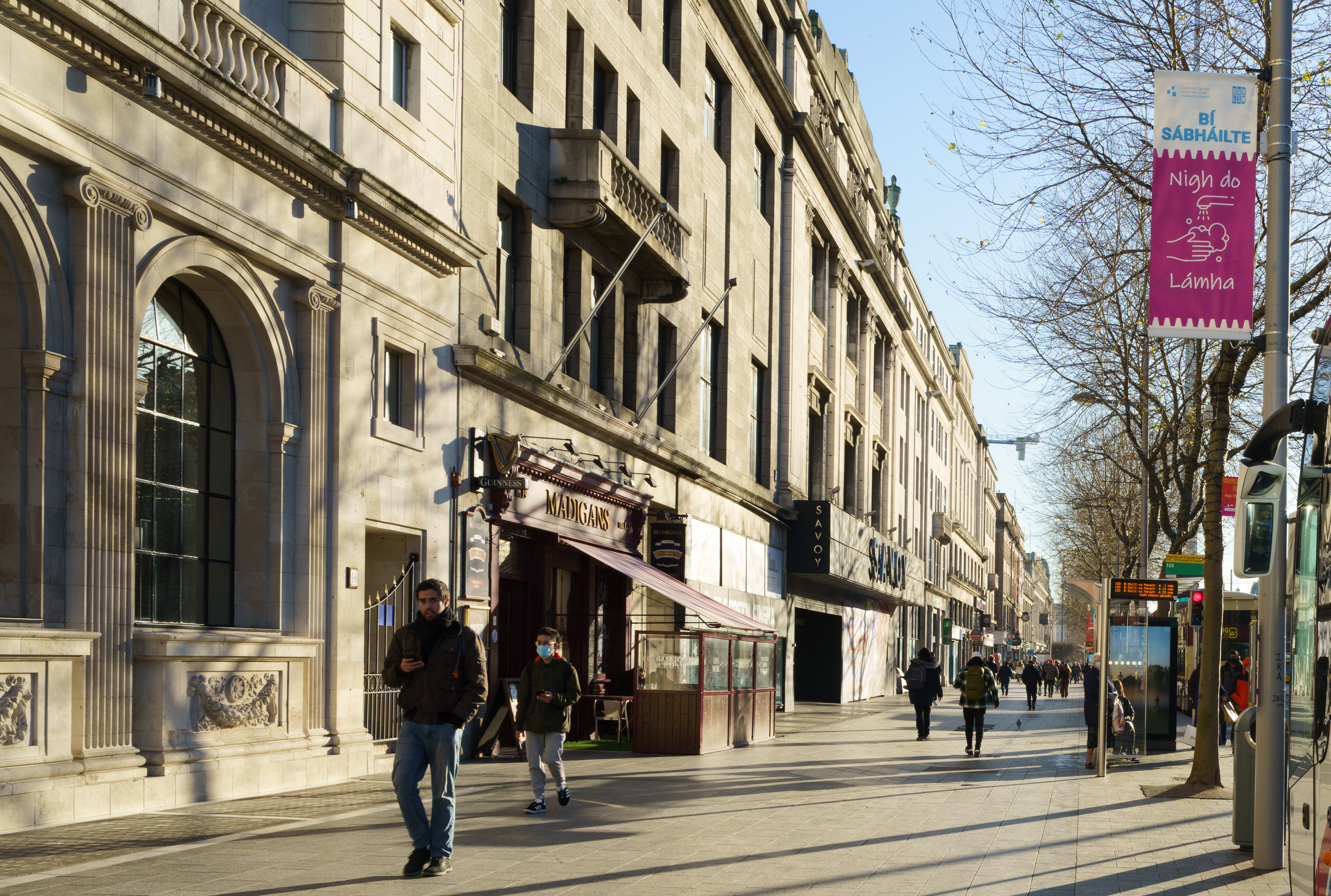
Upper O'Connell Street in 2022.

The street was given attention with Dublin City Council's O'Connell Street Integrated Area Plan (IAP) which was unveiled in 1998 with the aim of restoring the street to its former status. The plan was designed to go beyond simple cosmetic changes, and introduce control of the wider area beyond the street's buildings, including pedestrian and vehicle interaction, governance and preservation of architecture. Work on the plan was delayed, and reached approval in June 2003.

The main features of the plan included the widening of footpaths and a reduction in road space, removing and replacing all trees, a new plaza in front of the GPO, and new street furnishings including custom-designed lampposts, litter bins and retail kiosks. The plan included the Spire of Dublin project, Dublin's tallest sculpture; constructed between December 2002 and January 2003, occupying the site of Nelson's Pillar. Numerous monuments were restored, including those of late 19th century Irish political leader Charles Stewart Parnell, radical early 20th-century labour leader Jim Larkin, prominent businessman and nationalist MP Sir John Grey, and the most challenging of all: the conservation of the O'Connell Monument standing guard at the southern entrance to the thoroughfare. This project was worked on for a number of months by an expert team of bronze and stone conservators before being unveiled in May 2005.

All public domain works were completed in June 2006, finalising the principal objective of the IAP at a cost of €40 million. The loss of mature trees during this work has been cited as exposing and further highlighting the issues with the streetscape. Work was disrupted by a riot centred on the street which erupted on 25 February 2006. A protest against a planned Loyalist march degenerated into vandalism and looting, with building materials from the works in progress being used as weapons and for smashing windows and fixtures.

O'Connell Street has been designated an Architectural Conservation Area and an Area of Special Planning Control. This means that no buildings can be altered without Dublin City Council's permission, and fast food outlets, takeaways, cafes and amusement arcades are strictly controlled. A long-standing part of the architecture of the street have been the large advertisements mounted on buildings, including to Irish Nationwide on 1 Lower, the Happy Ring House at 3-4 Upper, Come In And Visit Funland on 67 Upper, and The Confectioner's Hall on 49 Lower.

In June 2015, Clerys suddenly closed after it was bought out by investment group Natrium Ltd, with the loss of over 400 jobs. In 2019, plans were announced to turn the premises into a four-star hotel.

The street is used as the main route of the annual St. Patrick's Day Parade, and as the setting for the 1916 Commemoration every Easter Sunday. It also serves as a major bus route artery through the city centre. The modern tram, the Luas, has undergone an extension and trams now run once again through O'Connell Street. It only travels in one direction, the return loop, to link the system at St. Stephen's Green, runs via Marlborough Street, parallel with and east of O'Connell Street.

== Flora and fauna ==
In his 1937 memoir The Way That I Went, Irish naturalist Robert Lloyd Praeger noted that "undoubtedly the most interesting zoological feature that Dublin has to offer is the Wagtail roost on O'Connell Street". Early in the winter of 1929, a number of pied wagtails settled in a London plane tree on the north side of Nelson's Pillar. The next autumn, approximately two thousand of the same species of bird reappeared, occupying three or four adjacent trees in the same area. Praeger noted that "...so large a colony in such apparently unsuitable surroundings is remarkable".

== Statues ==
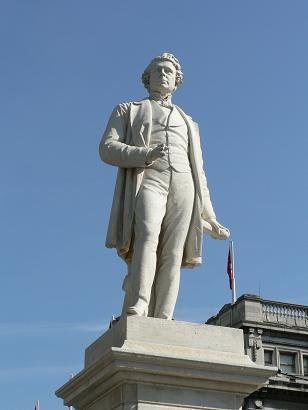
Sir John Gray, designed by Thomas Farrell and erected in 1879

Current and former monuments on O'Connell Street from south to north include:

Daniel O'Connell: designed and sculpted by John Henry Foley and completed by his assistant Thomas Brock. Construction began in 1866, and the monument was unveiled in 1883.

William Smith O'Brien: by Thomas Farrell. Originally erected in 1870 on an island at the O'Connell Bridge entrance to D'Olier Street, it was moved to O'Connell Street in 1929.

Sir John Gray: by Thomas Farrell. Both the plinth and statue were carved entirely of white Sicilian marble; it was unveiled in 1879. Gray was the proprietor of the Freeman's Journal newspaper and, as a member of Dublin Corporation, was responsible for the construction of the Dublin water supply system based on the Vartry Reservoir.

James Larkin: by Oisín Kelly. A bronze statue atop a Wicklow granite plinth, the monument was unveiled in 1980.

Anna Livia: by Eamonn O'Doherty. Constructed in granite and unveiled on 17 June 1988, it quickly became known by its nickname "The Floosy in the Jacuzzi". It was removed in 2001 as part of the reconstruction plans for O'Connell Street and moved to the Croppies' Acre Memorial Park in 2011.

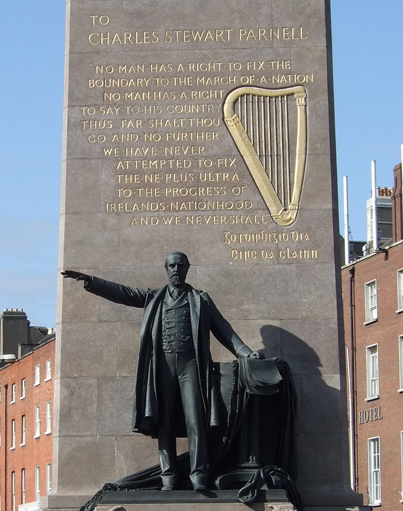
The Parnell Monument at the north end of O'Connell Street

Nelson's Pillar, a 36.8 m (121 ft) granite Doric column erected in 1808 in honour of Admiral Lord Nelson, formerly stood at the centre of the street on the site of the present-day Spire of Dublin. Blown up by republican activists in 1966, the site remained vacant until the erection of the Spire in 2003.

Father Theobald Mathew: by Mary Redmond. The foundation stone was laid in 1890, and the monument was unveiled in 1893. In 2016, the statue was removed to cater for the Luas tram extension to the north of the city. It was restored in 2018 to a new location near The Spire.

Charles Stewart Parnell: The Parnell Monument by Irish-American sculptor Augustus Saint-Gaudens. The 37 ft high obelisk sits on a Galway granite pylon, was organised by John Redmond and paid for through public subscription and was unveiled in 1911 at the junction with Parnell Street, just south of Parnell Square.

== See also ==
- 2023 Dublin riot
- List of streets and squares in Dublin
- Streets and squares in Dublin
