= Cathedral Street, Dublin =

Street in Dublin, Ireland

Cathedral Street
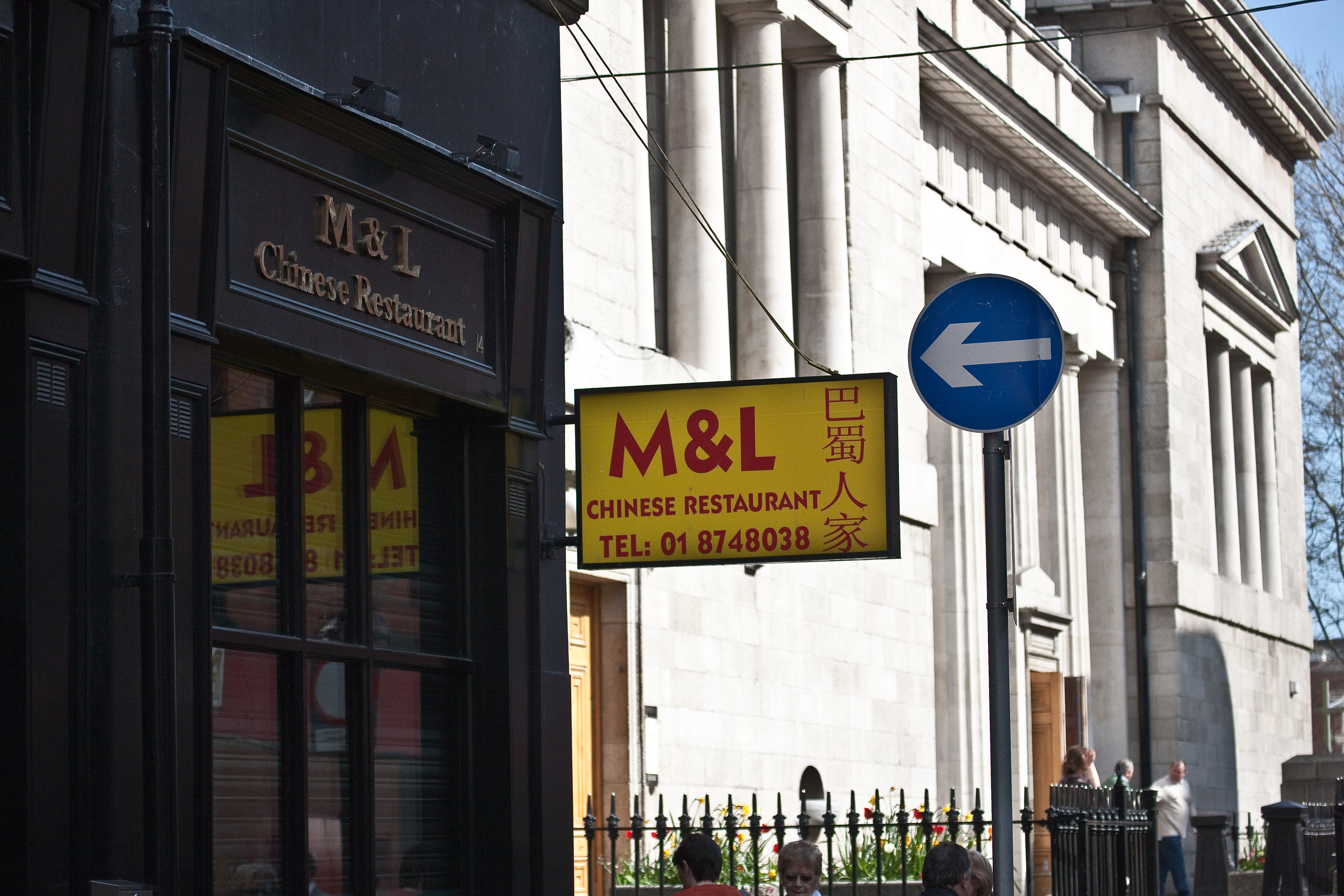

- Location within Central Dublin
- Native name: Sráid na hArdeaglaise (Irish)
- Former names: Elephant Lane (until 1870); Tyrone Place (1870-1900)
- Namesake: St Mary's Cathedral
- Type: Street
- Length: 130 m (430 ft)
- Location: Dublin, Ireland
- Postal code: D01
- Coordinates: 53°21′02″N 6°15′34″W
- West end: O'Connell Street
- East end: Marlborough Street

Cathedral Street (Irish: Sráid na hArdeaglaise) is a street in central Dublin, Ireland, formerly known as Elephant Lane and Tyrone Place.

Cathedral Street runs from O'Connell Street Upper to Marlborough Street. St Mary's Cathedral is located on the corner of Cathedral and Marlborough Street.

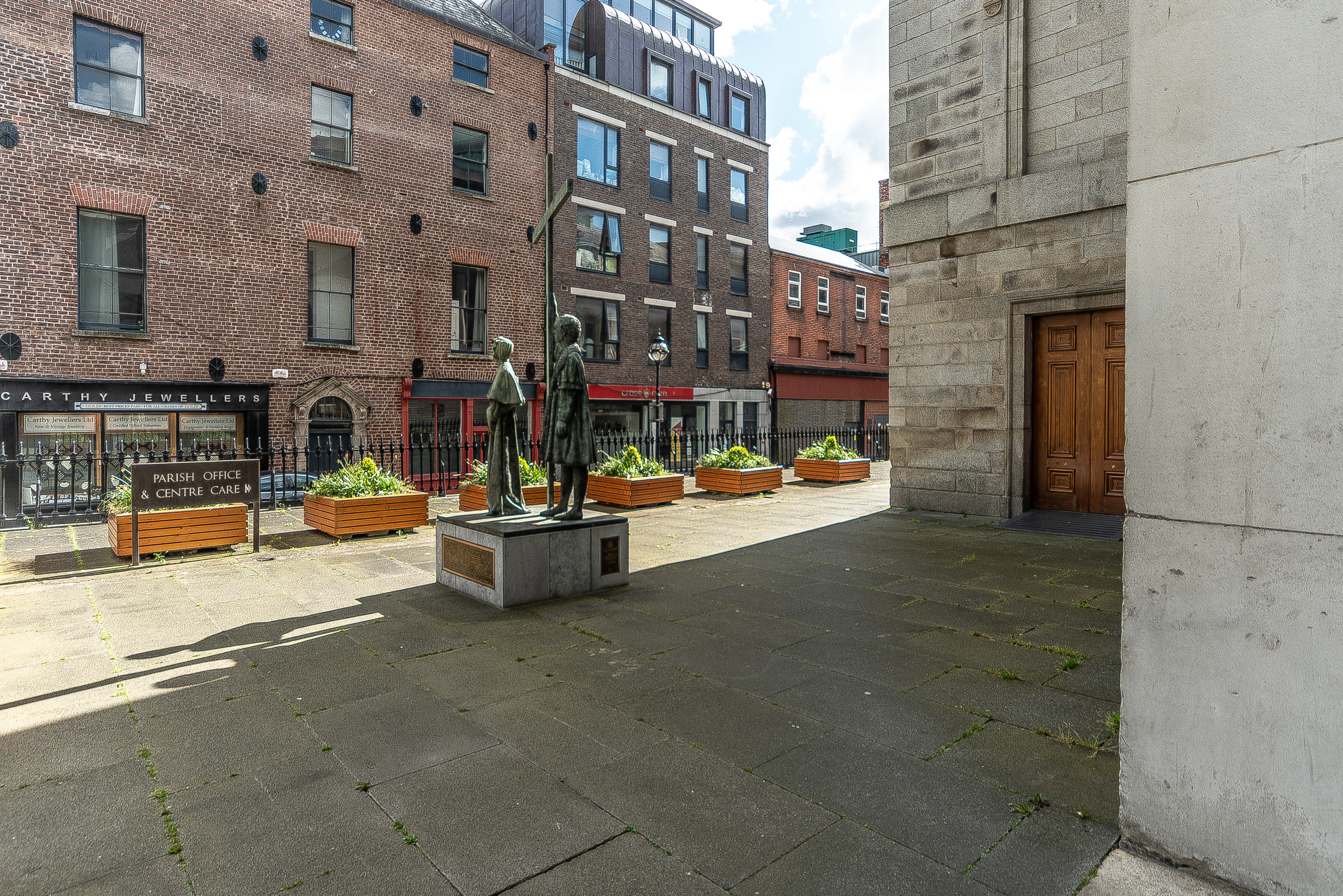
Dublin Martyrs memorial at Cathedral side of St Mary's Cathedral

== History ==
In John Rocque's map of Dublin of 1756, the lane is simply referred to as (a) Stable Lane.

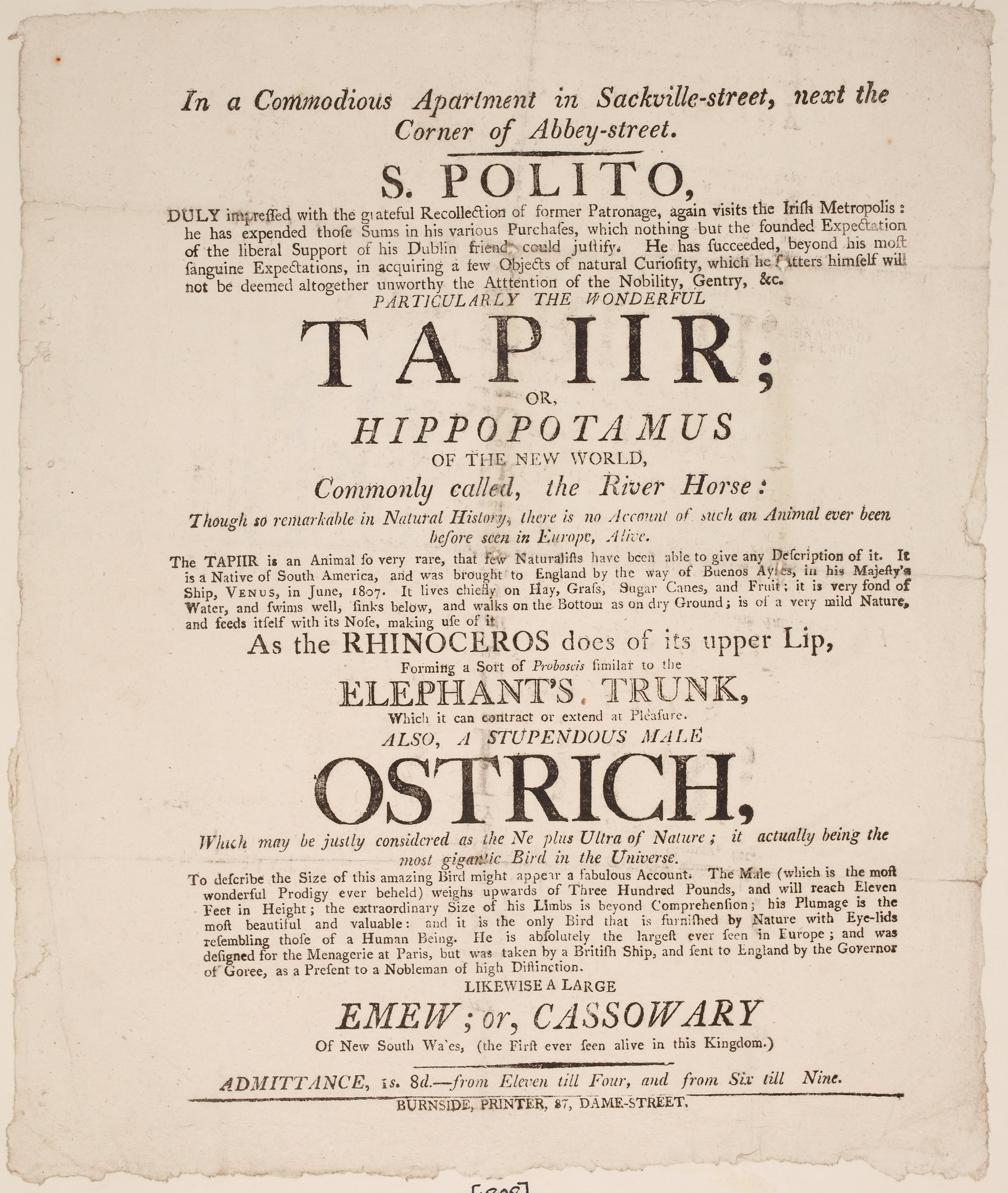
Poster for 1804 exhibition of wild animals on Sackville Street

On later 18th century maps of Dublin, this street is named Elephant Lane. McCready attributes this to a corruption of Mellifont Lane, Menagerie Lane, or due to the presence of a tavern on the street with a sign featuring an elephant. The name may also be a reference to the various wild animal shows which occurred on the street in the Georgian period with other buildings on the opposite side of the street being referred to as 'Elephant House', this in turn may have influence the naming of nearby taverns.

According to the 1850 New City Pictorial Directory, besides four vacant buildings, Elephant Lane's occupants included, a plumber, locksmith, job coach establishment, an ivory turner, two booksellers and two vintners.

The street was later known as Tyrone Place from 1870 due to it leading to Tyrone House, and was renamed Cathedral Street in 1900 for St Mary's Cathedral.

The Post Office Tavern was at No. 9 Elephant Lane and from 1854 run by a James Kenny until 1870 when he is the hotel and tavern keeper of the Post Office Hotel now noted to be in Tyrone Place. John Nagle is the proprietor of the establishment in 1875.

Drogheda House, city townhouse of the Earl of Drogheda, since demolished was on the corner of Cathedral Street and O'Connell Street, and dated from 1751. The eastern side of Cathedral Street survived the destruction of the Easter Rising in 1916 but was later destroyed during the Civil War in 1922.

Plans to refurbish Cathedral Street with Sackville Place to facilitate better pedestrian access between the Luas lines were scrapped in 2018.

== See also ==
- List of streets and squares in Dublin
