= General Post Office, Dublin =

Building in Dublin

General Post Office
- Ard-Oifig an Phoist
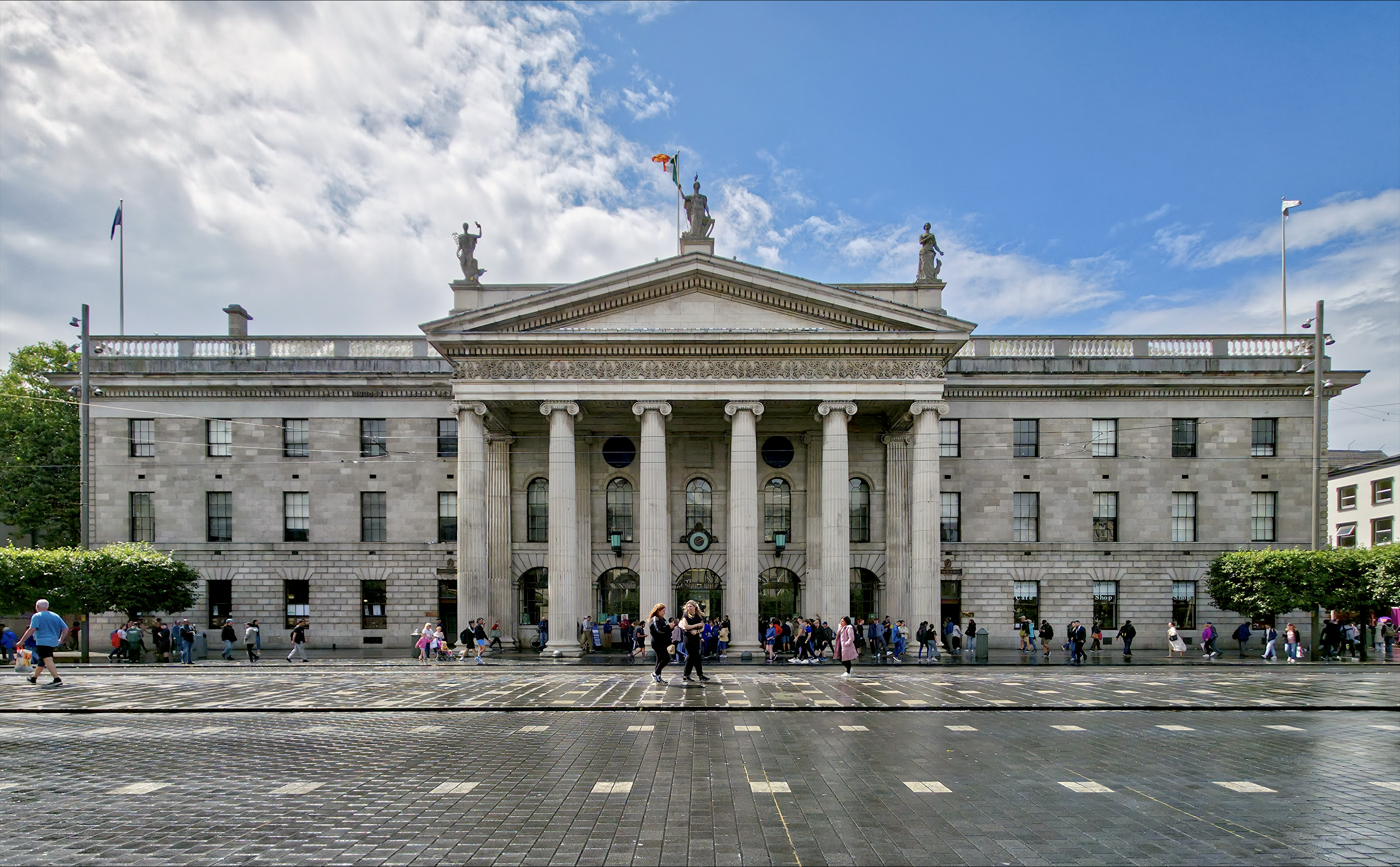
- The General Post Office in 2025

- Location within Central Dublin
- Alternative names: GPO

General information
- Type: Post office and administrative offices
- Architectural style: Greek Revival, neoclassical
- Location: O'Connell Street Lower; Dublin 1 D01 F5P2
- Coordinates: 53.349334°N 6.261075°W
- Construction started: 12 August 1814
- Inaugurated: 6 January 1818
- Cost: 50,000 pounds sterling
- Owner: Office of Public Works

Design and construction
- Architect: Francis Johnston

The General Post Office (GPO; Irish: Ard-Oifig an Phoist) is the former headquarters of An Post, the Irish postal service. It remains its registered office and the principal post office of Dublin, the capital city of Ireland. It is situated in the centre of O'Connell Street, the city's main thoroughfare. It is one of Ireland's most famous buildings, not least because it served as the headquarters of the leaders of the Easter Rising against British rule in Ireland. It was the last great Georgian public building to be erected in the capital.

== Architecture ==
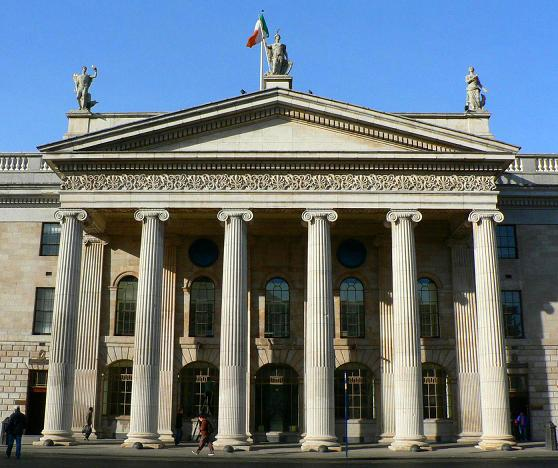
The Greek hexastyle portico of the General Post Office, completed in 1818. The royal coat of arms, similar to those at King's Inns and the Irish Houses of Parliament, was removed after independence.

The foundation stone of the building, which was designed by Francis Johnston, was laid by the Lord Lieutenant of Ireland, Charles Whitworth, 1st Earl Whitworth, on 12 August 1814, attended by the Post-Masters-General, Charles O'Neill, 1st Earl O'Neill and Laurence Parsons, 2nd Earl of Rosse. The structure was completed in the short space of approximately three years at a cost (depending on sources) of between £50,000 and £80,000.

The front elevation is 67.1 metres (220 ft) long. It features a portico (24.4 metres (80 ft) wide) of six fluted Ionic columns, 137.16 centimetres (54 inches) in diameter. The frieze of the entablature is highly enriched. The tympanum of the pediment originally carried the royal arms; following restoration in the 1920s, they were removed. On the acroteria of the pediment are three statues by John Smyth: when facing the building Mercury on the left, with his Caduceus and purse; Fidelity on the right, with a hound at her feet and a key held in her right hand (due to these features it is possible that the statue is in fact of Hecate); and Hibernia in the centre, resting on her spear and holding a harp. The entablature, with the exception of the architrave, is continued along the rest of the front; the frieze, however, is not decorated over the portico. A balustrade surmounts the cornice of the building, which is 15.2 metres (50 ft) from the ground.

With the exception of the portico, which is of Portland stone, the main building is of mountain granite. The elevation has three stories, of which the lower or basement is rusticated. The portico occupies the entire height of the structure.

The GPO Arcade is an art deco style shopping arcade at the rear of the complex, with access from Henry Street and Princes Street North. It was built by the Office of Public Works following the Rising. Local radio station, Millennium 88FM was based here.

== History ==
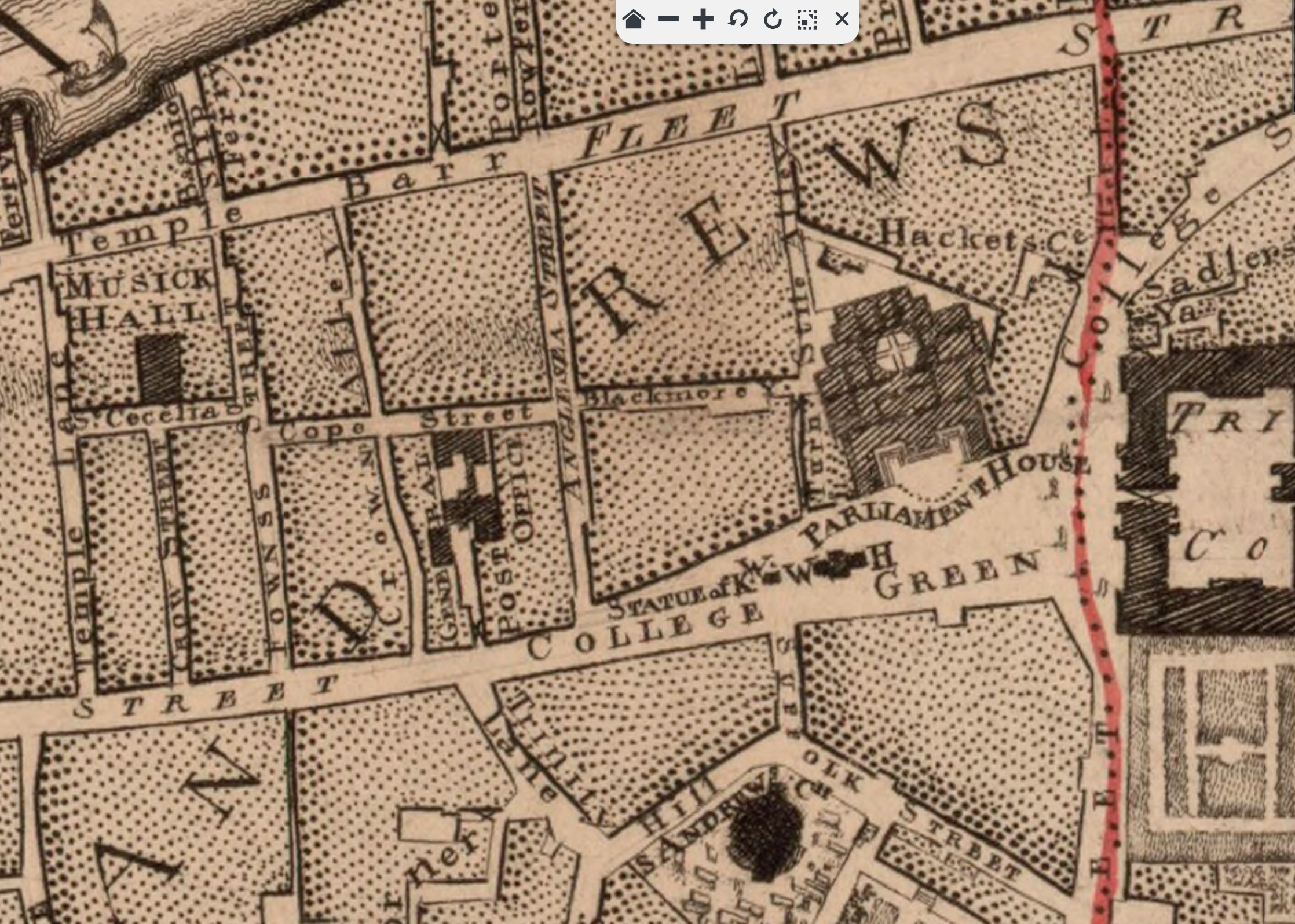
Map showing Dublin's General Post Office in the Cope Street area in 1757, the location of the Central Bank of Ireland building

The General Post Office in Ireland was first located in High Street in Dublin moving to Fishamble Street in 1689, to Sycamore Alley in 1709 and then in 1755 to Peter Bardin's Chocolate House at Fownes Court on the site where the Commercial Buildings used to be (later the Central Bank building). It was afterwards removed to a larger house opposite the Bank of Ireland building on College Green. On 6 January 1818, the new post office in Sackville Street (now O'Connell Street) was opened for business.

During the Easter Rising of 1916, the GPO served as the headquarters of the uprising's leaders. It was from outside this building on 24 April 1916, that Patrick Pearse read out the Proclamation of the Irish Republic. The building was destroyed by fire in the course of the rebellion, save for the granite facade, and not rebuilt until 1929, by the Irish Free State government. An original copy of the Proclamation of the Irish Republic was displayed in the museum at the GPO.

In anticipation of the 80th anniversary of the Easter Rising, in 1996, An Post commissioned a series of ten, large format, oil-on-canvas paintings by Irish artist Norman Teeling depicting key events of the Rising, including scenes at the GPO. The suite was displayed in the GPO's main hall until 2005.

The museum was closed at the end of May 2015 and replaced by a new visitor centre to commemorate the 1916 Rising, "GPO Witness History", in March 2016. The building has remained a symbol of Irish nationalism. In 1935, in commemoration of the Rising, a statue depicting the death of the mythical hero Cúchulainn sculpted by Oliver Sheppard in 1911 was installed at the command post in the centre of the GPO main hall and is now housed in the front of the building. The statue was featured on the Irish ten shilling coin of 1966, marking the fiftieth anniversary of the Rising. Despite its significance in the history of Irish independence, ground rent for the GPO continued to be paid to English and American landlords until the 1980s.

The broadcasting studios of 2RN, which later became Radio Éireann, had been located in the GPO from 1928 until 1976 and the completion of their move to a new Radio Centre at Donnybrook on the south side of Dublin.

Draws for Prize Bonds are held weekly, on Fridays, in the building.

Nelson's Pillar was located in the centre of O'Connell Street adjacent to the GPO, until it was destroyed by Irish republicans in an explosion in 1966. The Spire of Dublin was erected on the site of the Pillar in 2003.

The Hibernia statue was depicted on the obverse of a commemorative 2 euro coin marking the Centenary of the Easter Rising in 2016.

The postal service An Post moved its headquarters from the General Post Office building to new premises at North Wall Quay in Dublin, in June 2023.

== Images ==
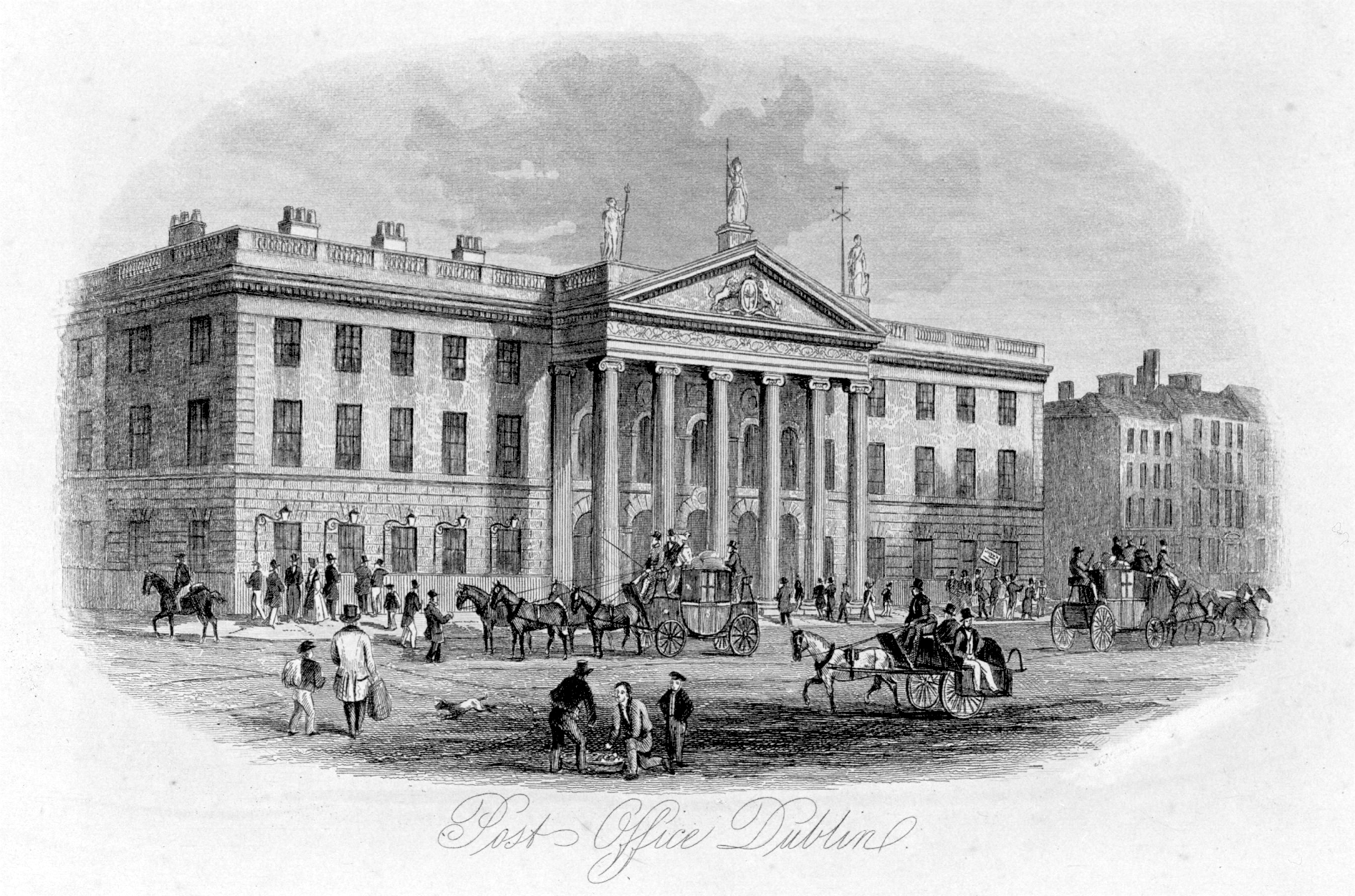
The General Post Office c. 1830

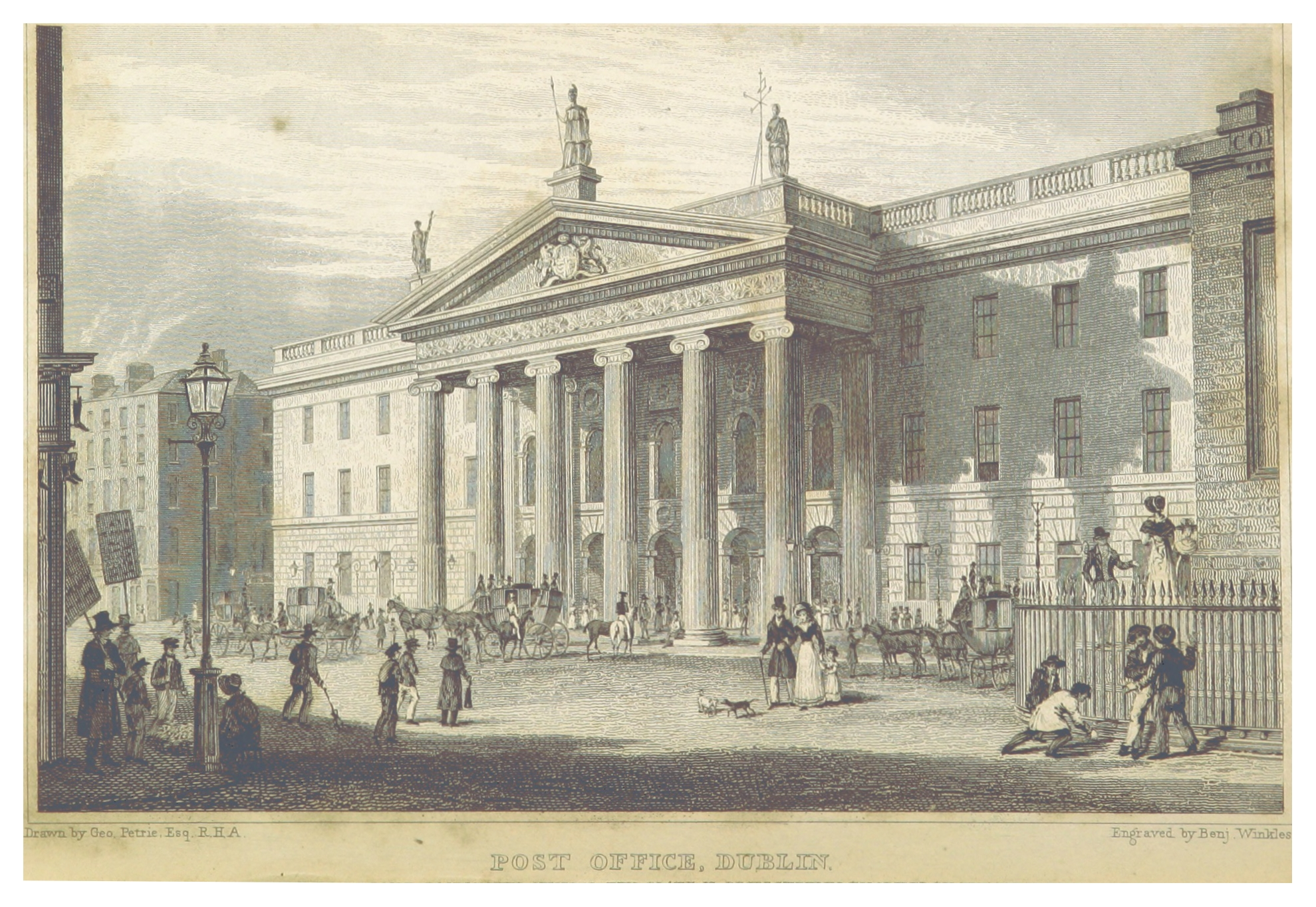
The GPO in an engraving from about 1831

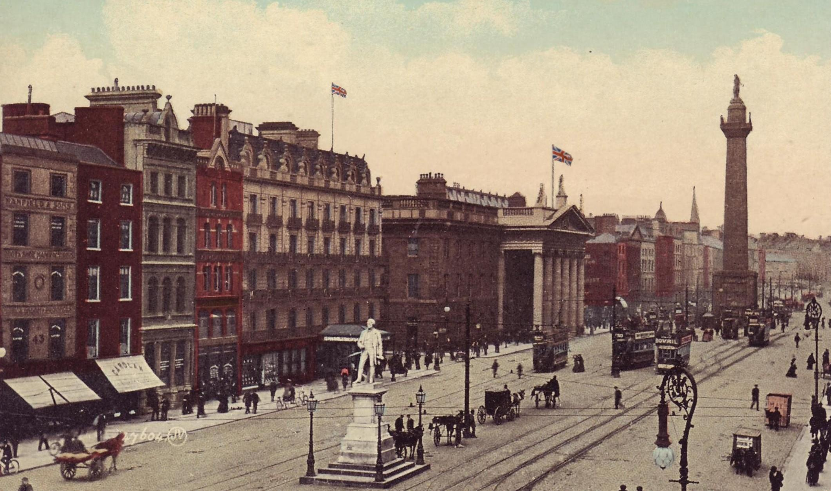
Before independence with a British flag flying. The adjacent Hotel Metropole was destroyed in 1916 during the Easter Rising.

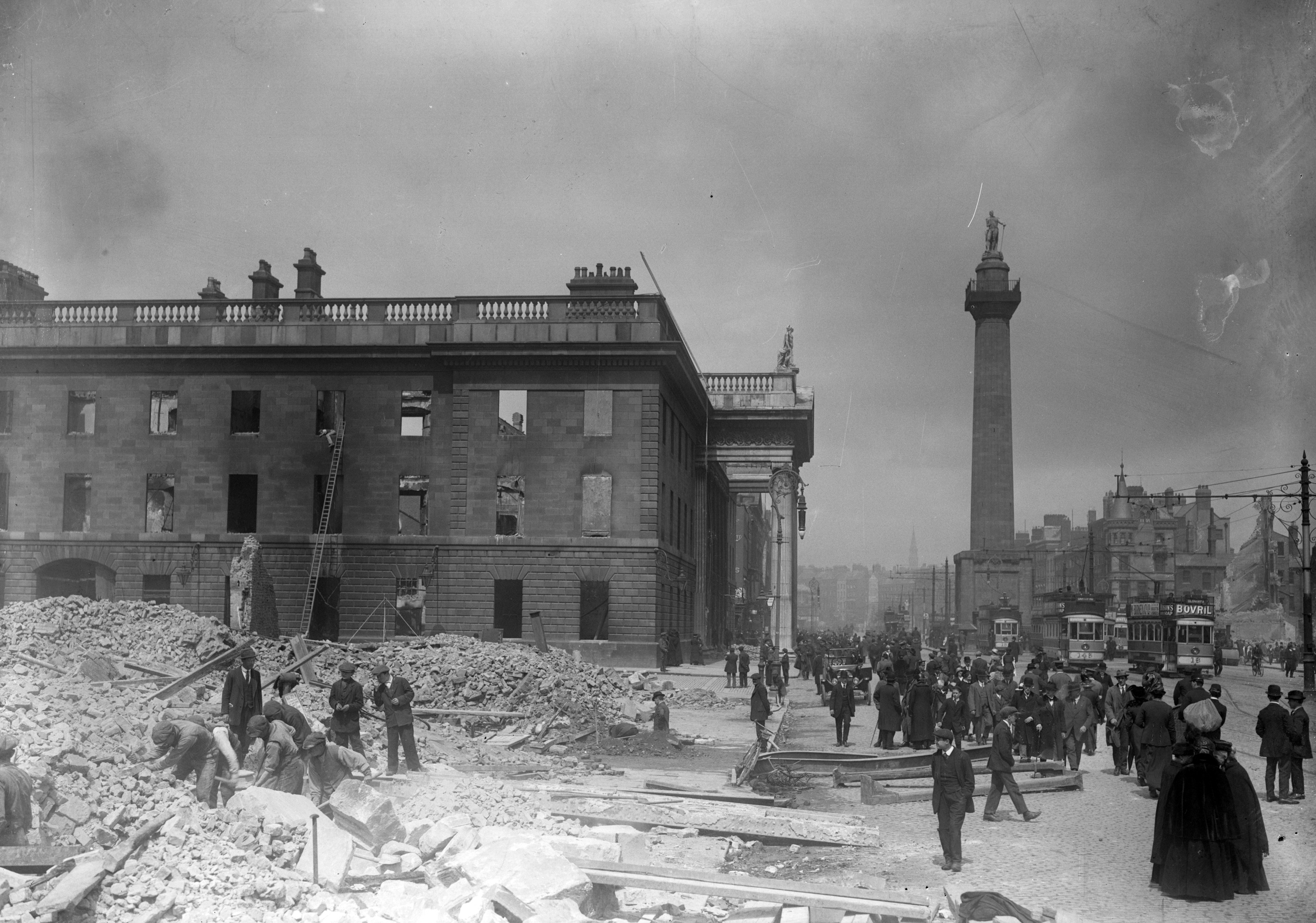
The shell of the GPO after the Rising; Nelson's Pillar can be seen on the right.

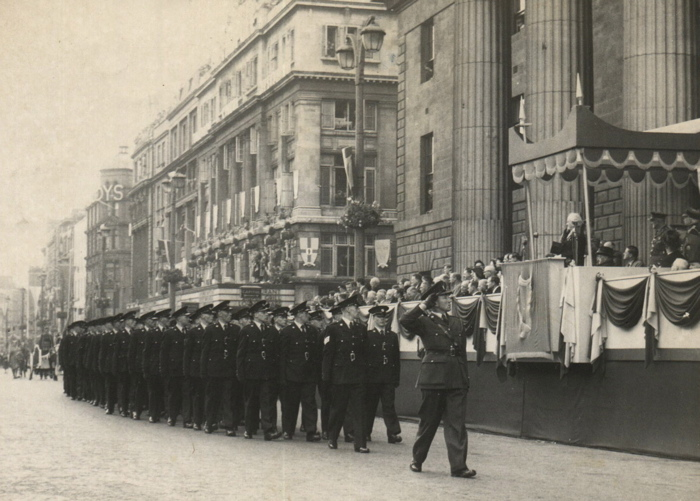
New Garda recruits march past the GPO, Tóstal 1954.

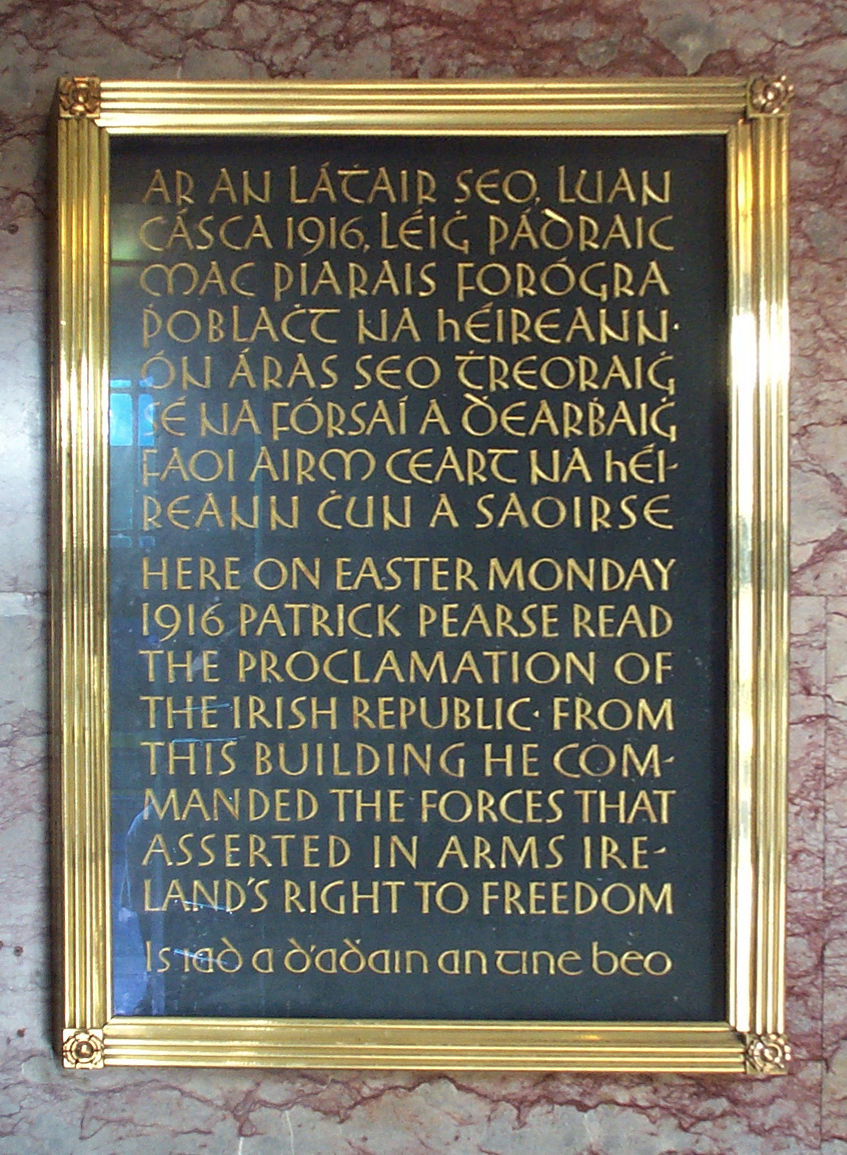
A plaque commemorating the Easter Rising at the GPO

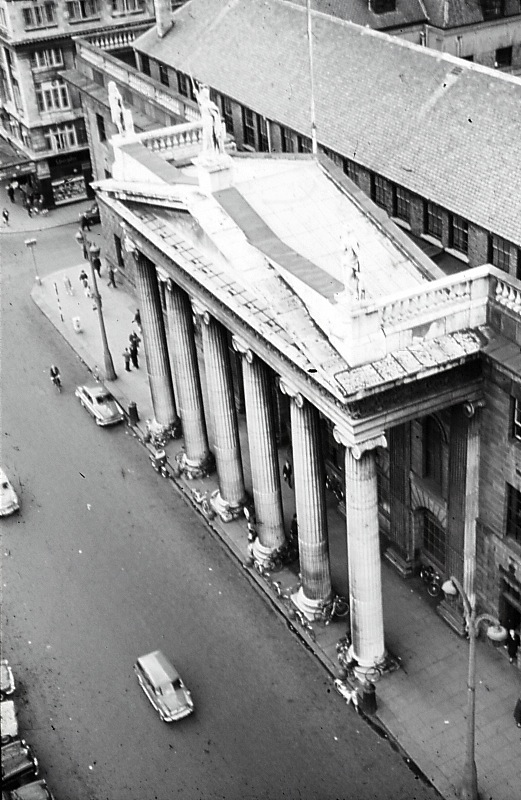
1964 view from Nelson's Pillar

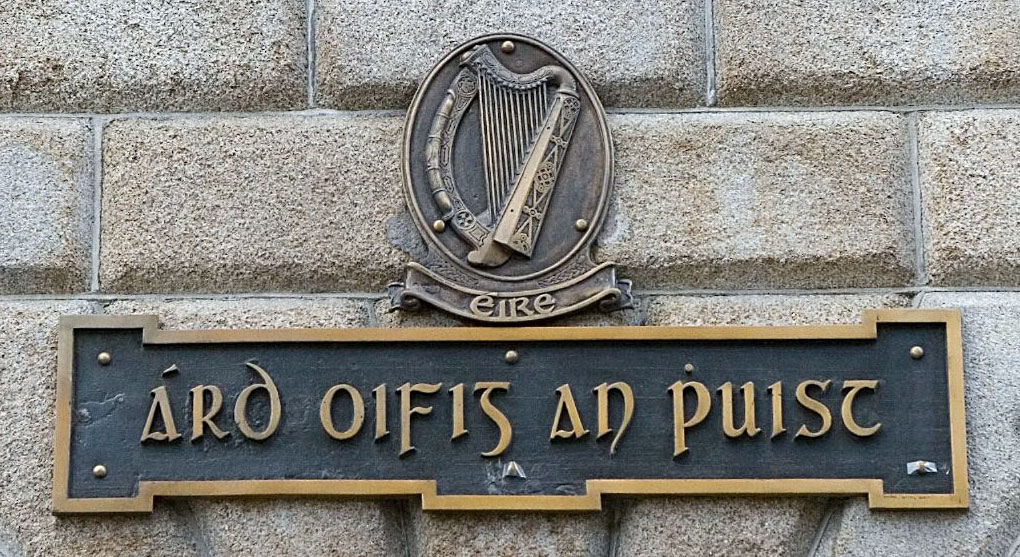
A sign on the external wall of the General Post Office, with the building's name (Irish: Árd Oifig an Phuist) in traditional Gaelic script and using an older spelling that predates Irish orthography reforms of the 1960s

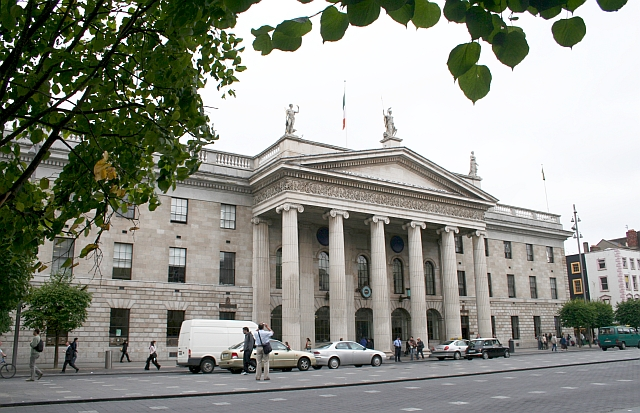
The General Post Office in 2006
