= Gifford sisters =

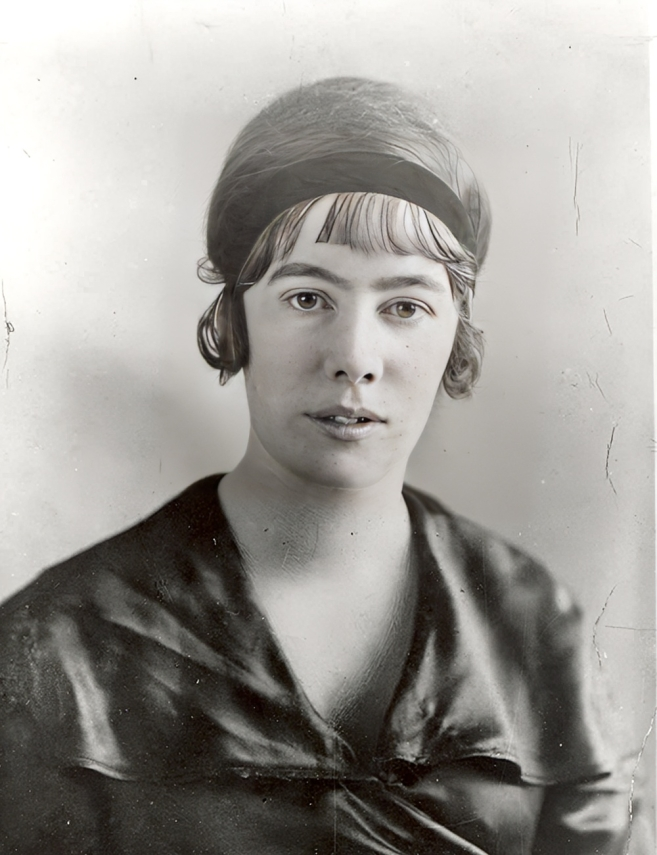
Nellie

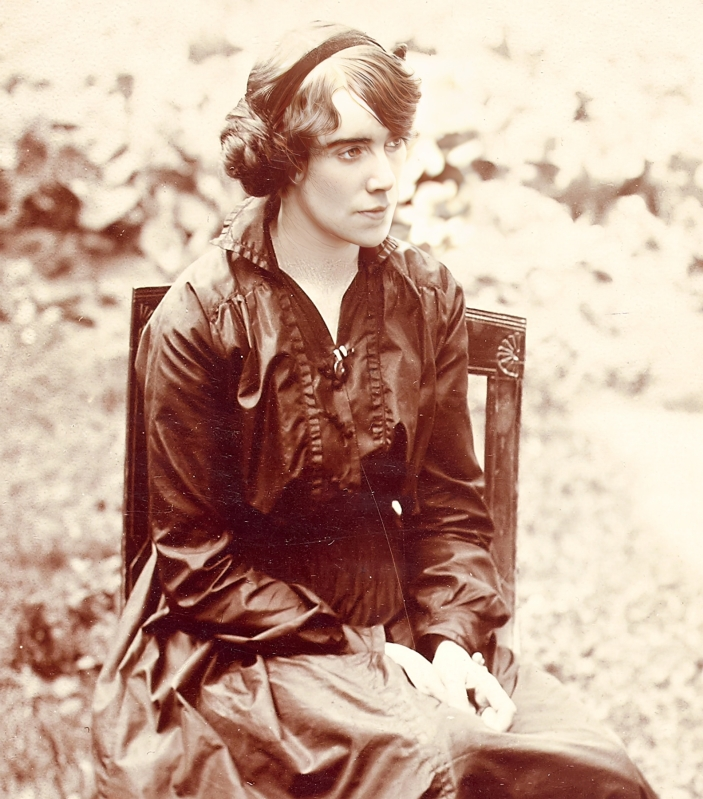
Muriel

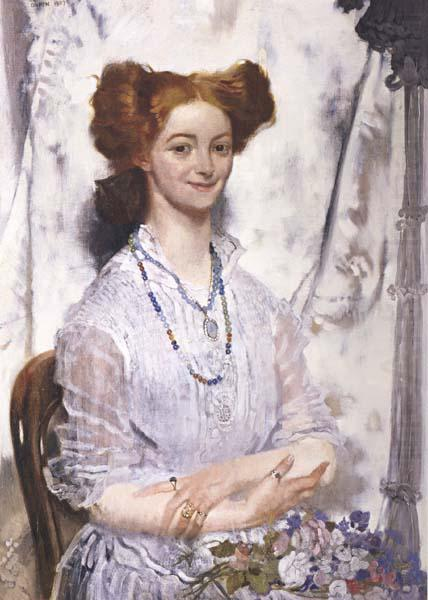
Grace

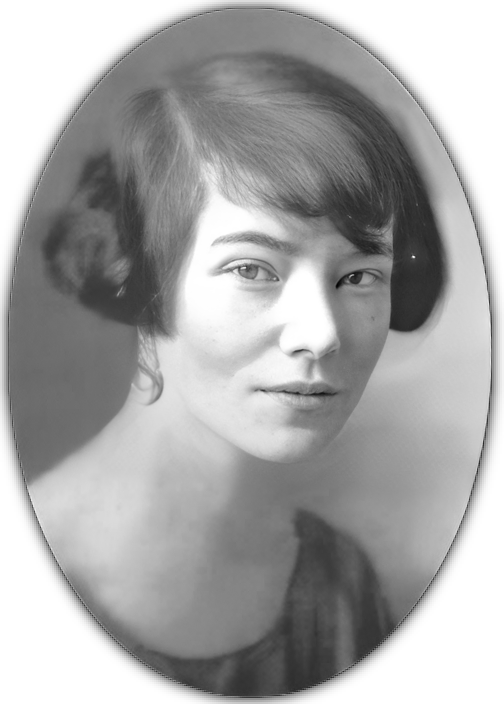
Sidney

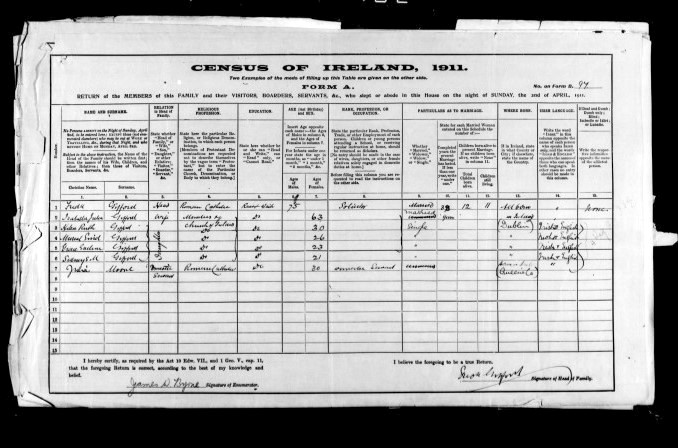
Gifford Household 1911 Census Form

The Gifford sisters were, save for one (Ada), prominent republicans during the Irish revolutionary period who were daughters of Frederick and Isabella Gifford, middle-class Dublin unionists. Two were married to signatories of the 1916 Proclamation.

== Family background ==
Frederick Gifford (1835/36–1917), a Catholic solicitor, married Isabella Julia Burton (1847/48–1932), daughter of a rector in the Church of Ireland, on 27 April 1872, in St. George's Church of Ireland church in Dublin. Isabella's father, Robert Nathaniel Burton, died in her infancy, after which she and her siblings were raised by their uncle, the painter Frederic William Burton. From the 1880s, the Giffords lived on Palmerston Road in Rathmines. After a first child who died in infancy, there were six daughters and six sons. The sons (Claude Frederick, Liebert, Gerald Vere, Gabriel Paul, Frederick Ernest, and Edward Cecil), though nominally baptised as Catholics (their father's religion), remained unionist and pursued unspectacular careers outside Ireland.

The girls were educated at Alexandra College. The children were raised as Protestants, though in adulthood four sisters converted to Catholicism (Katie, Muriel, Grace, and Sidney, all having married Catholics). All the sisters, except for one (Ada), were prominent republicans.

== Sisters ==
| Name | Born | Died | Married | Notes |
|---|---|---|---|---|
| Katherine Anna (Katie) | 28 February 1875 | 20 September 1957 | Walter Harris Wilson (1909) | Lived in Wales until her husband's death in 1918 during the 'flu epidemic. Civil servant in the Irish Republic and Irish Free State, later worked for the Irish White Cross, and as a French teacher. |
| Helen Ruth (Nellie) | 9 November 1880 | 23 June 1971 | Joseph Donnelly (1918) | Socialist active in the Dublin lockout and the Irish Citizen Army. Took part in the 1916 Easter Rising as Madame Markievicz' aide de camp in Stephen's Green and the Royal College of Surgeons. Was jailed after the Rising but on release went to the United States until after the Civil War had ended when she returned to Ireland. |
| Ada Gertrude | 14 February 1882 | c.1953 | | Artist, emigrated to the United States. May have married a man named Constant. |
| Muriel Enid | 18 December 1884 | 9 July 1917 | Thomas MacDonagh (3 May 1916) | Trained as a nurse. Mother of Donagh MacDonagh and Barbara (Bairbre) Redmond (née MacDonagh). Died while swimming at Skerries, County Dublin, where she was swept out to sea and died of heart failure brought on by exhaustion. |
| Grace Evelyn | 4 March 1888 | 13 December 1955 | Joseph Mary Plunkett (4 May 1916) | Artist and cartoonist. Married Plunkett hours before his execution after the Easter Rising. |
| Sidney (or Sydney) Sarah Madge | 3 August 1889 | 15 September 1974 | Árpád Czira (c. 1916) | Journalist under the pseudonym John Brennan. Later a broadcaster with Radio Éireann. |
