= Monica Sheridan =

Irish television chef (1912–1993)

- Born: Monica Elizabeth Treanor; 29 January 1912; Augher Castle, County Tyrone
- Died: 22 April 1993 (aged 81); Ashcroft nursing home, Navan, County Meath
- Resting place: Glasnevin Cemetery, Dublin
- Occupation: Chef
- Employer: Telefís Éireann
- Spouse: Niall Sheridan

Monica Sheridan (29 January 1912 – 22 April 1993) was an Irish cookery expert, award-winning broadcaster, author, and journalist, and Ireland's first celebrity chef.

== Early life and family ==
Monica Sheridan was born Monica Elizabeth Treanor at Augher Castle, County Tyrone on 29 January 1912. Her parents were Hugh Treanor and Mary Ann (née Devine). Her father was a successful cattle and sheep farmer. She had six sisters, Kathleen, Agnes, Dympna, Eva, Eileen, and Mannix, and six brothers, Hugh, Gerald, Maurice, William, George, and Walter.

She spent a great deal of her time with her centenarian maternal great-grandmother, from whom she learnt cooking and other domestic skills. Her great-grandmother lived in a traditional thatched cottage, and also passed on south Ulster folk traditions to Sheridan. Sheridan's mother and aunts were all expert cooks, often baking and preserving fruit. Sheridan attended convent schools with her sisters, but by her own admission, she was a poor student. She graduated from University College Dublin with a BA in French and English.

She married fellow graduate, Niall Sheridan, in May 1939. He worked with the Irish Tourist Board as an international publicity officer, as well as a published poet with a wide literary circle including Brian O'Nolan, Cyril Cusack, and Donagh MacDonagh with whom the Sheridans were close friends. The couple had one daughter, Catherine (born 1940). They lived until the mid-1970s at 7 de Vesci Terrace, Monkstown, Dublin, then moving to Park House, Ratoath, County Meath. Sheridan died in Ashcroft nursing home, Navan on 22 April 1993 after a long illness. She is buried in Glasnevin Cemetery in Dublin.

== Career ==
As Ireland's first television chef, Sheridan presented a live cookery series, Monica's Kitchen, from 1962 when Telefís Éireann began broadcasting as Ireland's national television service. The set was designed by Bill McCrow, a Canadian architect. Even though television broadcasting was in black and white, the studio was decorated in fashionable duck-egg blue and pink, in which she demonstrated new kitchen products. She was noted for the unselfconsciously familiar and comfortable manner, engaging audiences of all types. She had a subversive disregard for the rules of cookery and how upper management of Telefís Éireann could regard her irreverent sense of humour and unpredictable asides. She famously licked her fingers in the kitchen, horrifying traditionalists and endeared younger audiences. The meals she prepared would be given to the cameramen and studio technicians. Always known by Monica on-screen, she featured on other programmes, credited with introducing 1960s Ireland to new foods such as quiche, pizza and pasta. It has been suggested that the first mention of pizza was by Sheridan in The Irish Times in April 1956.

In 1963, she won the Jacob's television award for "putting personality into cooking". She continued on television until 1965, when she was dropped in favour for Home for Tea, the successor programme to Monica's Kitchen. She was dismissed after she appeared in a television advertisement promoting Irish bacon products for the Pigs and Bacon Commission, the appearance being unauthorised by Telefís Éireann. Sheridan was outspoken about what she believed as a nationally important food campaign, and the subsequent controversy resulted in her being reinstated on television quickly. Many sources claim that it was Sheridan's habit of licking her fingers that led to her dismissal.

Sheridan wrote for numerous publications including Creation and Gourmet and The Irish Times. She published cookery books which became classics: Monica's Kitchen (1963), The Art of Irish Cooking (1964), and My Irish Cookbook (1965). They had the same humorous and informal style as her television programmes. She cited Kevin Danaher's In Ireland Long Ago (1962) as an influence on her books, as she recalled growing up in rural County Tyrone without sentimentality.
