= Liam Redmond =

Irish actor (1913–1989)

- Born: 27 July 1913; Limerick, County Limerick, Ireland
- Died: 28 October 1989 (aged 76); Dublin, County Dublin, Ireland
- Education: University College Dublin
- Occupation: Actor
- Years active: 1935–1970s
- Spouse: Barbara MacDonagh (m. 1936; died 1987)
- Children: 4
- Relatives: Thomas MacDonagh (father-in-law)

Liam Redmond (27 July 1913 – 28 October 1989) was an Irish actor of stage, film and television.

== Early life and education ==
Redmond was one of four children born to cabinet-maker Thomas and Eileen Redmond. Educated at the Christian Brothers schools in Dublin, he later attended University College, Dublin and initially read medicine before moving into drama. While Director of the Dramatic Society he met and married the society's secretary Barbara MacDonagh (sister of Donagh MacDonagh and daughter of 1916 Rising leader Thomas MacDonagh and Muriel Gifford).

== Career ==
=== Theatre ===
Redmond was invited to join the Abbey Theatre in 1935 as a producer by William Butler Yeats, the Irish poet. Yeats wrote his play Death of Cuchullain for Redmond to star as Cúchullain, hero of one of Ireland's foundational myths.

Redmond made his acting debut at the Abbey Theatre in 1935 in Seán O'Casey's The Silver Tassie. His first American stage appearance was in 1939 in New York City in The White Steed. After returning to Britain at the outbreak of the Second World War he was a regular on the London stage. He made his West End debut Paul Vincent Carroll's 1939 The White Steed at the Trafalgar Theatre. In 1975, he starred as Flaherty in The Playboy of the Western World at the Royal National Theatre.

He also starred on Broadway, among other plays starring in The White Steed; in 1955 playing Canon McCooey in The Wayward Saint winning the George Jean Nathan Award for his performance, and in 1968 starring in Joe Orton's Loot and Brian Friel's The Loves of Cass Maguire.

=== Film and television ===
Redmond worked in TV and film throughout the 1950s to the 1980s and was regularly seen in TV series such as The Avengers, Daniel Boone, The Saint and Z-Cars. He was often called upon as a character actor in various military, religious and judicial roles in films such as I See a Dark Stranger (1946), Captain Boycott (1947), High Treason (1951), The Cruel Sea (1953), Playboy of the Western World (1962), Kid Galahad (1962), The Luck of Ginger Coffey (1964), Tobruk (1967), and The Ghost and Mr. Chicken (1966). His performance as the kindly occult expert in the cult horror film Night of the Demon (1957) is a favourite of fans of the film.

His last film role was as Mr. Brady in Stanley Kubrick's historical epic Barry Lyndon (1975).

=== Advocacy ===
Redmond was one of the founders of WAAMA, the Writers', Artists', Actors' and Musicians' Association, a precursor of Irish Actors' Equity. His insistence that "part-time professionals" – usually civil servants who acted on the side – should be paid a higher rate than professional actors for both rehearsal time and performance, effectively wiped out this class, raising the wages and fees of working actors.

== Personal life ==
Redmond had four children with his wife Barbara MacDonagh.

=== Death ===
Redmond died in Dublin, aged 76, after a long period of ill health, in 1989. His wife Barbara predeceased him in 1987.

== Selected filmography ==
- I See a Dark Stranger (1946) – Uncle Timothy
- Captain Boycott (1947) – Martin Egan
- Daughter of Darkness (1948) – Father Cocoran
- Saints and Sinners (1949) – O'Driscoll
- Sword in the Desert (1949) – Jerry McCarthy
- The Twenty Questions Murder Mystery (1950) – Echo News editor
- High Treason (1951) – Cmdr. Robert Brennan
- The Gentle Gunman (1952) – Connolly
- The Cruel Sea (1953) – Watts
- Devil on Horseback (1954) – Scarlett O'Hara
- Happy Ever After (1954) – Regan
- Final Appointment (1954) – Inspector Corcoran
- The Passing Stranger (1954) – Barnes
- The Divided Heart (1954) – First Justice
- The Glass Cage (1955) – Inspector Lindley
- 23 Paces to Baker Street (1956) – Joe
- Jacqueline (1956) – Mr. Lord
- Yield to the Night (1956) – Prison Doctor
- Safari (1956) – Roy Shaw
- The Long Haul (1957) – Casey
- Night of the Demon (1957) – Mark O'Brien
- Rooney (1958) – Mr. Doolan
- The Diplomatic Corpse (1958) – Inspector Corcoran
- She Didn't Say No! (1958) – Dr. Cassidy
- Ice Cold in Alex (1958) – Brigadier (D.D.M.S.)
- No Trees in the Street (1959) – Bill
- Alive and Kicking (1959) – Old Man
- The Boy and the Bridge (1959) – Pat Doyle
- Scent of Mystery (1960) – Johnny Gin
- Under Ten Flags (1960) – Windsor
- The Valiant (1962) – Surgeon Commander Reilly
- The Phantom of the Opera (1962) – Police Insp. Ward (uncredited)
- Kid Galahad (1962) – Father Higgins
- Playboy of the Western World (1963) – Michael James
- The Luck of Ginger Coffey (1964) – MacGregor
- The Amorous Adventures of Moll Flanders (1965) – Convict Ship Captain
- The Ghost and Mr. Chicken (1966) – Kelsey
- Tobruk (1967) – Henry Portman
- The 25th Hour (1967) – Father Koruga
- The Adventures of Bullwhip Griffin (1967) – Capt. Swain
- The Last Safari (1967) – Alec Beaumont
- Till Death Us Do Part (1968) – Mike's Father
- David Copperfield (1970, TV Movie) – Mr. Quinion
- Philadelphia, Here I Come (1974) – Senator Doogan
- Barry Lyndon (1975) – Mr. Brady
