= Sidney Czira =

Irish journalist and revolutionary (1889–1974)

Sidney Czira (née Gifford)
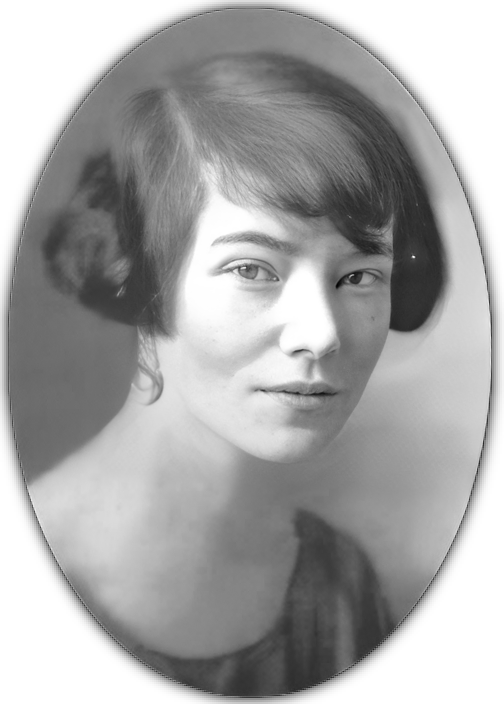
- Born: Sidney Gifford; 3 August 1889; Rathmines, Dublin, Ireland
- Died: 15 September 1974 (aged 85); Dublin, Ireland
- Other name: John Brennan
- Occupations: Journalist, broadcaster and writer
- Relatives: 11 siblings, including: Grace Gifford; Muriel Gifford; Nellie Gifford

Sidney Sarah Madge Czira (née Gifford; 3 August 1889 – 15 September 1974), known by her pen name John Brennan, was an Irish journalist, broadcaster, writer and revolutionary. She was an active member of the revolutionary group Inghinidhe na hÉireann (Daughters of Ireland) and wrote articles for its newspaper, Bean na h-Éireann, and for Arthur Griffith's newspaper Sinn Féin.

== Early life ==
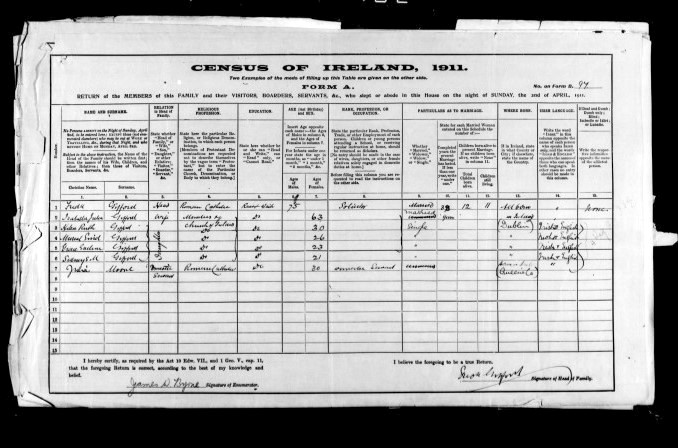
Gifford Household 1911 Census Form

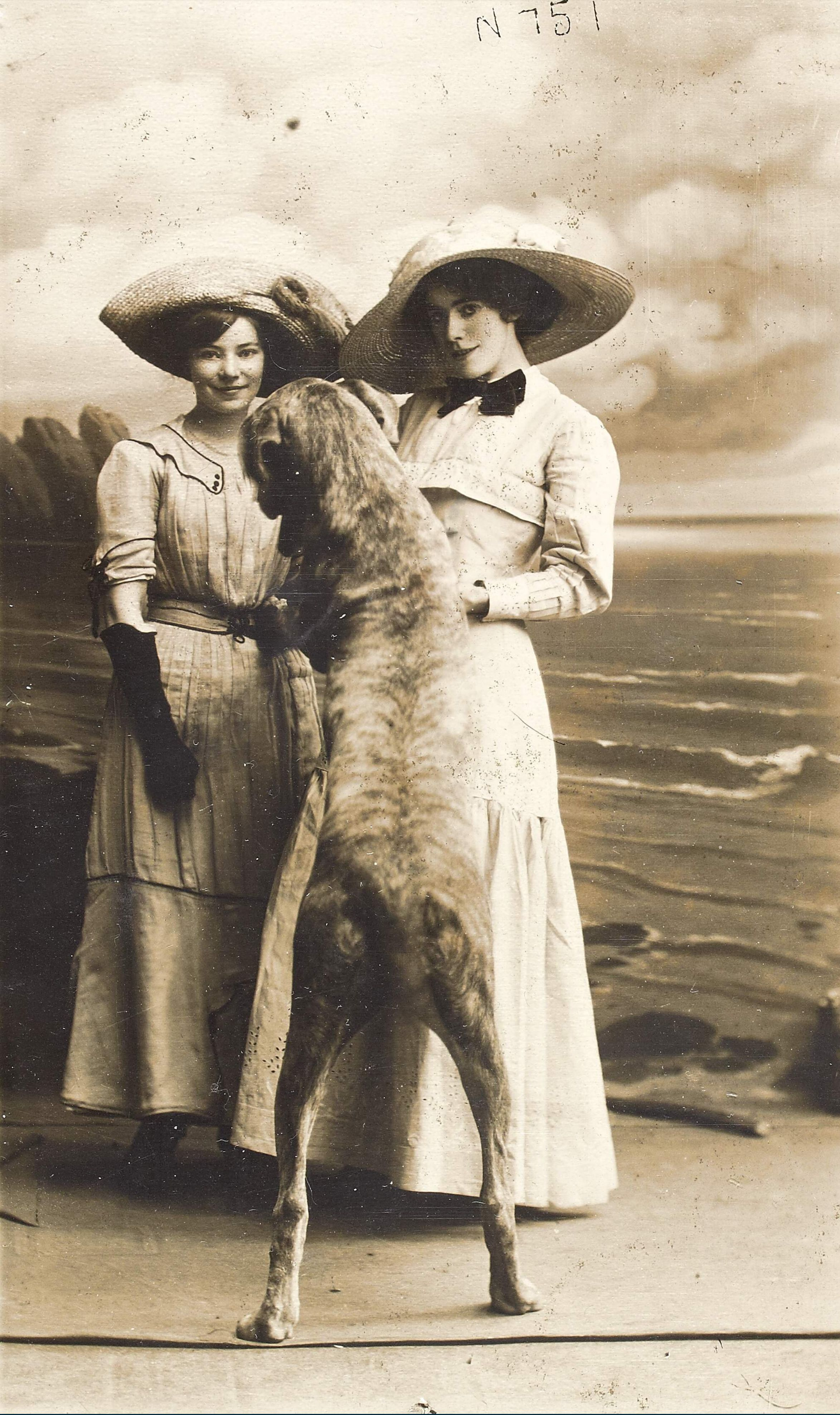
Muriel (left) and Sidney (right) Gifford in 1911

Gifford was born on 3 August 1889, the youngest of 12 children of Frederick and Isabella Gifford. Isabella Gifford (née Burton), was a niece of the artist Frederic William Burton, and was raised with her siblings in his household after the death of her father, Robert Nathaniel Burton, a rector, during the Famine.

Gifford's parents—her father was Catholic and her mother Anglican—were married in St George's, a Church of Ireland church on the north side of Dublin city, on 27 April 1872. She grew up in Rathmines, Dublin. She was raised as a Protestant, as were her siblings.

Like her sisters, the socialist Nellie Gifford, Grace Gifford, who married Joseph Plunkett and Muriel Gifford who married Thomas MacDonagh, she became interested and involved in the suffrage movement and the burgeoning Irish revolution.

== Education ==
Gifford was educated in Alexandra College in Earlsfort Terrace. After leaving school she studied music at the Leinster House School of Music. It was her music teacher, in her teens, who first gave her her first national Irish newspaper "The Leader". She began reading this secretly and then started reading Arthur Griffith's newspaper Sinn Féin.

== Career ==
Gifford was a member of Inghinidhe na hÉireann, a women's political organisation active from the 1900s. It was founded by Maud Gonne and a group of working-class and middle-class women to promote Irish culture and help to alleviate the shocking poverty of Dublin and other cities at a time when Dublin's slums were unfavourably compared with Calcutta's. Gifford, who was already writing under the name "John Brennan" for Sinn Féin, was asked to write for its newspaper Bean na h-Éireann. Her articles varied from those highlighting poor treatment of women in the workplace to fashion and gardening columns, some written under the pseudonym Sorcha Ní hAnlúan.

She also worked, along with her sisters, in Maud Gonne's and Constance Markievicz's dinner system in St Audoen's Church, providing good solid dinners for children in three Dublin schools – poor Dublin schoolchildren then often arrived to school without breakfast, went without a meal for the day, and if their father had been given his dinner when they arrived home, might not eat or might only have a crust of bread that night.

In 1911 she was elected (as John Brennan) to the executive of the political group Sinn Féin.

Gifford was a member of Cumann na mBan (The Irish Women's Council) from its foundation in Dublin on 2 April 1914. Its members learned first aid, drilling and signalling and rifle shooting, and served as an unofficial messenger and backup service for the Irish Volunteers. During the fight for Irish Independence the women carried messages, stored and delivered guns and ran safe houses where men on the run could eat, sleep and pick up supplies.

== United States ==
In 1914 Gifford moved to America to work as a journalist. Through her connection with Padraic Colum and Mary Colum, whom she had met through her brother-in-law Thomas MacDonagh, she met influential Irish-Americans such as Thomas Addis Emmet and Irish exiles like John Devoy, with whom she did not get on.

She wrote both for traditional American newspapers and for Devoy's Gaelic American newspaper. She and her sister Nellie Gifford founded the American branch of Cumann na mBan, and she acted as its secretary. Both sisters toured and spoke about the Easter Rising and those involved. She was an active campaigner for Irish independence and against the United States joining the war against Germany, seen as a war for profit and expansion of the British Empire, and so to the disadvantage of the work for Irish independence. She helped Nora Connolly O'Brien to contact German diplomats in the US. In 1920 she secured work writing for Joseph McGarrity’s Irish Press in Philadelphia. McGarrity had taken the anti-Treaty side in the Civil War while Devoy had supported the Treaty.

In New York she met Árpád Czira, a soldier in the Austro-Hungarian Army who had escaped from a Siberian prison. Their son Finian was born in New York in 1917 by which time Czira had already returned to Hungary. It is uncertain whether Czira and Gifford were married but Gifford took Czira's name and returned with her son to Ireland in 1922, using a fake passport, to live with her mother in the family home at Cambridge Road, Rathmines. Czira married in Romania in 1926.

== Civil War ==
As a member of the Women's Prisoners' Defence League she was an activist against the ill-treatment of Republican prisoners during the Civil War. On her return to Ireland she continued to work as a journalist, becoming one of the early broadcasters at the new national radio station, 2RN, though she was stymied in her work, as were the women of her family and many of those who had taken the anti-Free State side. In the 1950s her memoirs were published in The Irish Times, and she moved into work as a broadcaster and produced a series of historical programmes.

Sidney Gifford Czira died in Dublin on 15 September 1974 and is buried in Deans Grange Cemetery.

== Publications ==
- The Years Flew By: Recollections of Sidney Gifford Czira - John Brennan (1974)
