= Nellie Gifford =

Irish republican activist and nationalist (1880–1971)

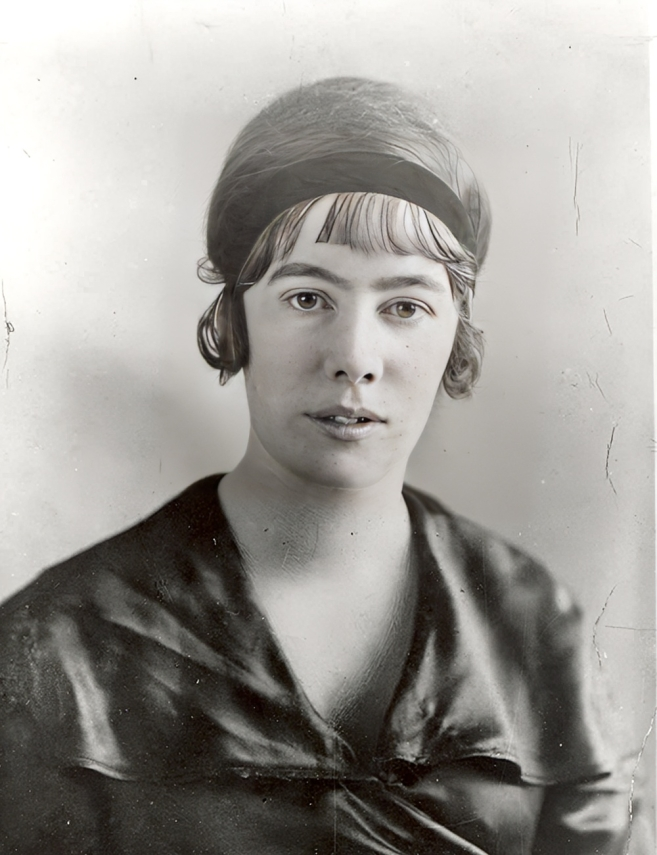
- Gifford in 1917
- Born: Helen Ruth Gifford; 9 November 1880; Phibsborough, Dublin, Ireland
- Died: 23 June 1971 (aged 90); Dublin, Ireland
- Other name: Nellie Donnelly
- Relatives: 11 siblings, including: Grace Gifford; Sidney Gifford; Muriel Gifford

Nellie Gifford (9 November 1880 – 23 June 1971) was an Irish republican activist and nationalist.

== Early life ==
Nellie at age 16

Born Helen Ruth Gifford on 9 November 1880 in Phibsborough, Dublin to Frederick Gifford (1835/6–1917), a solicitor, and Isabella Julia Gifford (née Burton; 1847/8–1932), she was the fifth child and second eldest daughter of the family of six daughters and six sons. Her father was a Catholic while her mother, a niece of the painter Frederick Burton, was rigorously Protestant. All the children were brought up in the Church of Ireland. The men, emigrated and remained unionist while the women were active nationalists. Most famous were the two youngest, the artist Grace Gifford, and the journalist and broadcaster Sydney Czira.

Gifford grew up in Rathmines and went to school at Alexandra College. She trained as a domestic economy teacher and worked for seven years at a series of positions in County Meath.

== Nationalism ==
Gifford experienced the living conditions of the landless rural poor while lodging in labourers' cottages during this time. As a result, she became a supporter of the campaigns of the land agitator and nationalist MP Laurence Ginnell.

She was also influenced by her sisters' nationalism and feminism. With them, she became involved with the Irish Women's Franchise League, and got to know Constance Markievicz. She got parts in stage plays, including Eleanor's Enterprise by George Birmingham in the Gaiety Theatre, a play produced by the countess's husband, Count Casimir Markievicz.

During the 1913 Dublin lock-out she assisted James Larkin enter the Imperial Hotel, on 31 August to address the crowd. He entered in disguise, that of an elderly and infirm clergyman. Gifford posed as his niece. She spoke to the hotel staff to prevent Larkin's strong Liverpool accent giving away his identify. This was the speech which precipitated the "Bloody Sunday" police baton charge. Gifford went on to be a founding member of the Irish Citizen Army (ICA). This group was attractive to many women due to the feminist beliefs of James Connolly.

She gave lessons on camp cookery in Liberty Hall and found jobs for recruits coming in from abroad. As a result of this work she, very fatefully, introduced Michael Collins to her future brother-in-law Joseph Plunkett who went on to serve together in the 1916 Easter Rising; Collins was Plunkett's aide-de-camp.

Gifford was the only one of her sisters to actively participate in the rising itself. She was with the ICA's St Stephen's Green contingent alongside Countess Markievicz. Throughout the week she supervised the garrison's provisions in the College of Surgeons' building, commandeering food from shops and bread vans, and by courier from other garrisons. She also ensured the delivery of provisions to troops both in the college with her and in outlying posts. Gifford was one of the women arrested at the surrender and jailed in Kilmainham Gaol. At the same time, in the same prison her sister Grace married Joseph Plunkett hours before his death. Only twelve women were detained after the main release women prisoners on 8 May 1916. Gifford was one of those transferred to Mountjoy Prison until her release on 4 June 1916. Afterwards she continued to be as involved in the campaigns.

After her time in prison, Gifford travelled through England to the US where she and other women veterans of Easter week lectured throughout America. While there she married Joseph Donnelly, of Omagh, County Tyrone in 1918. In 1921 she and their year-old daughter Maeve left him to return to Ireland.

== Later life ==
Frederick Gifford died in September 1917 and left her £800. However Gifford was not well off. She became a broadcaster and journalist for the national radio and the Irish press. Holding to her upbringing, Gifford remained a staunch Protestant, unlike four of her sisters, who had married Catholics.

She became devoted to preserving the historical record of the independence movement. Noticing the huge number of visitors for the 1932 Eucharistic Congress she organised a small exhibition there of 1916 memorabilia for the National Museum of Ireland. She was irritated by the display of Catholic religious artifacts there. She campaigned for a permanent exhibition of recent Irish nationalist history. Gifford coordinated a substantial body of material pertinent to nationalist organisations, the Easter Rising, and the war of independence, which now forms the core of the present collection.

Over the years Gifford was secretary of the Old IRA Association, a member of the Old Dublin Society, and a founder of the Kilmainham Gaol Restoration Society. She also looked after stray and neglected dogs and cats. She died on 23 June 1971 at the Gascoigne nursing home in Rathmines, Dublin, aged 90.
