= Niall Sheridan =

Irish artist (1912–1998)

Niall Sheridan (1912–1998) was an Irish poet, fiction-writer, and broadcaster, remembered primarily for his friendships with better-known Irish writers Brian O'Nolan (who published under the pseudonym Flann O'Brien) and Donagh MacDonagh.

== Academic life and early work ==
As a student at University College Dublin he cofounded the journal Blather with O'Nolan and his brother Ciaran O'Nolan. Sheridan was also the editor of the college literary magazine Comhthrom Feinne (Fair Play). Sheridan was one of the founders of the so-called "Cult of Joyce" at UCD, which also included O'Nolan, Denis Devlin, Donagh MacDonagh, and other latterly influential writers.

While a student, Sheridan shared a room with MacDonagh in Rathmines, in a house featuring a Great Dane named Thor and numerous visits from other aspirant writers, artists, and thinkers. The poet and left-wing agitator Charles Donnelly was a particularly frequent guest. Sheridan and MacDonagh published a book titled Twenty Poems (they contributed ten each), which Colm Ó Lochlainn printed in a limited edition of 300 copies in 1934.

== Relationship with Flann O'Brien ==
Sheridan remained close to O'Nolan, and the two conspired on provocations on the letters pages of the Irish Times. At the same time, with other UCD friends at Grogan's Pub in Dublin, they were making plans for a literary revolution in the form of a collaboratively written political novel (never completed) to be titled Children of Destiny. As the literary stature of some of his friends grew, and these early plans gave way to major accomplishments, Sheridan's formative role was remembered. He is represented closely by the character of Brinsley in O'Nolan's At Swim-Two-Birds, a highly literate fellow student of the narrator described as "an intellectual Meath-man; given to close-knit epigrammatic talk." Many details of Sheridan's life and work were incorporated into O'Nolan's novel, including his early translations of Catullus (featured in Twenty Poems). Following the book's publication, Sheridan brought it to James Joyce in Paris, though Joyce told him he had already read it.

In 1949, Sheridan and O'Nolan published, anonymously, an interview with John Stanislaus Joyce, James Joyce's father. The authenticity of this interview was later doubted, and it was chalked up as one of O'Nolan's many literary pranks. Nevertheless, Sheridan insisted to Joyce's biographer Richard Ellmann that the interview had happened, and the question remains unsettled.

== Later life and broadcasting ==
In 1939, Sheridan married Monica Treanor, a chef. Like Monica, Sheridan became a broadcaster, working on the show "Information Please" for Radio Éireann. In 1947, Sheridan's quiz show "What's the Word?" - in which Sheridan read out dictionary definitions and the teams guessed the term - aired Wednesdays on Radio Éireann. As his employer, now Raidió Teilifís Éireann, expanded into television, Sheridan contributed such works as a teleplay titled "A Dog's Life" and several productions about O'Nolan/O'Brien. Sheridan continued to be active in the literary world, often on behalf of the friends of his youth; in 1950, for example, he published an introduction to Devlin's "The Heavenly Foreigner" in Poetry Ireland, noting that "on careful reading, superficial obscurities vanish." Following MacDonagh's death in 1968, Sheridan wrote a preface for his poetry collection A Warning to Conquerors. He worked occasionally on his own pieces as well, and his play Seven Men and a Dog was performed by the Abbey Theatre in 1958.

== See also ==
- James Casey (poet-priest), who inspired another character in At Swim-Two-Birds
