= Bridie O'Mullane =

Irish republican (1895–1969/1970)

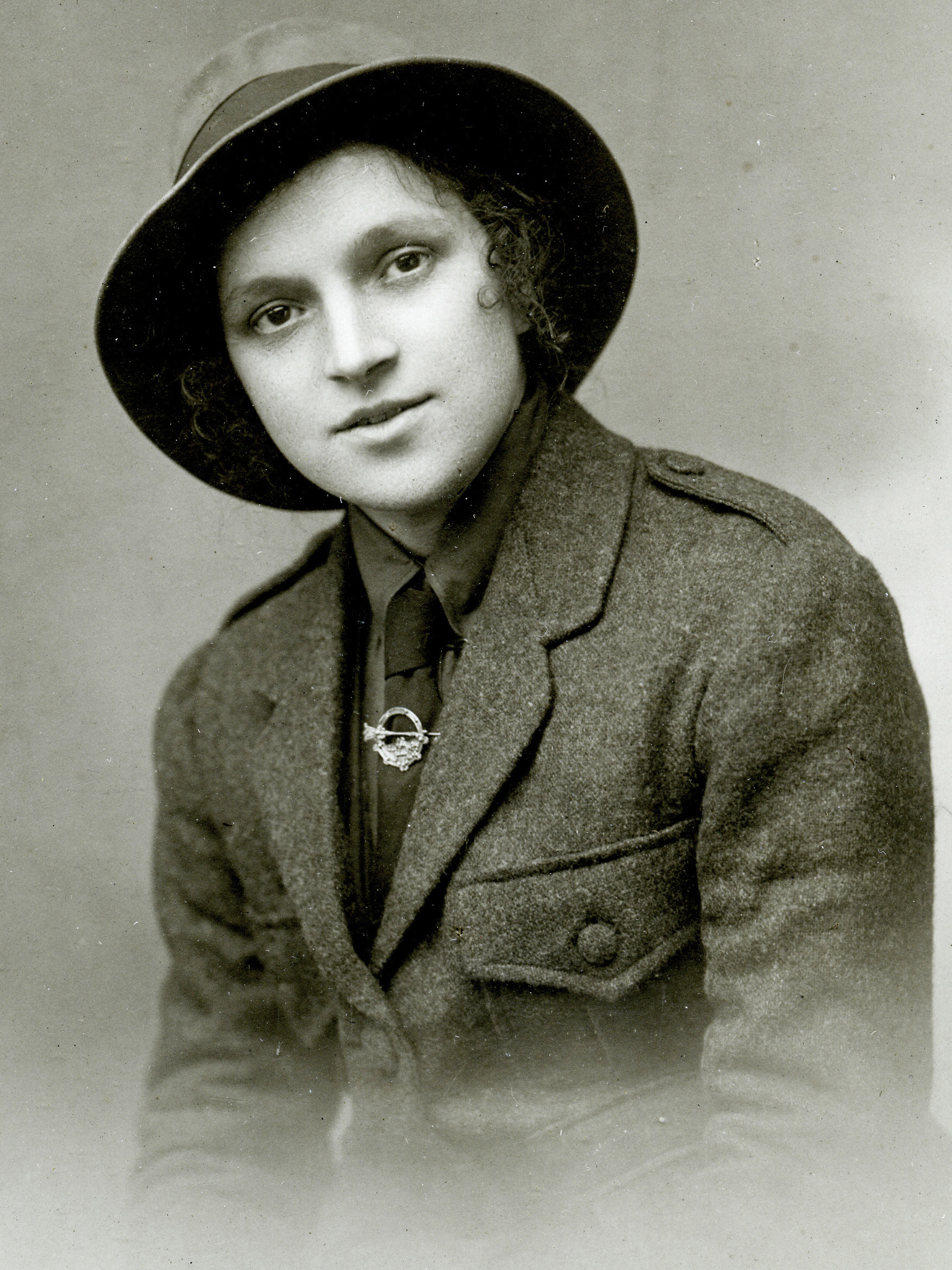
- O'Mullane in Cumann na mBan uniform, c. 1918
- Born: Bridget Josephine Mullane; 4 March 1895; Sligo, Ireland
- Died: 1969/1970 (aged 74)
- Buried: Glasnevin Cemetery
- Allegiance: Irish Republic
- Branch: Cumann na mBan
- Rank: Officer Commanding (Kilmainham Gaol); Director of Publicity and Propaganda (during Civil War)
- Conflicts: Irish War of Independence; Irish Civil War

Bridget Josephine O'Mullane (4 March 1895–1969/1970) was a senior member of Cumann na mBan during the Irish War of Independence, where she was a recruiting officer. During the Irish Civil War, she was director of publicity and propaganda.

== Biography ==
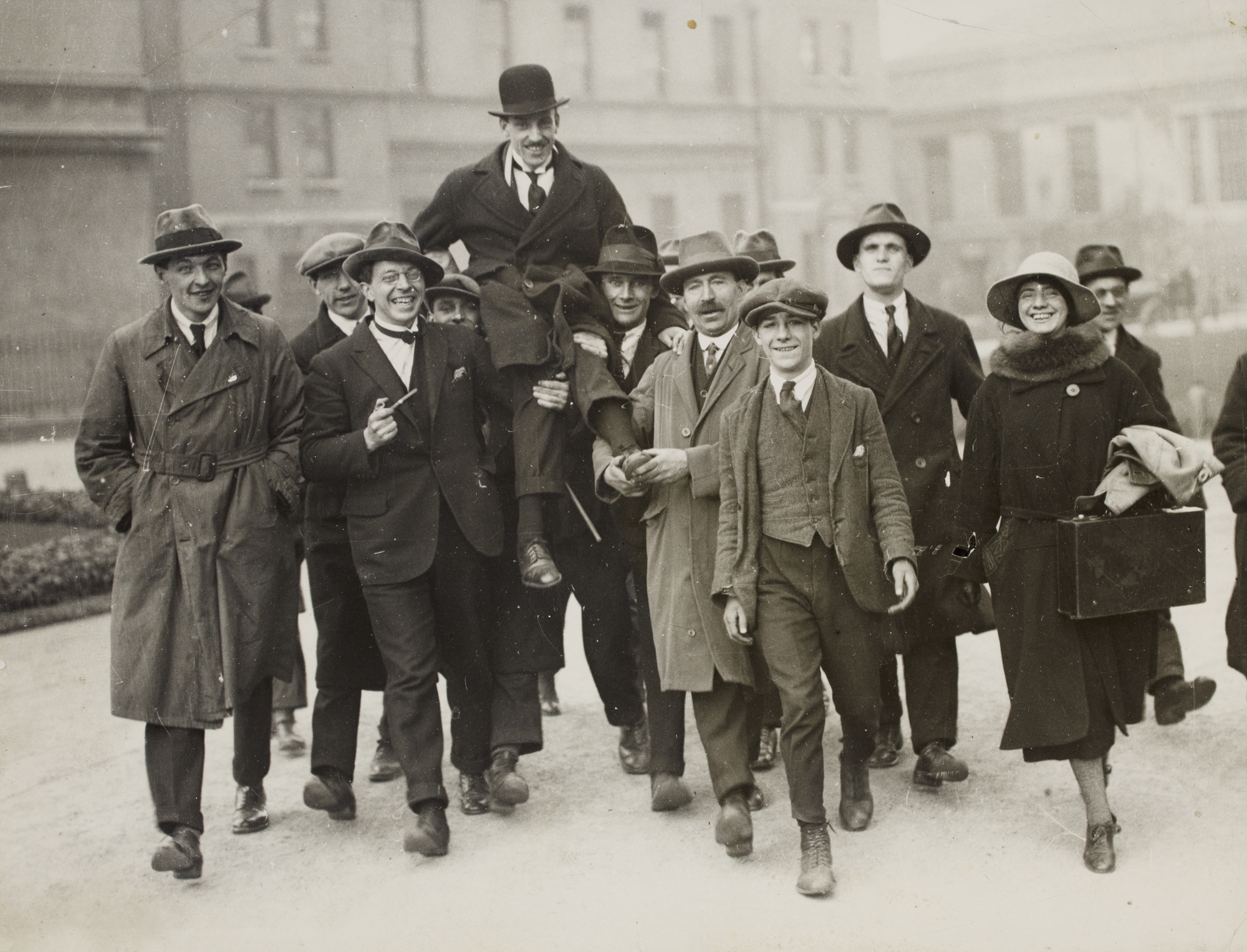
O'Mullane, seen on the right holding a briefcase, celebrates the election of Seán Lemass to the Dáil in 1924

O'Mullane was born on 4 March 1895 in Sligo to Bridget (née McCaffery) and James Mullane. Her father was a Royal Irish constable, while her mother ran a drapery shop in the town. Count Plunkett was visiting the town of Sligo in 1917 following his victory as Sinn Féin MP in the North Roscommon by-election and stayed with the Mullane family on Grattan Street. Countess Plunkett told O'Mullane about Cumann na mBan and how they were recruiting and needed a branch in Sligo. By 1918 O'Mullane was a member of the Executive of Cumann na mBan. She had founded branches in County Sligo and went on to work all over the country. During the Irish War of Independence O'Mullane moved around Ireland establishing and maintaining lines of communication between Dublin and Irish Republican Army units throughout Ireland. O'Mullane was responsible for maintaining communications with units in Counties Down, Londonderry, Kildare, Louth, Meath and Westmeath.

She was arrested on 3 November 1918 for selling flags without a permit, to raise funds for the organisation. She was also arrested when she was visiting her father in prison, for carrying seditious literature and later during the civil war, acting on the Anti-Treaty side O'Mullane was arrested and imprisoned in Kilmainham Gaol. Her cell was left decorated with graffiti, slogans and drawings that are still visible. She went on to be appointed Director of Publicity and Propaganda during the Irish Civil War.

During her time as a political prisoner in Kilmainham Gaol, O'Mullane was appointed Officer Commanding of the prisons A Wing. She conducted negotiations with the prison commander on their behalf. She was also reportedly assaulted by the police while in custody.

After the war, O'Mullane was a member of the Friends of Soviet Russia and took part in various conferences between workers. She died at age 74 and is buried in the Republican Plot in Glasnevin Cemetery.
