= Grace Gifford =

Irish artist (1888–1955)

Grace Evelyn Gifford Plunkett
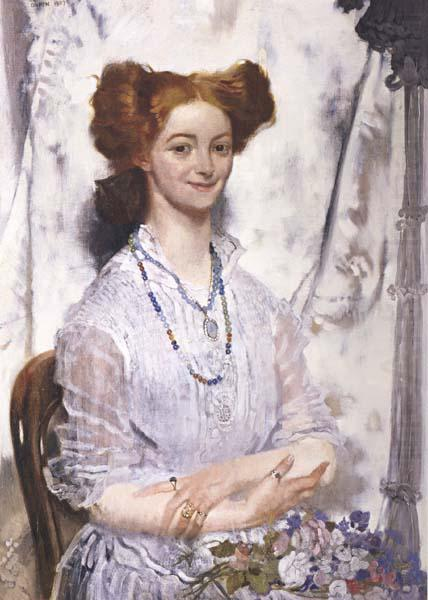
- Young Ireland: Grace Gifford by William Orpen, c. 1907
- Born: 4 March 1888; Rathmines, Dublin, Ireland
- Died: 13 December 1955 (aged 67); Portobello, Dublin, Ireland
- Occupation: Cartoonist
- Spouse: Joseph Plunkett (m. 1916; died 1916)
- Relatives: 11 siblings, including: Muriel Gifford; Sidney Gifford; Nellie Gifford

Grace Evelyn Gifford Plunkett (4 March 1888 – 13 December 1955) was an Irish artist and cartoonist who was active in the Republican movement, who married her fiancé Joseph Plunkett in Kilmainham Gaol only a few hours before he was executed for his part in the 1916 Easter Rising.

== Early life and education ==
Gifford's parents were Frederick Gifford, a solicitor and a Roman Catholic, and Isabella Julia Burton Gifford, a Protestant. They were married in St George's, a Church of Ireland church on the north side of Dublin. Grace was the second youngest in a family of 12 children and grew up in the fashionable suburb of Rathmines in Dublin. The boys were baptised as Catholics and the girls as Protestant, but effectively the children were all raised as Protestants – the girls attended Alexandra College in Earlsfort Terrace, and the boys attended the High School in Harcourt Street.

At the age of 16, Gifford went to the Dublin Metropolitan School of Art, where she studied under the Irish artist William Orpen. Orpen regarded Gifford as one of his most talented pupils. He often sketched her and eventually painted her as one of his subjects for a series on 'Young Ireland'. At around this time, Gifford's talent for caricature was discovered and developed. In 1907 she attended the course in Fine Art at the Slade School of Art, London.

== Career ==
Cartoon by Grace Gifford Plunkett from Dublin Opinion

Gifford returned to Dublin in 1908 and, with great difficulty, tried to earn a living as a caricaturist, publishing her cartoons in The Shanachie, Irish Life, Meadowstreet and The Irish Review, which was edited from 1913 by Joseph Plunkett. She considered emigrating but gave up the idea. Despite earning so little money, she enjoyed a lively social life; her friends included Nora Dryhurst, a journalist who worked in London, and George William Russell (Æ). During the same year, Mrs Dryhurst brought Gifford to the opening of the new bilingual school Scoil Éanna in Ranelagh, Dublin. It was here that she met Joseph Plunkett for the first time. He was a friend of her brother-in-law, another of the future leaders of the 1916 Easter Rising, Thomas MacDonagh, who was married to Gifford's sister Muriel.

== Engagement, Easter Rising and marriage ==
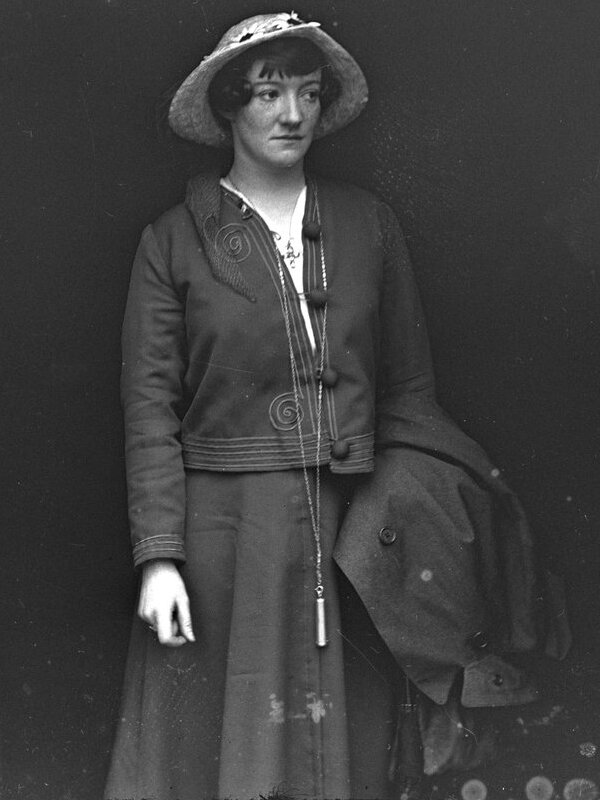
Gifford standing outside Kilmainham Jail on 2 May 1916

Grace Gifford's cell at Kilmainham

Gifford painted the Madonna and Child in her cell

Gifford's growing interest in the Roman Catholic religion led to the deepening of her relationship with Plunkett as she began to discuss Catholic mystical ideas with him – he was from an arch-Catholic family, his father a Papal count. Plunkett proposed to her in 1915; Gifford accepted and took formal instruction in Catholic doctrine. She was received into the Catholic Church in April 1916. The couple planned to marry on Easter Sunday that year, in a double wedding with his sister and her fiancé. Her parents were not in favour of her marrying Plunkett, due to the precarious state of his health – he was extremely ill at this time.

After the Rising, Gifford's brother-in-law Thomas MacDonagh was shot with PH Pearse and Thomas Clarke by firing squad on 3 May. That day, she heard that Plunkett was to be shot at dawn. She bought a ring in a jeweller's shop in Dublin city centre and, with the help of a priest, persuaded the military authorities to allow them to marry. Gifford and Plunkett were married on the night of 3 May in the chapel of Kilmainham Gaol, a few hours before he was executed.

== Sinn Féin ==
Grace Plunkett decided to devote herself through her art to the promotion of Sinn Féin policies and resumed her commercial work to earn a living. She was elected to the Sinn Féin executive in 1917.

Her sister Muriel, widow of executed 1916 leader Thomas MacDonagh, died of heart failure while swimming in 1917. Grace shared the care of Muriel's two children, Donagh MacDonagh and Barbara with their eldest sister, Katherine, until 1919. She was a loving aunt to both throughout her life.

== Civil War and aftermath ==
During the Civil War, Grace Plunkett was arrested with many others in February 1923 and interned at Kilmainham Gaol for three months. She painted pictures on the walls of her cell, including one of the Blessed Virgin and the Christ Child. The current picture of the Madonna displayed in her cell is a recreation of the original by Thomas Ryan RHA. She was released in May 1923.

When the Civil War ended, she had no home of her own and little money. Like many Anti-Treaty Republicans, Grace was the target of social ostracism and had difficulty finding work. Her talent as an artist was her only real asset; her cartoons were published in various newspapers and magazines, including Dublin Opinion, the Irish Tatler, Sketch, and on one occasion in 1934, Punch. She illustrated W. B. Yeats' The Words upon the Window Pane in 1930.

She moved from one rented apartment to another and ate in city centre restaurants. She befriended many people and had many admirers, but had no wish to remarry. Her material circumstances improved in 1932 when she received a Civil List pension from Éamon de Valera's Fianna Fáil government. This freed her from financial worries and enabled her to make the occasional trip to Paris where she delighted in visits to the galleries and exhibitions. She lived for many years in a flat in Nassau Street with a balcony overlooking the sports ground of Trinity College.

Grace's in-laws refused to honour her husband's will, in which he left everything to his widow, or his last letter to her in which he requested her to ensure that she pursue this - a heavy burden to place on Grace, who was not a mercenary person. Legally, the will was invalid because there was only one witness (the law requires two) and also the marriage took place after the will was made, automatically revoking it. For years Grace received nothing, so she began legal proceedings against her mother- and father-in-law, Count George Noble Plunkett and his wife in 1934. The Count and Countess Plunkett settled out of court. Grace was paid £700, plus costs.

At around this time, she joined the Old Dublin Society, where she met the noted Irish harpsichord maker Cathal Gannon. When Cathal married, Grace gave him and his wife Margaret a present of two single beds and a picture. From the late 1940s onwards, Grace's health declined. In 1950 she was brought to St Vincent's Hospital, then in the city centre. She convalesced in a nursing home, which she did not like, mainly because it restricted her freedom.

Grace Gifford Plunkett died suddenly on 13 December 1955 in her apartment in South Richmond Street, Portobello. Her body was removed to St Kevin's Church, Harrington Street and among the attendees at her funeral was President Seán T. O'Kelly. She was buried with full military honours close to the republican plot in Glasnevin Cemetery.

== Cultural depictions ==
She is the subject of "Grace", a song written in 1985 by Frank and Seán O'Meara, which became popular in Ireland and elsewhere and has been recorded by many musicians. The song was adopted by Green Brigade, a group of supporters of Celtic FC who attempted in December 2016 to make a version by the band Glasnevin, Christmas number one in the UK. This was in aid of a legal fund to pay for its member who received fines under the Offensive Behaviour at Football and Threatening Communications (Scotland) Act 2012 and for campaigning for its repeal.

She is one of the people seen buying a bond in John MacDonagh's newsreel of Michael Collins signing the first issue of Republican Bonds outside St Enda's, Rathfarnham in 1919. The film was archived by the Irish Film Institute.

== Publications ==
During her life, three books of Gifford's pen and ink drawings of Irish theatre and political figures were published.

- 1919: To Hold as Twere: a collection of 17 cartoons of political figures.
- 1929: Twelve Nights at the Abbey Theatre: a collection of cartoons depicting actors of the Abbey Theatre, Dublin.
- 1930: Doctors Recommend It: An Abbey Tonic in Twelve Doses: a collection of cartoons of scenes from named plays.
