= Irish Actors' Equity Association =

1941–1979 trade union representing actors & workers in Ireland

The Irish Actors' Equity Association (IAEA) was a trade union representing actors and workers in related fields in Ireland.

The union was founded on 21 March 1941, its founder members including Liam Redmond. Originally known as the Writers, Actors, Artists and Musicians Association, it became the Irish Actors' Equity Association in 1949.

On 6 December 1979, the union merged into the Irish Transport and General Workers' Union.
