= Kilmainham Gaol =

Prison museum in Dublin, Ireland

- Príosún Chill Mhaighneann
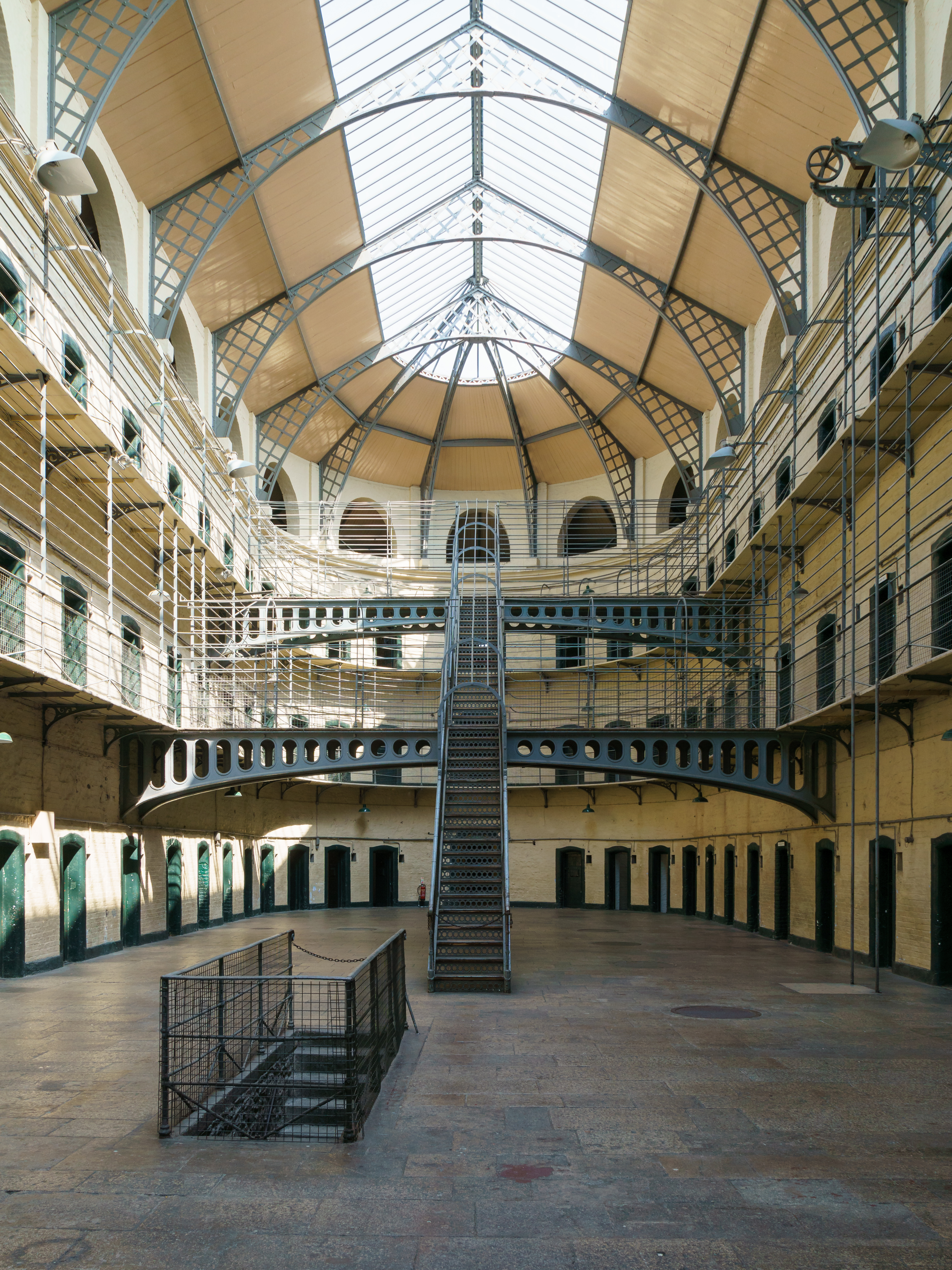
- Main Hall

- Location within Dublin
- Location: Kilmainham, Dublin, Ireland
- Coordinates: 53°20′30″N 06°18′34″W
- Type: Prison museum
- Owner: Office of Public Works
- Public transit access: Heuston railway station Suir Road Luas stop (Red Line)
- Website: kilmainhamgaolmuseum.ie

National monument of Ireland
- Official name: Kilmainham Gaol
- Reference no.: 675

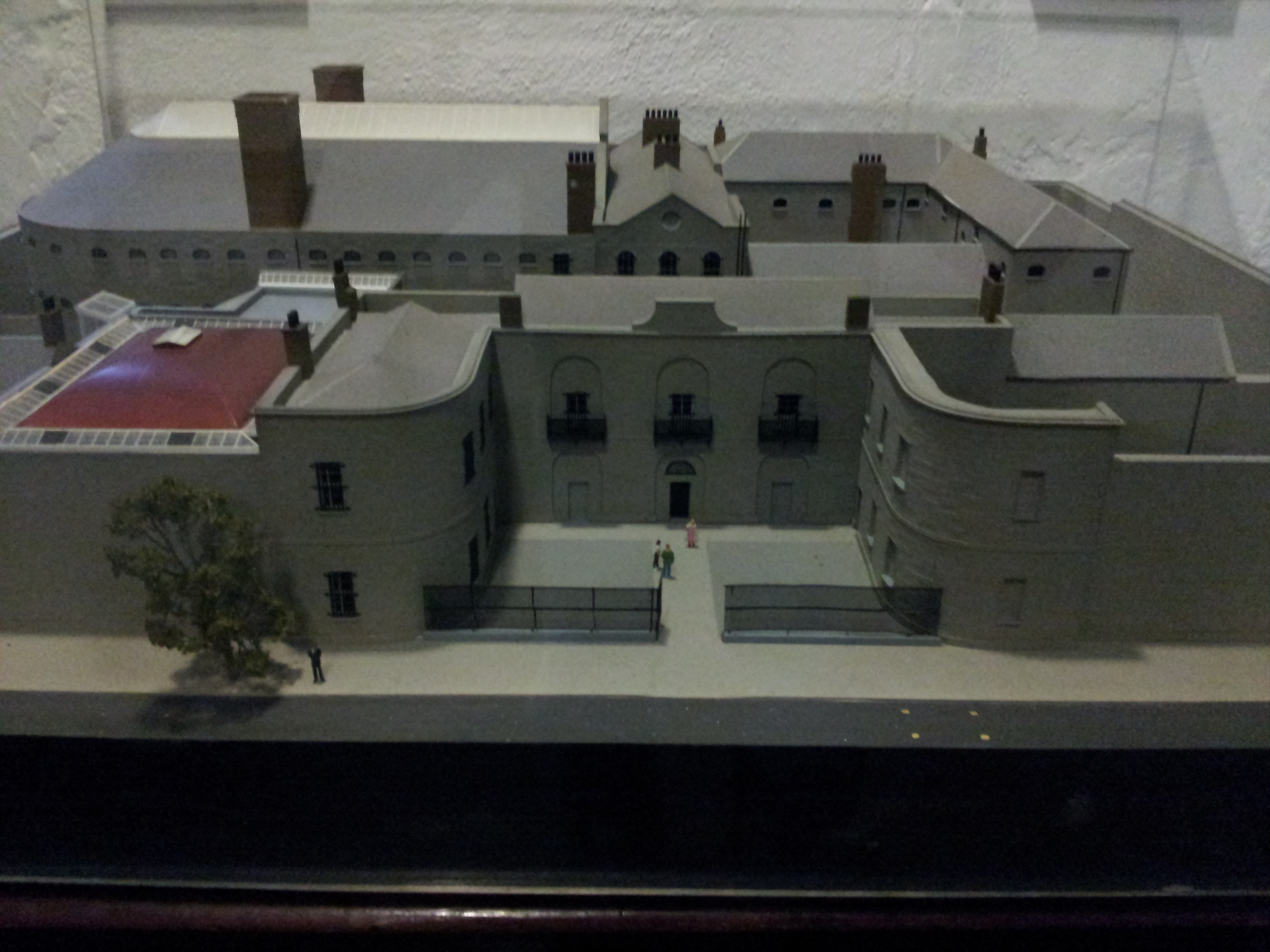
Model of Kilmainham Gaol

Kilmainham Gaol (Irish: Príosún Chill Mhaighneann) is a former prison in Kilmainham, Dublin. Opened in the late 18th century as the County of Dublin Gaol, it is now a museum run by the Office of Public Works. Many Irish revolutionaries, including the leaders of the 1916 Easter Rising (Patrick Pearse, James Connolly, Tom Clarke, Seán Mac Diarmada, Joseph Plunkett, Éamonn Ceannt, Thomas MacDonagh), were imprisoned and executed in the prison by the orders of the UK Government.

== History ==
When it was first built in 1796, Kilmainham Gaol was called the "New Gaol" to distinguish it from the old prison it was intended to replace – a noisome dungeon, just a few hundred metres from the present site. It was officially called the "County of Dublin Gaol", and was originally run by the Grand Jury for County Dublin.

Originally, public hangings took place at the front of the prison. However, from the 1820s onward very few hangings, public or private, took place at Kilmainham. A small hanging cell was built in the prison in 1891. It is located on the first floor, between the west wing and the east wing.

There was no segregation of prisoners; men, women and children were incarcerated up to 5 in each cell, with only a single candle for light and heat. Most of their time was spent in the cold and the dark, and each candle had to last for two weeks. Its cells were roughly 28 square metres in area.

Children were sometimes arrested for petty theft, the youngest said to be a three-year-old child, while many of the adult prisoners were transported to Australia.

At Kilmainham, the poor conditions in which women prisoners were kept provided the spur for the next stage of development. As early as 1809, in his report, the Inspector had observed that male prisoners were supplied with iron bedsteads while females "lay on straw on the flags in the cells and common halls". Half a century later there was little improvement. The women's section, located in the west wing, remained overcrowded.

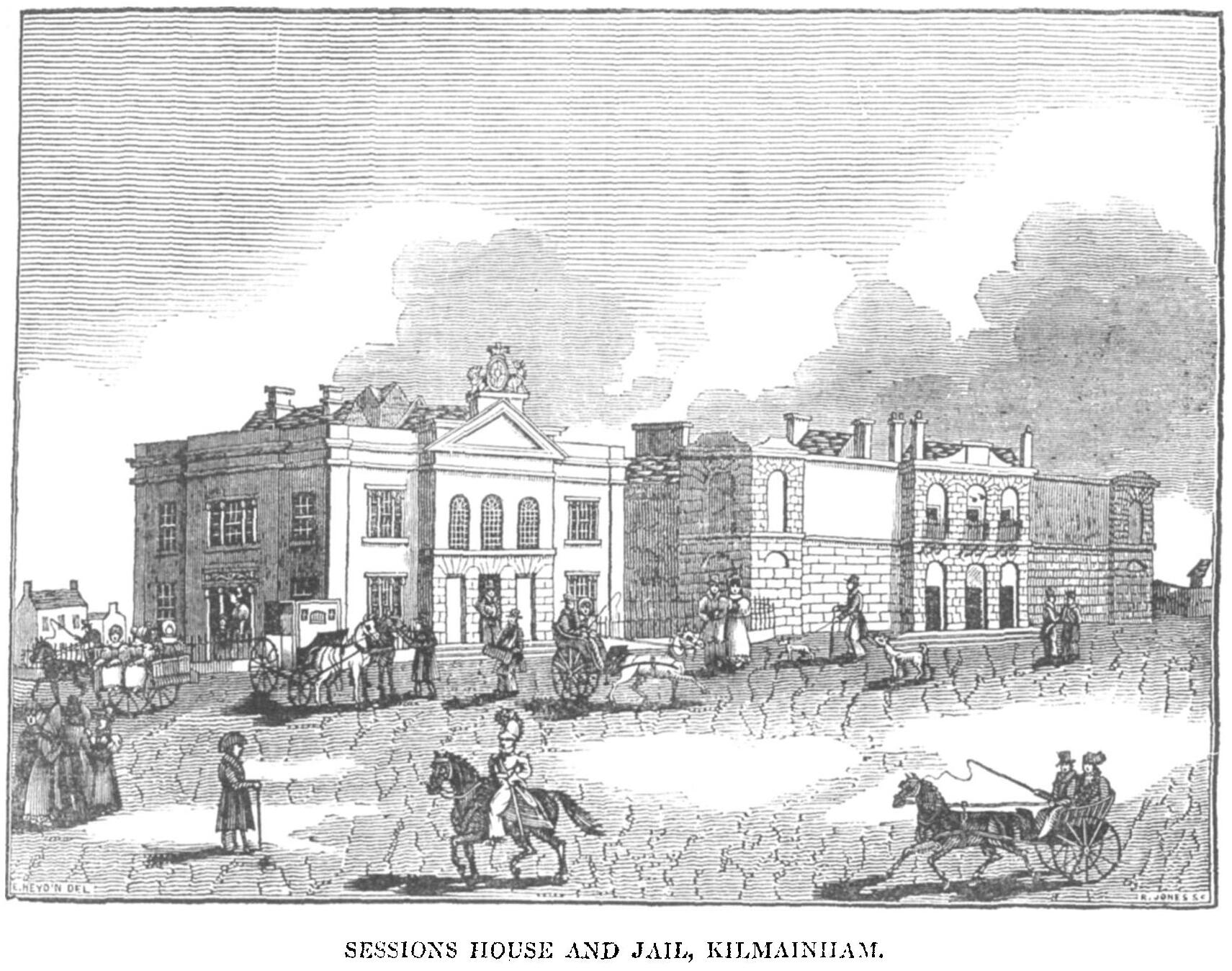
Sessions House and Jail, Kilmainham, 1836. Dublin Penny Journal

In an attempt to relieve the overcrowding, 30 female cells were added to the Gaol in 1840. These improvements had not been made long before the Great Famine occurred, and Kilmainham was overwhelmed with the increase of prisoners.

During the 1923 Irish hunger strikes Kilmainham was the site of several hunger strikes. In March 1923, 97 women went on hunger strike in Kilmainham Gaol after all of their privileges had been denied without explanation (that hunger strike ended later in the month with the restoration of privileges). Annie (Nan) Hogan of Cumann na mBan died at the age of 24 after being released from prison (September 1923) "in a very emaciated state" due to her participation in hunger strikes in Kilmainham and the North Dublin Union jails.

== Post-independence period ==
Kilmainham Gaol was decommissioned as a prison by the Irish Free State government in 1924. Seen principally as a site of oppression and suffering, there was at this time no declared interest in its preservation as a monument to the struggle for national independence. The jail's potential function as a location of national memory was also undercut and complicated by the fact that the first four Republican prisoners executed by the Free State government during the Irish Civil War were shot in the prison yard.

The Irish Prison Board contemplated reopening it as a prison during the 1920s but all such plans were finally abandoned in 1929. In 1936 the government considered the demolition of the prison but the price of this undertaking was seen as prohibitive. Republican interest in the site began to develop from the late 1930s, most notably with the proposal by the National Graves Association, a Republican organisation, to preserve the site as both a museum and memorial to the 1916 Easter Rising. This proposal received no objections from the Commissioners of Public Works, who costed it at £600, and negotiations were entered into with the Department of Education about the possibility of relocating artefacts relating to the 1916 Rising housed in the National Museum to a new museum at the Kilmainham Gaol site. The Department of Education rejected this proposal seeing the site as unsuitable for this purpose and suggested instead that paintings of nationalist leaders could be installed in appropriate prison cells. However, with the advent of the Emergency the proposal was shelved for the duration of the war.

An architectural survey commissioned by the Office of Public Works after World War II revealed that the prison was in a ruinous condition. With the Department of Education still intransigent to the site's conversion to a nationalist museum and with no other apparent function for the building, the Commissioners of Public Works proposed only the prison yard and those cell blocks deemed to be of national importance should be preserved and that the rest of the site should be demolished. This proposal was not acted upon.

In 1953 the Department of the Taoiseach, as part of a scheme to generate employment, re-considered the proposal of the National Graves Association to restore the prison and establish a museum at the site. However, no advance was made and the material condition of the prison continued to deteriorate.

== Kilmainham Gaol Restoration Society ==
From the late 1950s, a grassroots movement for the preservation of Kilmainham Gaol began to develop. Provoked by reports that the Office of Public Works was accepting tenders for the demolition of the building, Lorcan C.G. Leonard, a young engineer from the north side of Dublin, along with a small number of like-minded nationalists, formed the Kilmainham Gaol Restoration Society in 1958. In order to offset any potential division among its members, the society agreed that they should not address any of the events connected with the Civil War period in relation to the restoration project. Instead, a narrative of the unified national struggle was to be articulated. A scheme was then devised that the prison should be restored and a museum built using voluntary labour and donated materials.

With momentum for the project growing, the Irish Congress of Trade Unions informed the society that they would not oppose their plan and the Building Trades Council gave it their support. It is also likely that Dublin Corporation, which had shown an interest in the preservation of the prison, supported the proposal. At this time the Irish government was coming under increasing pressure from the National Graves Association and the Old IRA Literary and Debating Society to take action to preserve the site. Thus, when the society submitted their plan in late 1958 the government looked favourably on a proposal that would achieve this goal without occasioning any significant financial commitment from the state.

In February 1960 the society's detailed plan for the restoration project, which notably also envisioned the site's development as a tourist attraction, received the approval of the notoriously parsimonious Department of Finance. The formal handing over of prison keys to a board of trustees, composed of five members nominated by the society and two by the government, occurred in May 1960. The trustees were charged a nominal rent of one penny rent per annum to extend for a period of five years at which point it was envisaged that the restored prison would be permanently transferred to the trustees' custodial care.

Commencing with a workforce of sixty volunteers in May 1960, the society set about clearing the overgrown vegetation, trees, fallen masonry and bird droppings from the site. By 1962 the symbolically important prison yard where the leaders of the 1916 Rising were executed had been cleared of rubble and weeds and the restoration of the Victorian section of the prison was nearing completion. It opened to the public on 10 April 1966. The final restoration of the site was completed in 1971 when Kilmainham Gaol chapel was re-opened to the public having been reroofed and re-floored and with its altar reconstructed. The Magill family acted as residential caretakers, in particular, Joe Magill who worked on the restoration of the gaol from the start until the Gaol was handed over to the Office of Public works.

It now houses a museum on the history of Irish nationalism and offers guided tours of the building. An art gallery on the top floor exhibits paintings, sculptures and jewellery of prisoners incarcerated in prisons all over contemporary Ireland.

Kilmainham Gaol is one of the biggest unoccupied prisons in Europe.

In 2013, Kilmainham courthouse located beside the prison, which had remained in operation as a seat of the Dublin District court until 2008 was handed over to the OPW for refurbishment as part of a broader redevelopment of the Gaol and the surrounding Kilmainham Plaza in advance of the 100th anniversary of the 1916 Rising. The courthouse opened in 2015 as the attached visitor's centre for the Gaol.

== Historical importance ==
Kilmainham Gaol housed prisoners during the Irish War of Independence (1919–21) and many of the anti-treaty forces during the civil war period. Charles Stewart Parnell was imprisoned in Kilmainham Gaol, along with most of his parliamentary colleagues, in 1881-82 when he signed the Kilmainham Treaty with William Gladstone.

=== Former prisoners ===
Cell of Éamon de Valera.

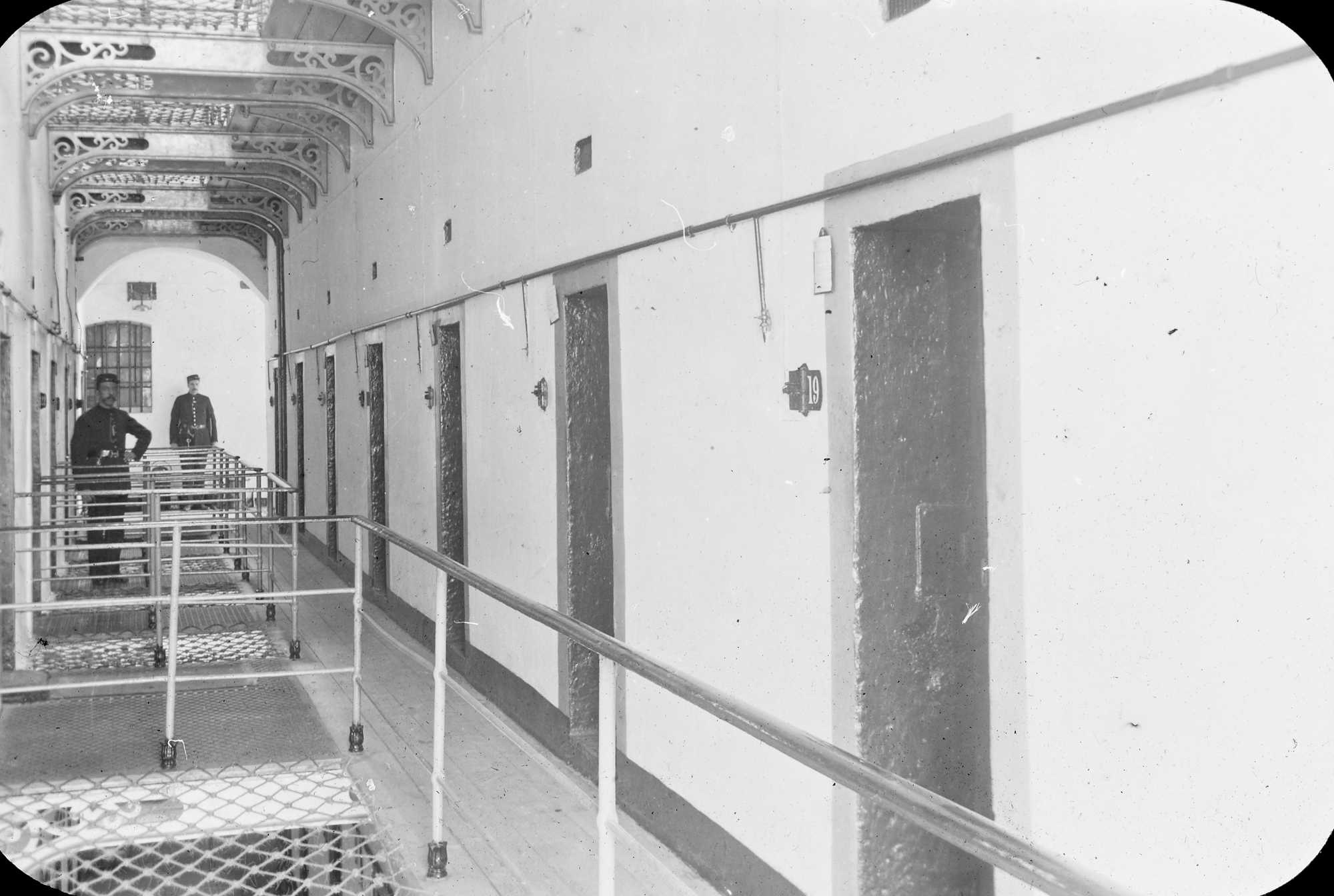
'Informers Corridor' pictured c.1890s

- Henry Joy McCracken, 1796
- Rev. Sinclair Kelburn, 1797
- Oliver Bond, 1798 (Bond, a native of St Johnston, County Donegal, was to die in the prison).
- James Bartholomew Blackwell, 1799
- James Napper Tandy, 1799
- Robert Emmet, 1803
- Anne Devlin, 1803
- Thomas Russell, 1803
- Michael Dwyer, 1803
- William Smith O'Brien, 1848
- Thomas Francis Meagher, 1848
- Jeremiah O'Donovan Rossa, 1867
- John O'Connor Power, 1868
- J. E. Kenny, 1881
- Hugh Mahon, 1881
- Charles Stewart Parnell, 1881
- William O'Brien, 1881
- James Joseph O'Kelly, 1881
- John Dillon, 1882
- Willie Redmond, 1882
- Joe Brady, (Phoenix Park Murders) 1883
- Daniel Curley, (Phoenix Park Murders) 1883
- Tim Kelly, (Phoenix Park Murders) 1883
- Thomas Caffrey, (Phoenix Park Murders) 1883
- Michael Fagan, (Phoenix Park Murders) 1883
- Michael Davitt
- Patrick Pearse, 1916
- Willie Pearse, (Younger brother of Patrick Pearse) 1916
- James Connolly, (Executed, but not held, at Kilmainham) 1916
- Conn Colbert, 1916
- Constance Markievicz, 1916
- Éamon de Valera, 1916 and 1923
- Peter Paul Galligan, 1916
- John MacBride, 1916
- Joseph Plunkett, 1916
- Michael O'Hanrahan, 1916
- Edward Daly, 1916
- Seán Mac Diarmada, 1916
- Grace Gifford, (wife of Joseph Plunkett) (1922)
- Ernie O'Malley, during the War of Independence and the Civil War
- Peadar O'Donnell, during the Civil War
- Frank McBreen, during War of Independence
- Thomas MacDonagh, 1916
- Thomas Clarke, 1916
- Mairead De Lappe, During the Civil War. (Mother of broadcaster Proinsias Mac Aonghusa)
- Madeleine ffrench-Mullen, 1916
- Bridie O'Mullane, during the Civil War

== Films ==
The following films have been filmed at Kilmainham Gaol:

- The Quare Fellow, 1962
- The Face of Fu Manchu, 1965 (starring Christopher Lee)
- The Italian Job, 1969
- Sitting Target, 1972 (starring Oliver Reed)
- The Mackintosh Man, 1973
- The Last Remake of Beau Geste, 1977
- The Whistle Blower, 1987
- The Babe, 1992
- In the Name of the Father, 1993
- Michael Collins, 1996
- The Young Indiana Jones Chronicles, 2000 – Love's Sweet Song
- The Escapist, 2008 (starring Brian Cox)
- The Wind That Shakes the Barley, 2006
- Paddington 2, 2017 (interior)

A music video for the U2 song "A Celebration" was filmed in Kilmainham Gaol in July 1982. The prison hosted a live performance from Irish band Fontaines D.C. on 14 June 2020, with the accompanying live album released as part of Record Store Day 2021. The prison was also used in the 2015 AMC series Into the Badlands, the 2012 BBC series Ripper Street, and the 2011 series of ITV's Primeval.

== Photographs ==
More photographs in Wikimedia Commons

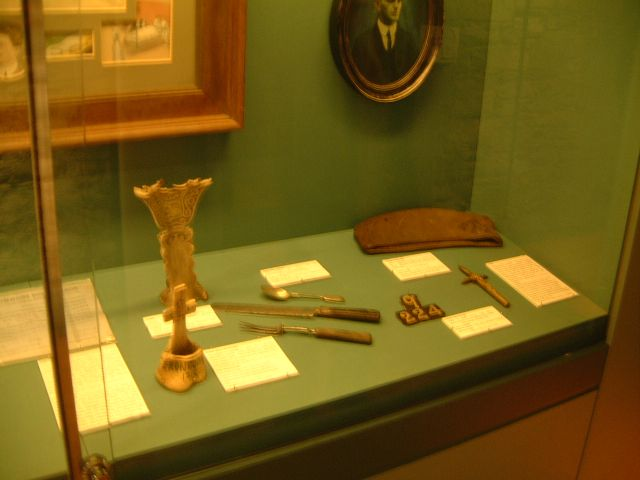
Prisoner crafts in Kilmainham Jail Museum.

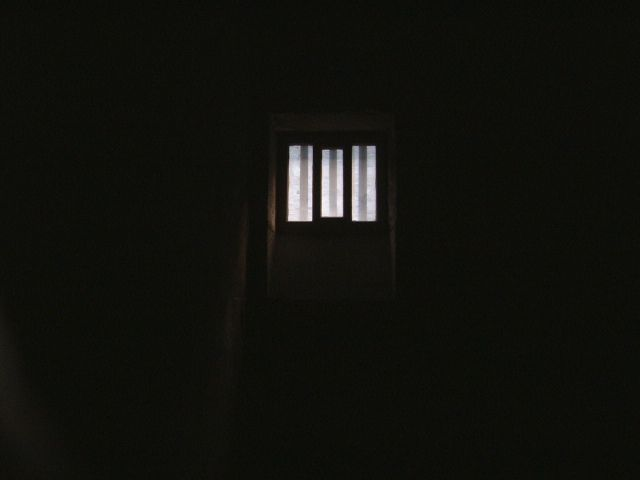
A view inside Patrick Pearse's cell.

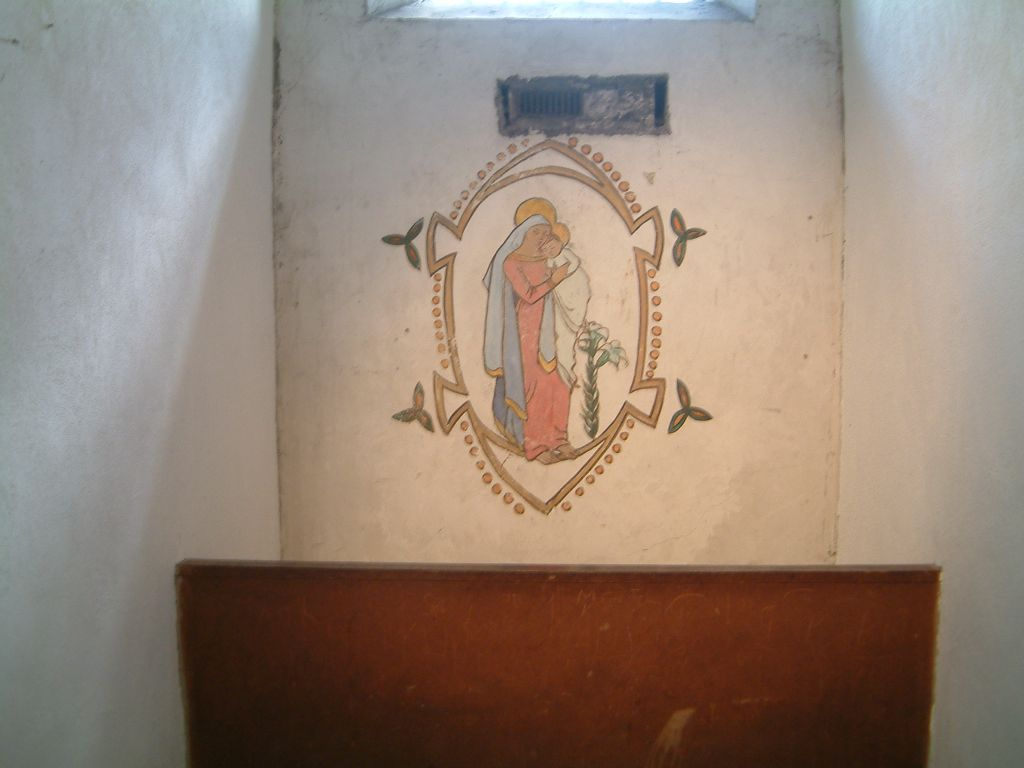
Mural of a Madonna painted by Grace Gifford Plunkett while she was held during the Civil War.

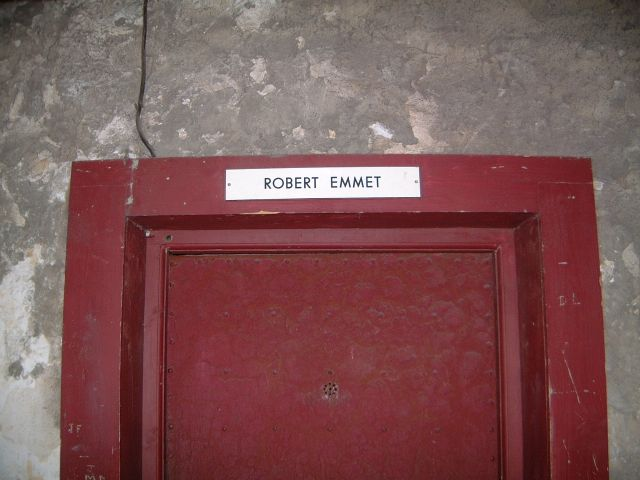
Robert Emmet's cell door.

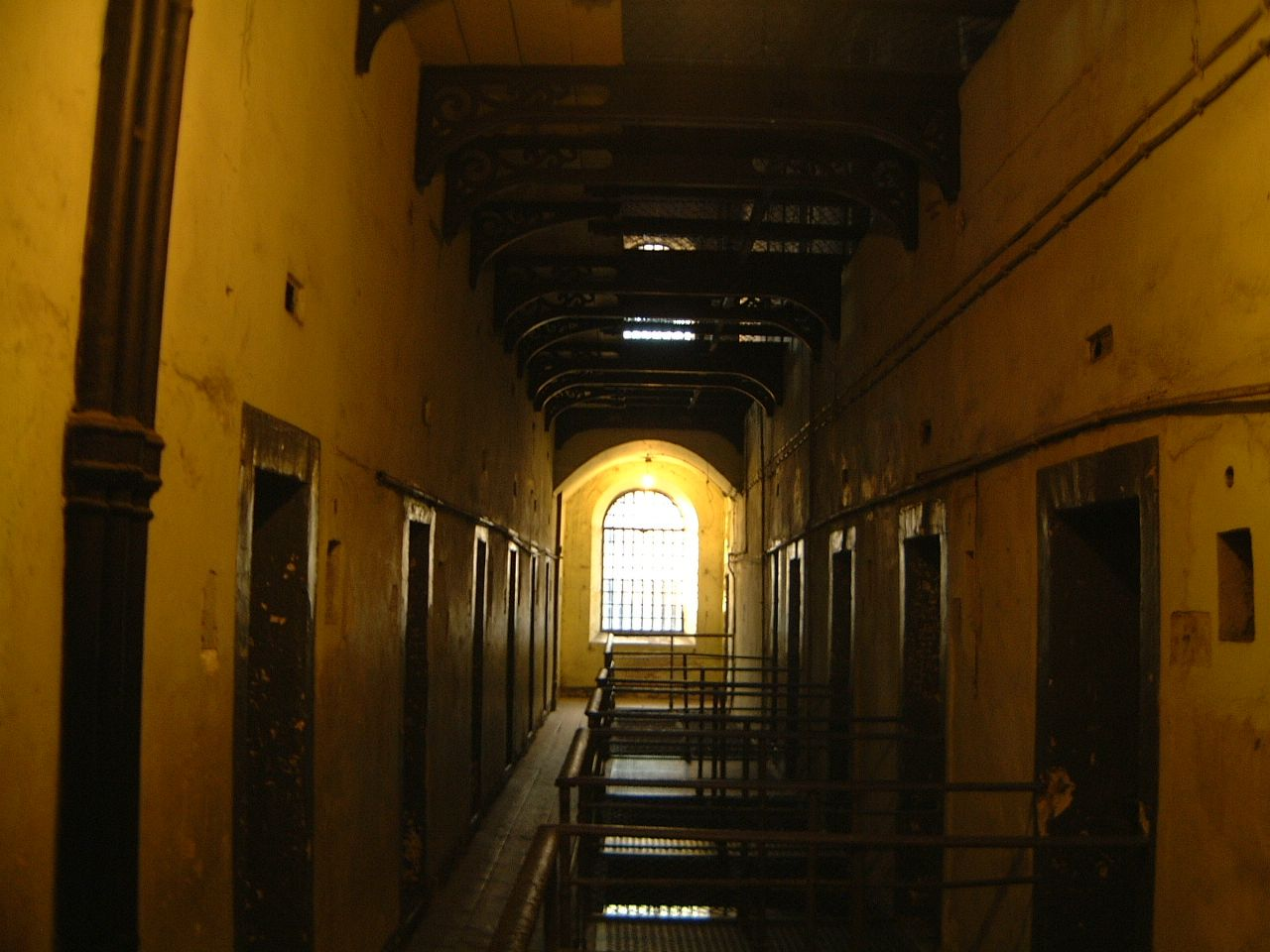
A view of the landing where the 1916 leaders were held before their execution.

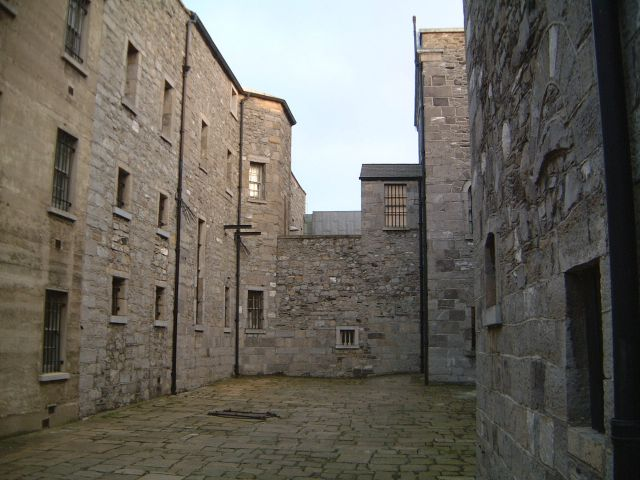
The view from the prison courtyards.

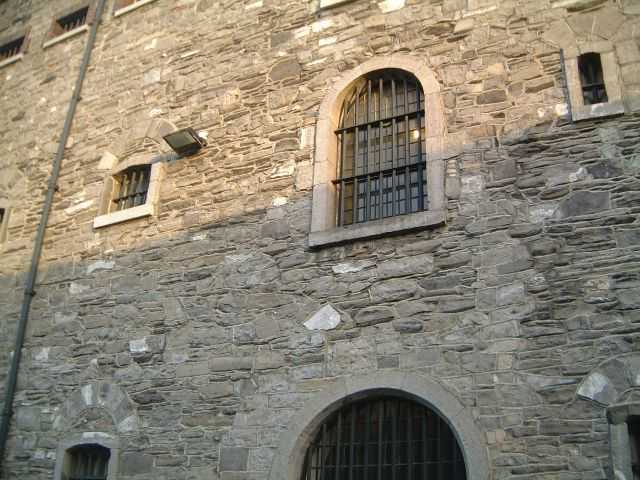
The view from the prison courtyards.

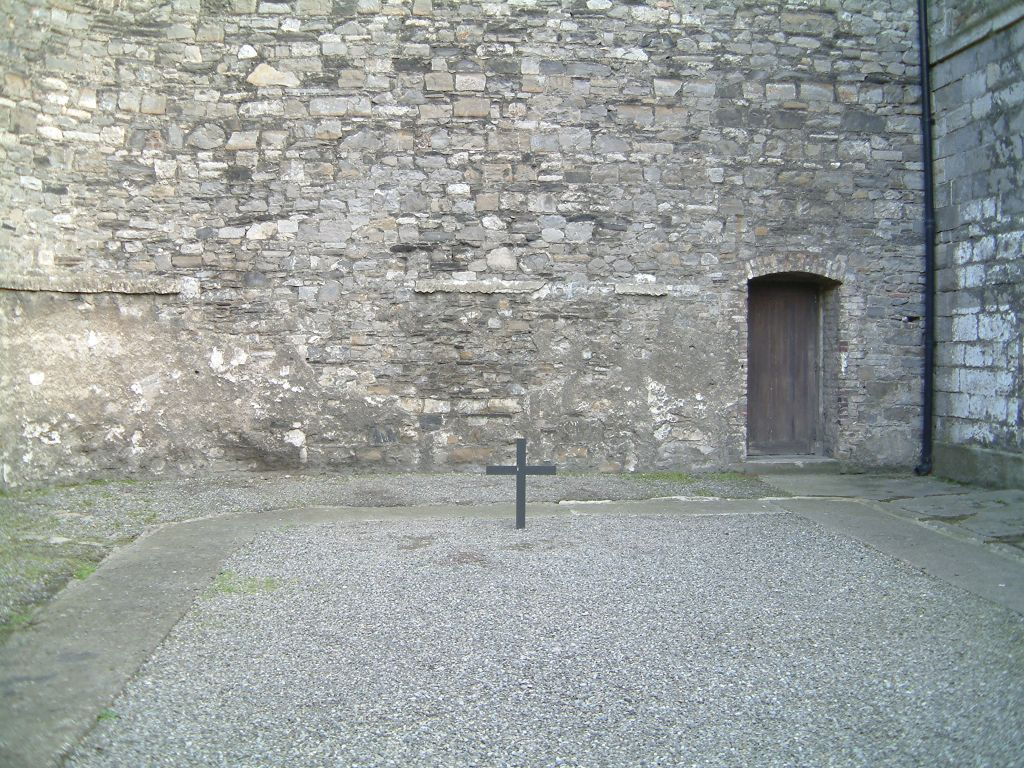
Cross marking the place of execution of the leaders of the 1916 Rising.

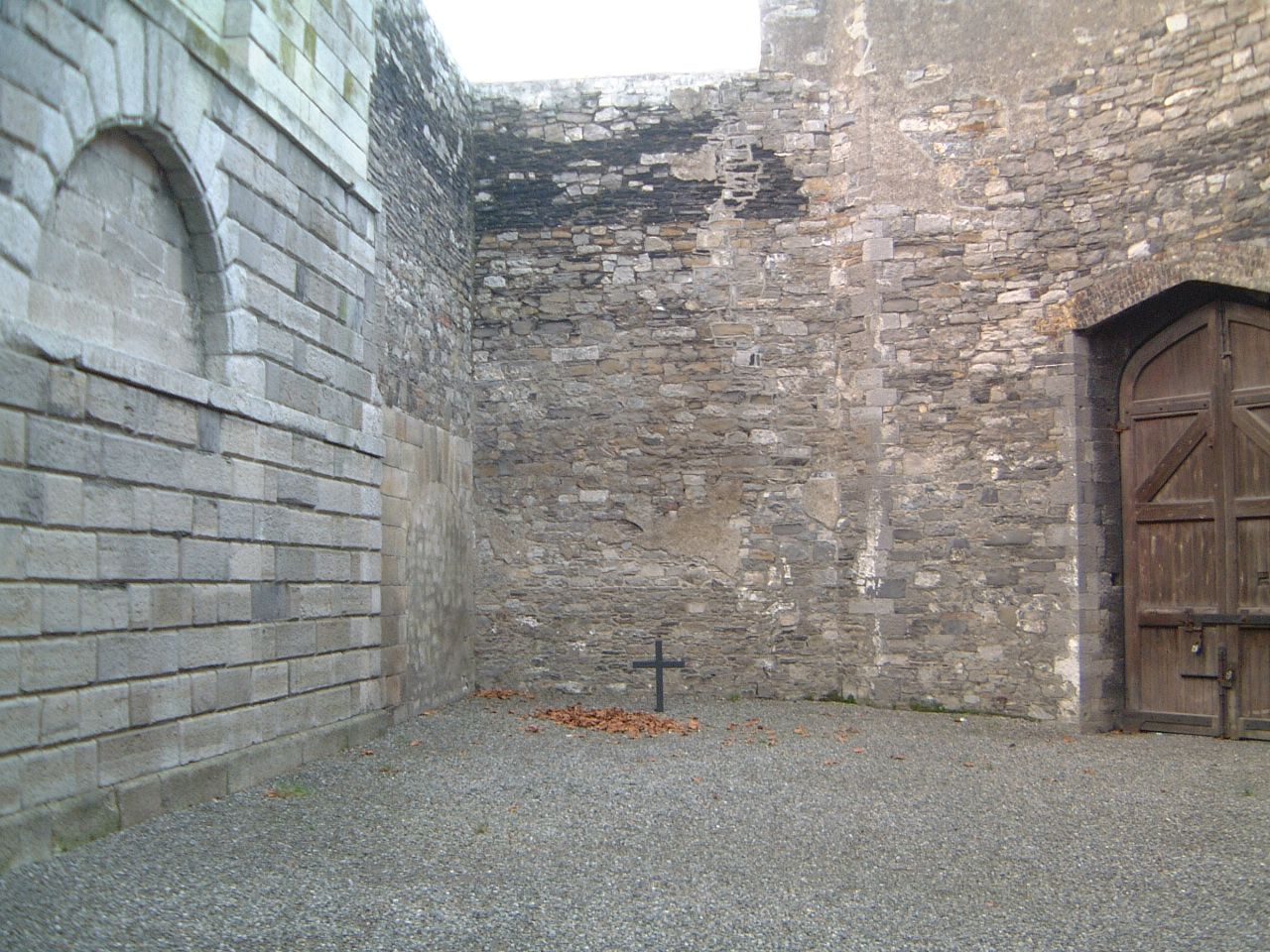
Cross marking the place of execution of James Connolly.

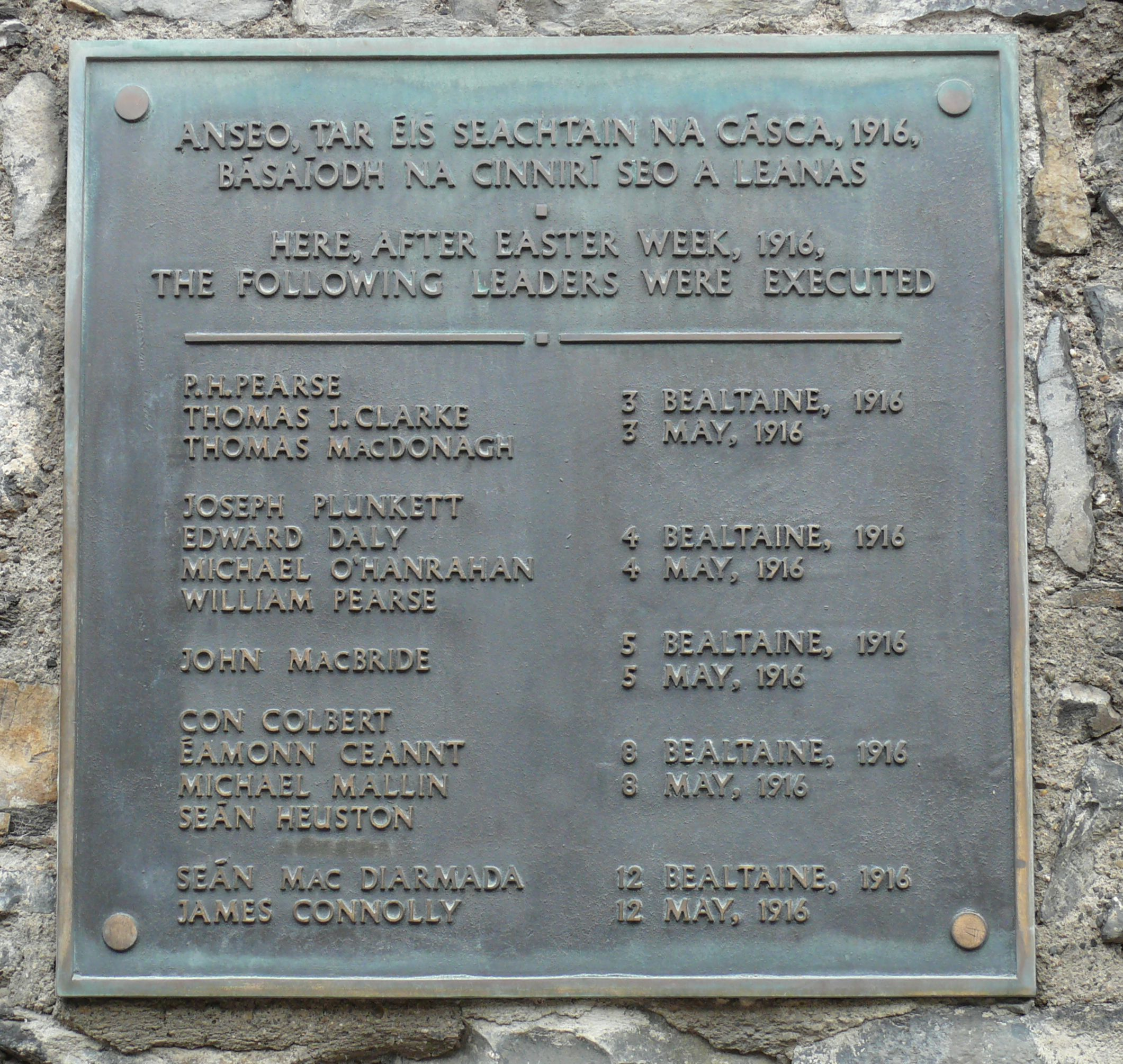
Plaque marking the executions of the leaders of the 1916 Rising.

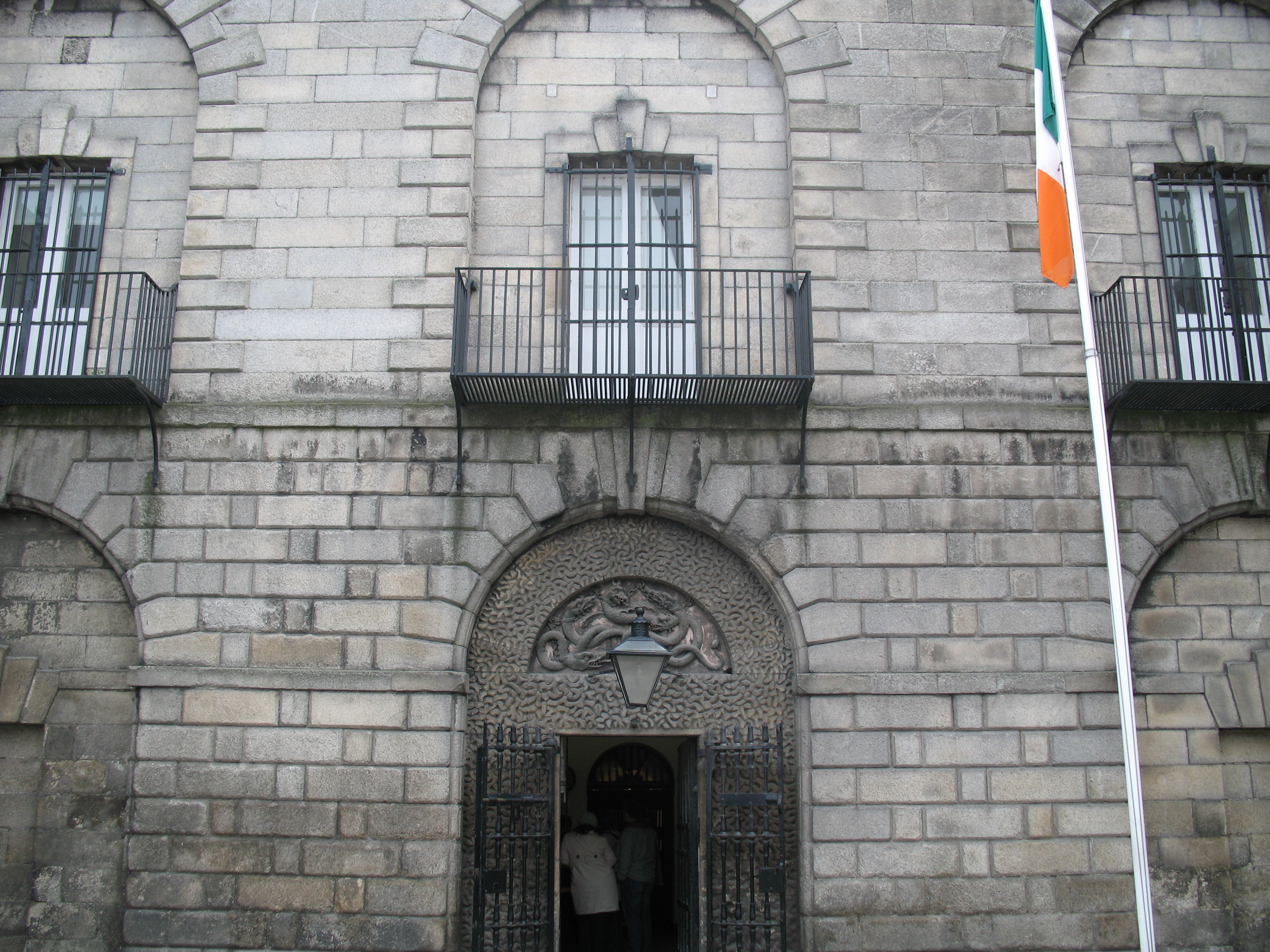
Entrance to Kilmainham Gaol, Five Snakes in Chains above Entrance.

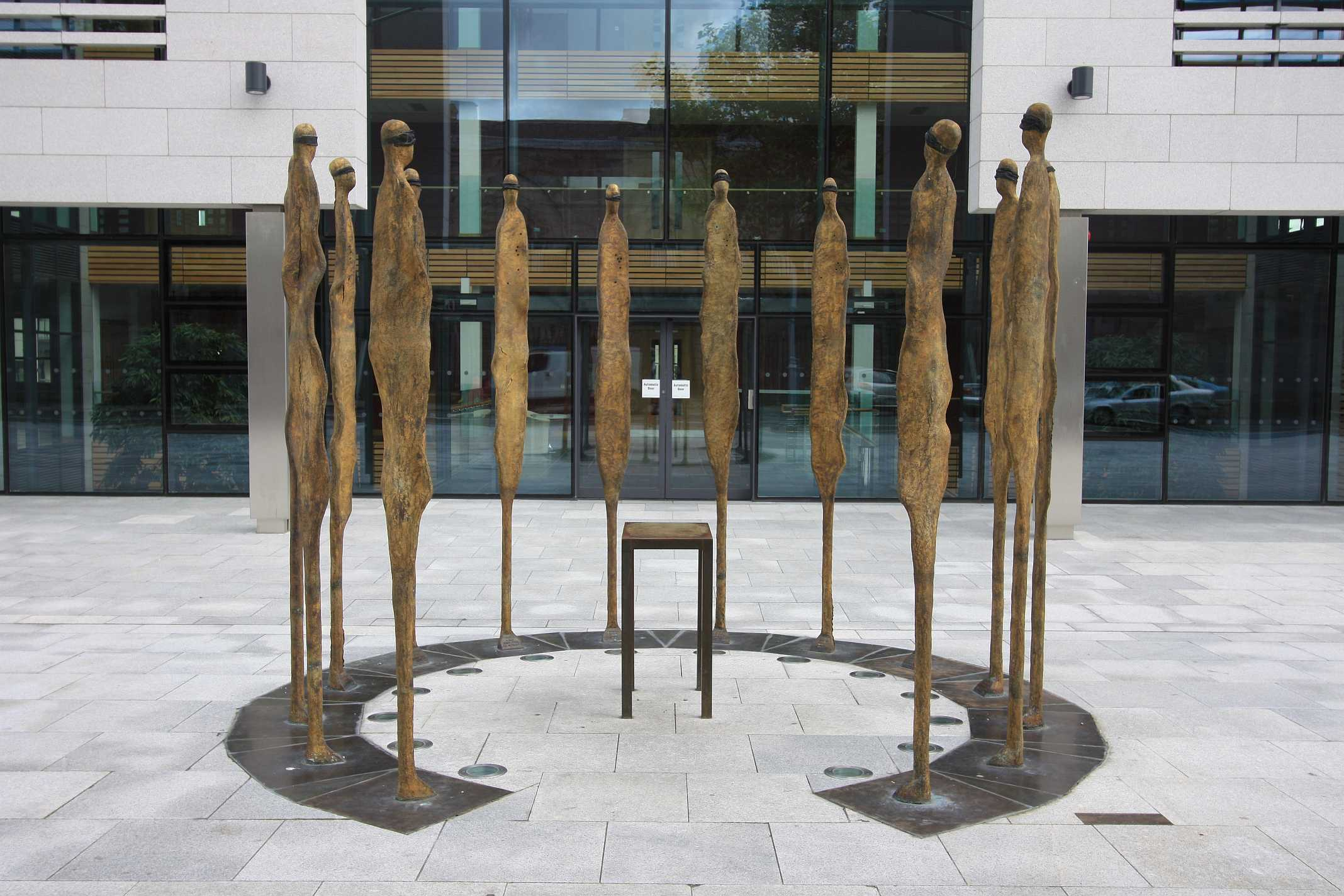
The Proclamation Statue by Rowan Gillespie, 2008 across the road from the main entrance to Kilmainham Jail. It commemorates the 14 leaders of the 1916 uprising executed at Kilmainham.

== See also ==
- Prisons in Ireland
