= Muriel MacDonagh =

Irish nationalist

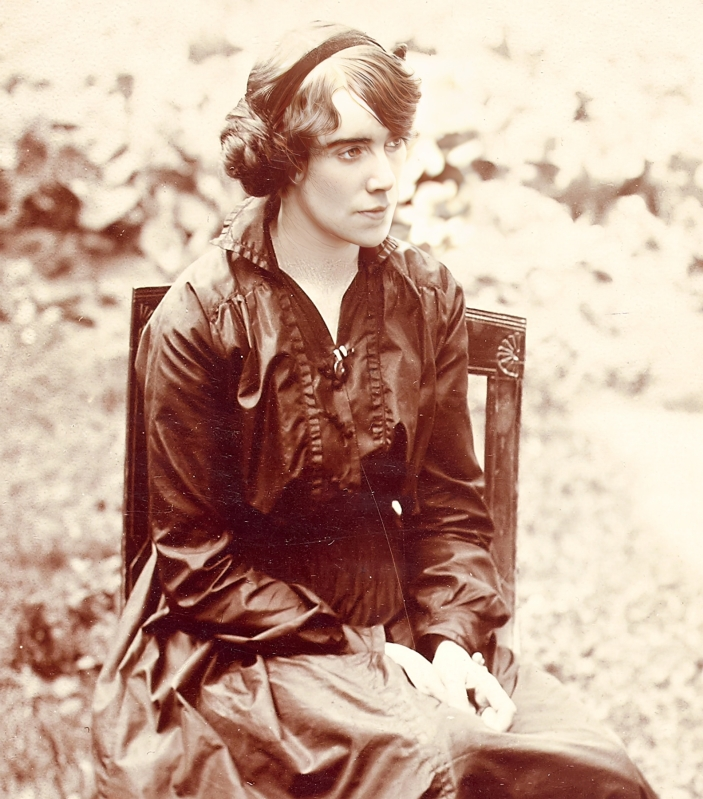
- Born: Muriel Enid Gifford; 18 December 1884; Rathmines, Dublin, Ireland
- Died: 9 July 1917 (aged 32); Skerries, County Dublin
- Resting place: Glasnevin Cemetery, Dublin, Ireland
- Spouse: Thomas MacDonagh (m. 1912; died 1916)
- Relatives: 11 siblings, including: Grace Gifford; Sidney Gifford; Nellie Gifford

Muriel MacDonagh (née Gifford; 18 December 1884 – 9 July 1917) was an Irish nationalist, and member of Inghinidhe na hÉireann. Her husband Thomas MacDonagh, was one of the signatories of the Proclamation of the Irish Republic, which led to the Easter Rebellion.

== Early life ==
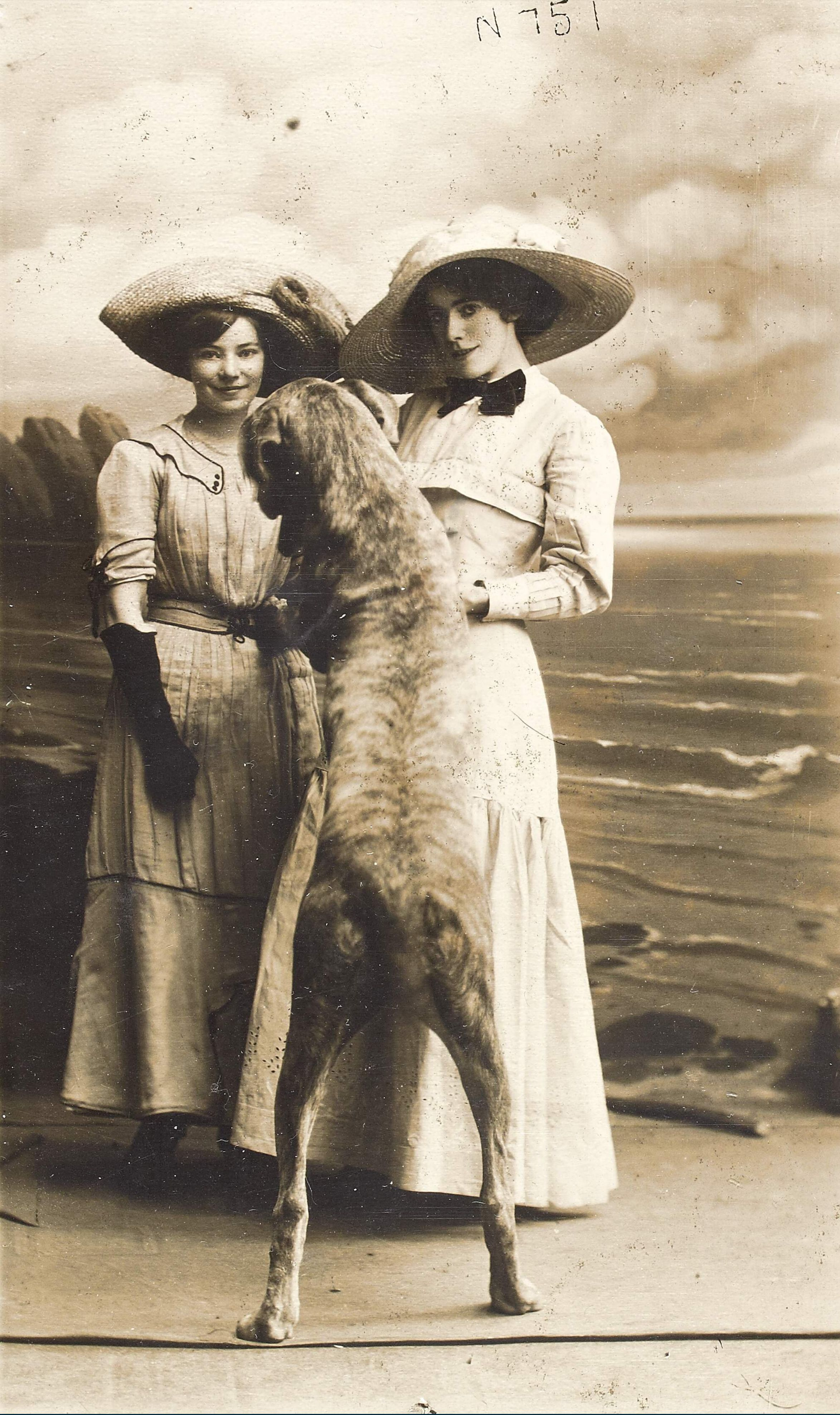
Muriel and Sidney Gifford in 1911

Muriel Enid Gifford was born at 12 Cowper Road, Rathmines on 18 December 1884. She was the fourth daughter and eighth child of twelve of Frederick and Isabella Gifford. As a child, she suffered at different times from rheumatic fever and phlebitis. She attended Alexandra College, and spent a brief time in England training to as a poultry instructor. Returning to Ireland, she trained at Sir Patrick Dun's Hospital, Dublin as a student nurse, but her health suffered from the work.

== Nationalism ==
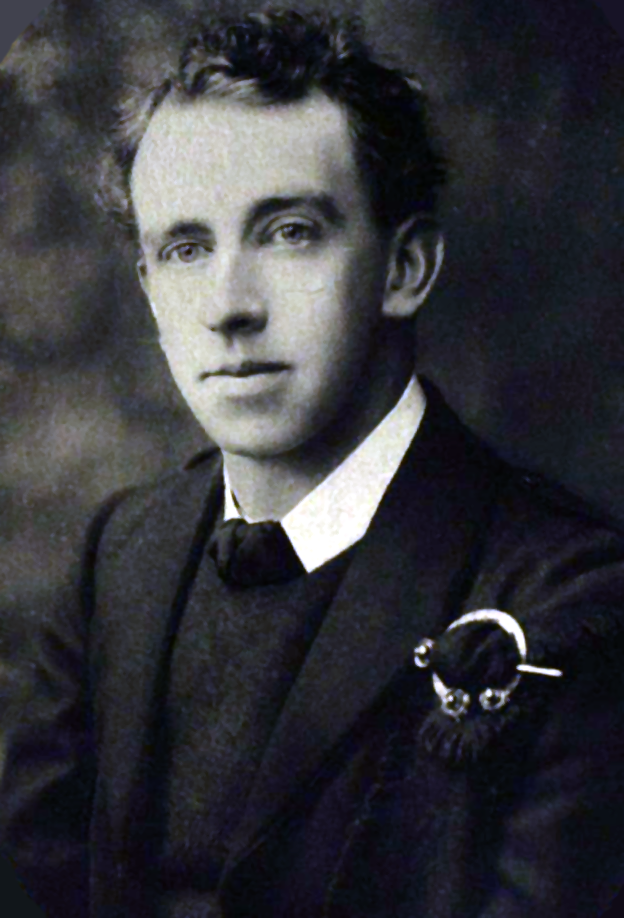
Muriel's husband Thomas MacDonagh

Along with her sisters, MacDonagh was active in the Women's Franchise League and Inghinidhe na hÉireann, a nationalist organisation. She was involved in the school meals programme of 1910 to 1911, took part in a 1914 Women's Franchise League fundraiser, appearing in a tableau vivant as Maeve, the Warrior Queen. Less ardently feminist than her sisters, MacDonagh took delight in inviting home activists and artists for a "proper meal". In an outgoing family, she was shy and reserved, known for her gentle manner. In 1908 she was introduced to Thomas MacDonagh by suffragette journalist Nora Dryhurst along with her sisters, Grace and Sidney, on a visit to St Enda's School. Dryhurst advised Thomas to "fall in love with one of these girls and marry her", to which he replied laughingly "That would be easy; the only difficulty would be to decide which one". The Gifford sisters remained acquaintances with Thomas until the autumn of 1911, when the couple had a short and intense courtship. They would meet secretly in galleries and museums, and had copious correspondence. When he was appointed assistant lecturer to University College Dublin in December 1911, they married on 3 January 1912. They had one son, Donagh MacDonagh, and one daughter, Barbara MacDonagh Redmond. The family lived first at 32 Baggot Street, and later at 29 Oakley Road, Rathmines.

== Later life ==
MacDonagh suffered with poor health and depression, which led to periods of convalescence and confinement. When her husband was arrested after the Easter 1916 Rising, she was unable to see him before his execution on 3 May 1916, which heightened the intensity of her bereavement. Devastated by his death, and estranged from her parents due to their disapproval his involvement in the Rising, she lived with the Plunketts at Larkfield, Kimmage briefly, and then with relatives of her husband's in Thurles, County Tipperary. She later returned to Dublin to rent rooms in a Plunkett family property, 50 Marlborough Road. With two young children to support, she was nearly destitute, but like the other widows and orphans of the executed leaders of the Rising, they were aided by the Irish Volunteers Dependents' Fund, in her case with £250. She also served as an officer and committee member on this aid association. Her husband named her as his literary executor, and she prepared a collected edition of his poetry that was published in October 1916. The success of this volume, and his bestselling Literature in Ireland, due to be published at the time he was executed, eased her financial difficulties somewhat.

She converted to Catholicism on 3 May 1917.

== Death ==
MacDonagh died while swimming in the sea during a holiday with other 1916 widows and orphans in Skerries, County Dublin on 9 July 1917. She had almost not attended the holiday, as her son was in hospital having been injured in a fall. It is believed that she was attempting to swim to Shenick Island from Skerries, it is thought she may have wanted to place a tricolour flag on the island's Martello Tower. Her body was found near Loughshinny Beach, and as there was no water in her lungs, it was concluded that she died of heart failure and not drowning. As there was great interest in the 1916 widows and their families, her funeral at Glasnevin Cemetery attracted a large crowd of mourners estimated at 5,000 in the funeral procession. Following her death, there was a legal custody battle between the Giffords and the MacDonaghs over Donagh and Barbara. Their aunt Mary MacDonagh, a nun known as Sister Francesca and with whom MacDonagh had grown close, won custody. Even though several of her siblings offered to take the children, she placed them in a foster home.

On the centenary of her death, a festival took place in Skerries in MacDonagh's memory.
