= Thomas MacDonagh =

Irish revolutionary (1878–1916)

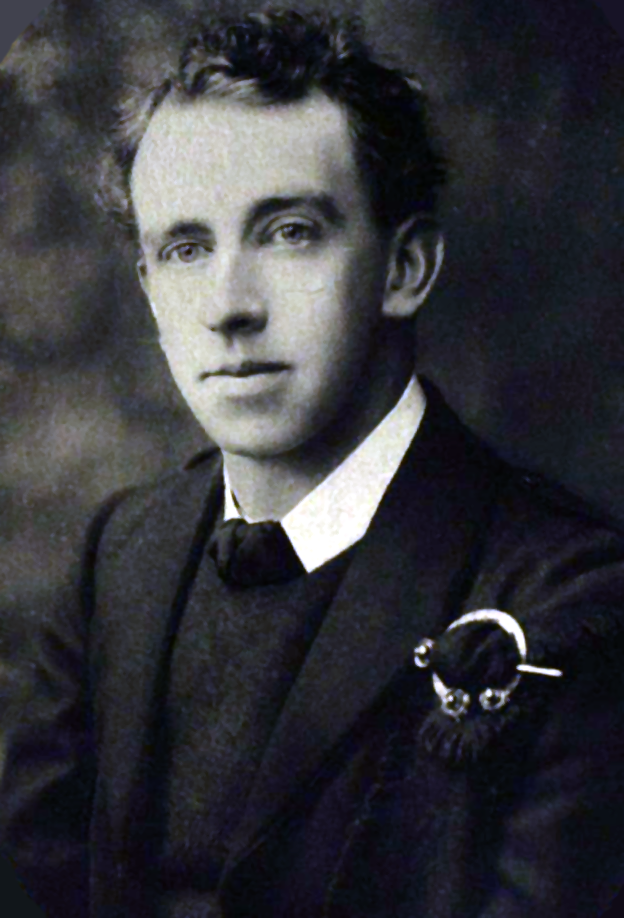
- Born: 1 February 1878; Cloughjordan, County Tipperary, Ireland
- Died: 3 May 1916 (aged 38); Kilmainham Gaol, Dublin, Ireland
- Cause of death: Execution by firing squad
- Spouse: Muriel Gifford
- Children: Barbara MacDonagh; Donagh MacDonagh
- Military career
- Allegiance: Irish Republic
- Branch: Irish Volunteers
- Service years: 1913–1916
- Rank: Commandant
- Commands: Director of Training, Irish Volunteers; Commander, Dublin Brigade, Irish Volunteers; Commander, 2nd Battalion, Dublin Brigade
- Conflicts: Easter Rising
- Memorials: Kilkenny MacDonagh railway station

Thomas Stanislaus MacDonagh (Irish: Tomás Anéislis Mac Donnchadha; 1 February 1878 – 3 May 1916) was an Irish political activist, poet, playwright, educationalist and revolutionary leader. He was one of the seven leaders of the Easter Rising of 1916, a signatory of the Proclamation of the Irish Republic and Commandant of the 2nd Battalion, Dublin Brigade of the Irish Volunteers, which fought in Jacob's biscuit factory. He was executed for his part in the Rising at the age of thirty-eight.

MacDonagh was assistant headmaster at St. Enda's School, Scoil Éanna, and lecturer in English at University College Dublin. He was a member of the Gaelic League, where he befriended Patrick Pearse and Eoin MacNeill. He wrote poetry and plays. His play, When the Dawn is Come, was produced by the Abbey Theatre in 1908. Other plays include Metempsychosis, 1912 and Pagans, 1915, both produced by the Irish Theatre Company.

== Early life ==
He was born Cloughjordan, County Tipperary, to Joseph McDonagh, a schoolmaster, and Mary Parker. He grew up in a household filled with music, poetry and learning and was instilled with a love of both English and Irish culture from a young age. His brothers included future Sinn Féin politician, Joseph, and film director John.

Both his parents were teachers; who strongly emphasised education. MacDonagh attended Rockwell College. While there MacDonagh spent several years as a scholastic, sometimes a preparation for a missionary career, however, after a few years he realised that it wasn't the life for him, and left. Very soon after, he published his first book of poems, Through the Ivory Gate, in 1902. He taught in St Kieran's College in Kilkenny and from 1903 he was employed as a professor of French, English and Latin at St. Colman's College, Fermoy, County Cork, where he also formed a branch of the Gaelic League. While in Fermoy, MacDonagh was one of the founding members of ASTI, the secondary teachers trade union which was formed in the Fermoy College in 1908. He moved to Dublin, soon establishing strong friendships with such men as Eoin MacNeill and Patrick Pearse.

== Teaching ==
His friendship with Pearse and his love of Irish led him to join the staff of Pearse's bilingual St. Enda's School upon its establishment in 1908, taking the role of French and English teacher and Assistant Headmaster. He was one of the founders of the teachers' trade union ASTI (Association of Secondary Teachers in Ireland). MacDonagh was essential to the school's early success, on his marriage he took the position of lecturer in English at the National University, while continuing to support St Enda's. MacDonagh remained devoted to the Irish language, and in 1910 he became tutor to a younger member of the Gaelic League, Joseph Plunkett. The two were both poets with an interest in the Irish Theatre and formed a lifelong friendship.

On 3 January 1912 he married Muriel Gifford (a member of the Church of Ireland, though neither she nor he was a churchgoer); their son, Donagh, was born that November, and their daughter, Barbara, in March 1915. Muriel's sister, Grace Gifford, was to marry Joseph Mary Plunkett hours before his execution in 1916.

MacDonagh was a member of the Irish Women's Franchise League. He supported the strikers during the Dublin lockout and was a member of the "Industrial Peace Committee" alongside Joseph Plunkett, whose stated aim was to achieve a fair outcome to the dispute.

== Republicanism ==
MacDonagh joined the Irish Volunteers in December 1913, was elected to its Provisional Committee, and served on both the Central Executive and the General Council. In December 1914, he was appointed to the headquarters staff as Director of Training. In March 1915, he was appointed Commandant of the 2nd Battalion, and later was also appointed Commandant of the Dublin Brigade. Although originally a pure constitutionalist, through his dealings with men such as Pearse, Plunkett, and Seán Mac Diarmada, and through the increasing militarisation of Europe in the onset of World War I, MacDonagh developed stronger republican beliefs, joining the Irish Republican Brotherhood (IRB), probably during the summer of 1915. Around this time Tom Clarke asked him to plan the grandiose funeral of Jeremiah O'Donovan Rossa, which was a resounding propaganda success, largely due to the graveside oration delivered by Pearse.

== Easter Rising ==
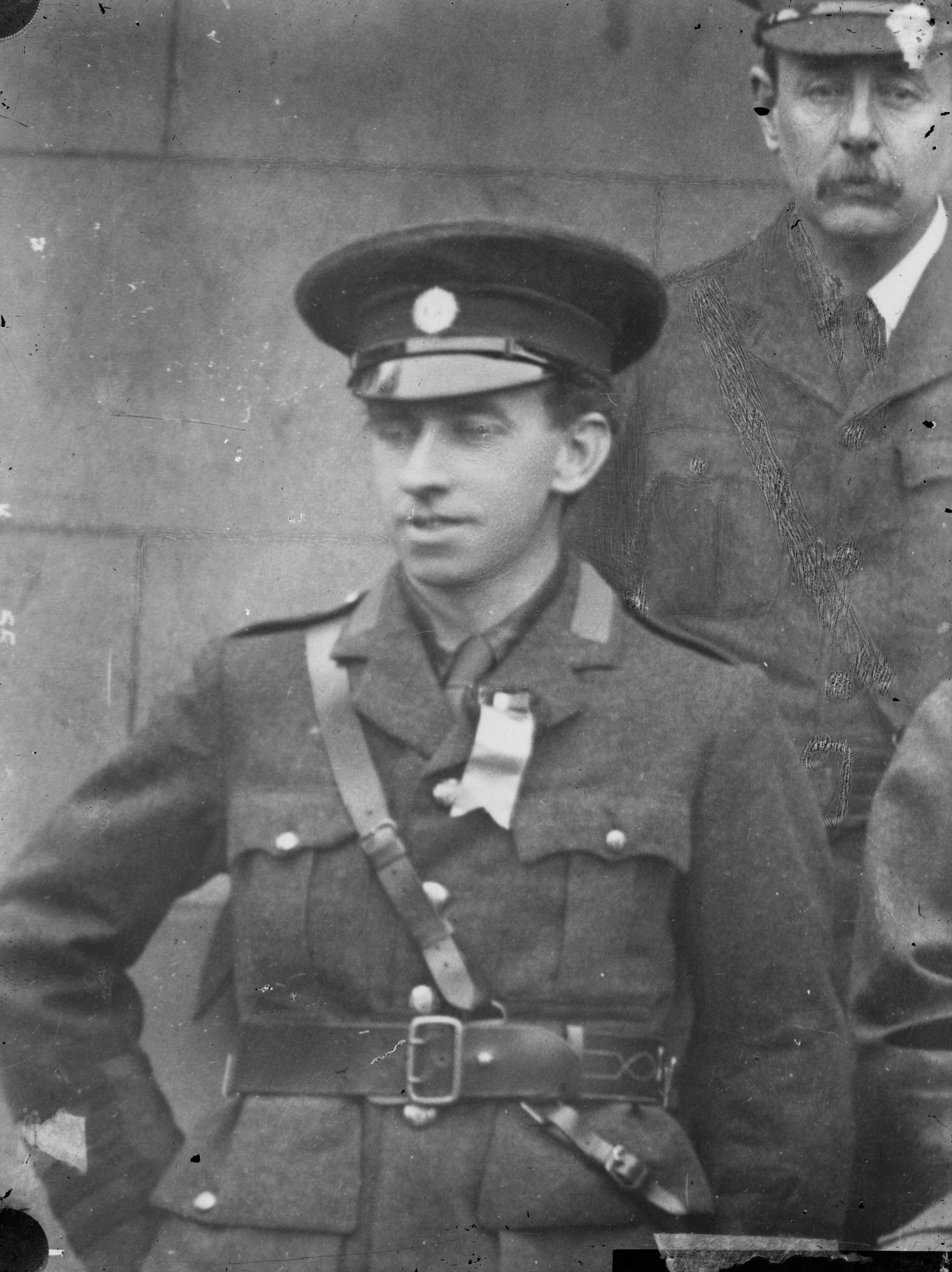
Thomas MacDonagh in military uniform (1915)

Though credited as one of the Easter Rising's seven leaders, MacDonagh was a late addition to that group. He didn't join the secret Military Council that planned the rising until April 1916, weeks before the rising took place. The reason for his admittance at such a late date is uncertain. Still a relative newcomer to the IRB, men such as Clarke may have been hesitant to elevate him to such a high position too soon, which raises the question as to why he should be admitted at all. His close ties to Pearse and Plunkett may have been the cause, as well as his position as commandant of the Dublin Brigade (though his position as such would later be superseded by James Connolly as commandant-general of the Dublin division). Nevertheless, MacDonagh was a signatory of the Proclamation of the Republic.

During the rising, MacDonagh's battalion was stationed at the massive complex of Jacob's Biscuit Factory. On the way to this destination the battalion encountered the veteran Fenian, John MacBride, who on the spot joined the battalion as second-in-command, and in fact took over part of the command throughout Easter Week, although he had had no prior knowledge and was in the area by accident.

As it was, despite MacDonagh's rank and the fact that he commanded one of the strongest battalions, they saw little fighting, as the British Army avoided the factory as they established positions in central Dublin. MacDonagh received the order to surrender on 30 April, though his entire battalion was fully prepared to continue the engagement. Following the surrender, MacDonagh was court martialled, and executed by firing squad on 3 May 1916, aged thirty-eight. He was the 3rd signatory of the Proclamation to be shot. It is said that as he was taken from his cell to be executed he whistled.

His widow, Muriel, died of heart failure while swimming in Skerries, County Dublin on 9 July 1917; his son Donagh MacDonagh became a judge, and was also a prominent poet, Broadway playwright, songwriter and broadcaster, a central member of the Irish literary revival of the 1940s/1960s. He married Nuala Smyth and they had four children. His daughter Barbara married the actor Liam Redmond and they had four children. During the 1950s and 1960s, she wrote many scripts for Radio Éireann, the Irish national radio broadcaster, using her husband's more famous name.

== Reputation and commemoration ==
MacDonagh was generally credited with being one of the most gregarious and personable of the Rising's leaders. Geraldine Plunkett Dillon, a sister of Joseph Plunkett gives a contemporary description of him in her book All in the Blood: "As soon as Tomás came into our house everyone was a friend of his. He had a pleasant, intelligent face and was always smiling, and you had the impression that he was always thinking about what you were saying." In Mary Colum's Life and the Dream, she writes of hearing about the Rising from America, where she was living with her husband, Pádraic Colum, remembering Tomás MacDonagh saying to her: "This country will be one entire slum unless we get into action, in spite of our literary movements and Gaelic Leagues it is going down and down. There is no life or heart left in the country."

A prominent figure in the Dublin literary world, he was commemorated in several poems by W.B. Yeats. Yeats most famous nationalist poem Easter 1916 makes an allusion to MacDonagh as a friend of Pearse: "This other his helper and friend/ Was coming into his force/ He might have won fame in the end/ So sensitive his nature seemed/ So daring and sweet his thought". His friend Francis Ledwidge's Lament for Thomas MacDonagh also commemorates him. In a poem rich with allegory – the Dark Cow (Irish: Bó Orann) is an 18th-century symbol of Ireland, for instance – Ledwidge wrote:

He shall not hear the bittern cry
In the wild sky, where he is lain,
Nor voices of the sweeter birds
Above the wailing of the rain

Nor shall he know when loud March blows
Thro' slanting snows her fanfare shrill,
Blowing to flame the golden cup
Of many an upset daffodil.

But when the Dark Cow leaves the moor
And pastures poor with greedy weeds,
Perhaps he'll hear her low at morn,
Lifting her horn in pleasant meads.

Thomas MacDonagh Tower in Ballymun, Dublin, which was built in the 1960s and demolished in June 2005, was named after him. MacDonagh had taught in St Kieran's College, Kilkenny City during the early years of his career, where MacDonagh Railway Station was named in his memory, as was the MacDonagh Junction shopping centre.

The Thomas MacDonagh Heritage Centre in Cloughjordan, County Tipperary was opened in 2013. The centre houses the town library and exhibition space. An annual Thomas MacDonagh Summer School takes place in Cloughjordan over the May bank holiday weekend.

Gaelic Athletic Association clubs and grounds named after MacDonagh have been established in County Tipperary (Kilruane, Nenagh and a North Tipperary amalgamation).

The McDonagh Barracks group of buildings represents one of the largest individual components of the Curragh Camp in Kildare. The nearby pitch & putt also bears his name.

As MacDonough was a founding member, the Association of Secondary Teachers, Ireland (ASTI) awards the 'Thomas MacDonough Medal' for "extraordinary service to the union by members".

== Works ==
His works include:

- Through the Ivory Gate
- April and May
- When the Dawn is Come
- Songs of Myself
- Lyrical Poems
- "The Golden Joy"
- "The Stars Stand Up in the Air"
- Thomas Campion and the Art of English Poetry
- Literature in Ireland (published posthumously)
