= Donagh MacDonagh =

Irish poet and playwright (1912–1968)

- Born: 22 November 1912; Dublin, Ireland
- Died: 1 January 1968 (aged 55); Dublin, Ireland
- Occupations: writer; judge; presenter; broadcaster; playwright

Donagh MacDonagh (22 November 1912 – 1 January 1968) was an Irish writer, judge, presenter, broadcaster, and playwright.

== Early life and education ==
MacDonagh was born in Dublin on St Cecilia's Day in 1912. He was still a young child when his father Thomas MacDonagh, an Irish nationalist and poet, was executed in 1916. His mother, Muriel Gifford, died of a supposed drowning, a year afterwards while swimming at Skerries to Shenick Island, County Dublin on 9 July 1917. The two children were then taken care of by their maternal aunts, in particular Catherine Wilson.

His parents' families then engaged in a series of custody lawsuits, as the MacDonaghs were Roman Catholic and the Giffords were Protestant; in the climate of Ne Temere and the Catholicism of both parents, the MacDonaghs were successful.

He and his sister Barbara (who later married actor Liam Redmond) lived briefly with their paternal aunt Eleanor Bingham, County Clare before being put into the custody of strangers until their late teens when they were taken in by Jack MacDonagh. He wrote a radio play, The Happy Day, about his time with Eleanor Bingham

MacDonagh was educated at Belvedere College and University College Dublin (UCD). At the latter institution he earned both a Bachelor of Arts and Master of Arts degrees and was a classmate with several writers who would achieve critical success, including Cyril Cusack, Denis Devlin, Charlie Donnelly, Brian O'Nolan, Niall Sheridan and Mervyn Wall. Donnelly and MacDonagh were said to have been close friends.

== Legal career ==
In 1935 MacDonagh was called to the Bar and practised on the Western Circuit.

In 1941 he was appointed a temporary District Justice in County Mayo. Per his son, Niall, he always doubted the validity of his appointment as the constitution made no allowance for a temporary justice. However, the constitution required ten years standing as a barrister or solicitor to be appointed and he had only seven. After reaching ten years he was appointed district justice in Wexford. To date, he remains the youngest person appointed as a judge in Ireland. He was Justice for the Dublin Metropolitan Courts at the time of his death. He served on the bench in County Wexford for many years, ending as a judge in Dublin up to his death.

== Writing career ==
In 1934 he and Niall Sheridan self-published Twenty Poems with each contributing ten poems. He published three volumes of poetry: "Veterans and Other Poems" (1941), The Hungry Grass (1947) and A Warning to Conquerors (1968). He also edited the Oxford Book of Irish Verse (1958) with Lennox Robinson.

He also wrote poetic dramas and ballad operas. One play, Happy As Larry, was translated into a number of languages. He had three other plays produced: God's Gentry (1951, a ballad opera about the tinkers), Lady Spider (1959, about Deirdre of the Sorrows and the Three sons of Ussna) and Step in the Hollow a piece of situation comedy nonsense.

He also wrote short stories; staged the first Irish production of Murder in the Cathedral with Liam Redmond, later his brother-in-law; and was a popular broadcaster on Radio Éireann.

== Personal life and death ==
He was married twice, to Maura Smyth and, following her death, to her sister, Nuala Smyth. He had four children, two with Maura, and two with Nuala.

He died on 1 January 1968 and is buried at Deans Grange Cemetery.

== Literature ==
=== Poetry collections ===
- 1934 - with Niall Sheridan. Twenty Poems. Self-published.
- 1941 - Veterans and Other Poems, Cuala Press, Dublin 1941
- 1947 - The Hungry Grass, Faber & Faber, London 1947
- 1954 - The Ballad of Jane Shore, Dolmen Press, Dublin 1954
- 1958 - The Oxford Book of Irish Verse: XVIIth Century - XXth Century, Clarendon Press, Oxford 1958 (editor with Lennox Robinson)
- 1969 - A Warning to Conquerors, Dolmen Press, Dublin 1969 (preface by Niall Sheridan)

=== Plays ===
- 1946 - Happy As Larry, Maurice Fridberg, London 1946
  A ballad opera. The most successful play in London in post-war years though produced unsuccessfully in New York in an elaborate production by Burgess Meredith. Has been translated into a number of languages
- 1951 - God's Gentry
  A ballad opera. Frequently acted but unpublished play about travellers (Belfast Arts Theatre, August 1951)
- 1957 - Step in the Hollow, Penguin 1959
  (A piece of situation comedy nonsense (Gaiety Theatre, 11 Mar. 1957))
- 1967 - Reprint of Happy as Larry by the Dolmen Press including a scene written after the initial publication.
- 1980 - Lady Spider, edited and annotated by Gordon M. Wickstrom, in Journal of Irish Literature, 9 (Sept. 1980), pp. 3–82
- (unpublished) - Lady Spider. About Deirdre of the Sorrows and the three sons of Uisnech

== Secondary literature ==
- Robert Hogan - After the Irish Renaissance -, 1986
- Desmond Ernest Stewart Maxwell – Modern Irish Drama 1891-1980 -, Cambridge 1985

== Bibliography ==
- Carl Edmund Rollyson, ed. (2018). "MacDonagh, Donagh". Critical Survey of Drama, Third Edition. Salem Press. pp. 2616–2622. ISBN 9781682176269.
