= Louise Gavan Duffy =

Irish nationalist

- Born: 17 July 1884; Cimiez, France
- Died: 12 October 1969 (aged 85); Dublin, Ireland
- Other name: Luíse Ghabhánach Ní Dhufaigh
- Education: University College Dublin
- Occupations: Educator, Suffragist, Nationalist
- Known for: Founding Ireland's first Gaelscoil

Louise Gavan Duffy (Irish: Luíse Ghabhánach Ní Dhufaigh; 17 July 1884 – 12 October 1969) was an educator, an Irish language enthusiast and a Gaelic revivalist, setting up the first Gaelscoil in Ireland. She was also a suffragist and Irish nationalist who was present in the General Post Office, the main headquarters during the 1916 Easter Rising.

Duffy was born in Nice, France, into an Anglo-Australian-Irish family. Her father, and later her brothers, were important figures in political and legal spheres in Ireland and Australia. She was raised in France in a well-to-do and culturally vibrant home where she was exposed to political figures and ideas.

She was one of the first women to graduate from University College Dublin, earning a Bachelor of Arts in 1911.

Her interest in women's suffrage and Irish nationalism led to close connections with those movements and with similarly minded women. She became a founding member of two of the country's paramilitary republican organisations for women, Cumann na mBan and Cumann na Saoirse. She was sent off to cook for the revolutionaries during the Irish Easter Rebellion in 1916.

As she became increasingly interested and competent in Irish, she eventually established the first secondary school through the medium of Irish Gaelscoil in 1917.

== Biography ==
Born in France, Louise Gavan Duffy was the daughter of the Irish nationalist Sir Charles Gavan Duffy, one of the founders of The Nation and his third wife, Louise (née Hall) from Cheshire, England. As a result of his activities as a nationalist, her father had been repeatedly tried for treason. He was elected to Westminster in 1852. Frustrated, he moved to Australia where he later became the 8th Premier of Victoria. He retired to France in 1880 where the warmer weather suited him.

Louise's mother died when she was four; she was then reared in Nice by her Australian half-sisters from her father's second marriage.

Louise's brother George Gavan Duffy, one of the signatories to the Anglo-Irish Treaty in 1921, was an Irish politician, barrister and judge. Her half-brother Sir Frank Gavan Duffy was the fourth Chief Justice of the High Court of Australia, sitting on the bench from 1913 to 1935. Another brother worked most of his life as a missionary in the French colony of Pondicherry.

=== Studies ===
Duffy's first visit to Ireland was in 1903, at the age of 18, when her father died and was buried in Glasnevin Cemetery. That was when she first heard Irish spoken; she found a grammar book in a bookshop and became curious, she would later write. Her father was not an Irish speaker, though her grandmother in the early 1800s should have been fluent.

She spent the years between 1903 and 1907 between France and England. She took courses through Cusack's College in London so that she could matriculate.

She decided to continue her studies in Dublin but could not afford to move until she received a small inheritance from her grandmother on the Hall side of the family. Once in Ireland in 1907, at the age of 23, she began her university studies, taking arts. She lived in the Women's College, Dominican Convent (as women were not allowed to attend lectures in the Royal University of Ireland). She went occasionally to the Gaeltacht to learn Irish. Graduating in 1911 with a Bachelor of Arts, from University College Dublin (NUI) she was one of the first women to do so.

Given the lack of teachers, even without a full qualification, she then taught in Patrick Pearse's St Ita's school for girls in Ranelagh. Duffy studied with the Dominicans again in Eccles Street, gaining a Teaching Diploma from Cambridge University.

=== Politics ===
A supporter of women's suffrage, Duffy spoke at a mass meeting in Dublin in 1912 in favour having of the Home Rule bill include a section to grant women the vote. She also joined the Irish republican women's paramilitary organisation Cumann na mBan, as a founding member in April 1914, serving on the provisional committee with Mary Colum, as a co-secretary.

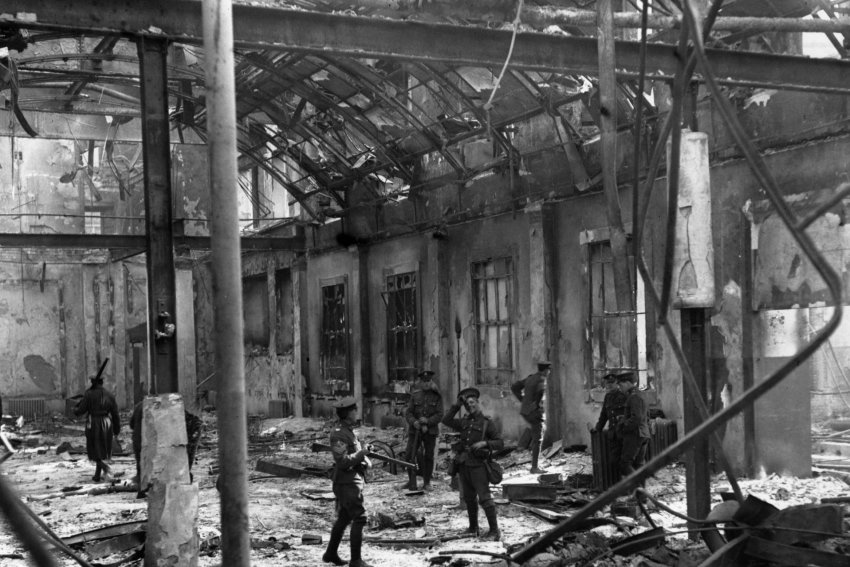
The interior of the GPO after the Rising

She was aware that being a suffragist and a nationalist were not necessarily the same thing, realising her involvement in Cumann na mBan was in support of nationalism. When St Ita's closed for funding problems in 1912, Duffy took the opportunity to complete her qualifications. After receiving her Cambridge teacher's diploma in 1913, she returned to UCD to study for a Master of Arts degree.

She was in fact working on her Master's thesis during the Easter break in 1916 when the rumour came to her that the Rising had begun in Dublin city centre. She walked to the Rebel headquarters in the GPO where she told Pearse, one of the leaders, that she did not agree with the violent uprising.

I was brought to Pearse and had the temerity to tell him that I thought the rebellion was very wrong as it would certainly fail but that I wished to be there if there was going to be anything doing.

She spent all of Easter week working in the GPO kitchens with other volunteers like Desmond FitzGerald and a couple of captured British soldiers, ensuring the volunteers were cared for. The women in the GPO were given the opportunity to leave under the protection of the Red Cross on the Thursday as the shelling of the building had caused fires but almost all of them refused. In the end the she was amongst the second group of the people to leave the GPO on the Friday, tunnelling through the walls of the buildings to avoid coming under fire.

Her group made it to Jervis Street Hospital where they spent the night. The next day, Saturday, Pearse formally surrendered. Duffy headed for Jacob's Biscuit Factory, another volunteer position, on the morning after the surrender, to see what was happening. There she found a hold out of volunteers who were unaware of the surrender or that the fighting was over.

After 1916 she was elected to the Cumann na mBan’s executive and in 1918 was one of the signatories to a petition for self-determination for Ireland which was presented to President Woodrow Wilson by Hanna Sheehy-Skeffington. During her time in the GPO, she had collected names of the volunteers and promised to take messages to their families. This may have influenced her in being involved in the National Aid Association and Volunteers Dependants Fund. In the aftermath of the rebellion there were 64 known dead among the volunteers, while 3,430 men and 79 women were arrested. Families needed support. These organisations were able to arrange funding from the USA.

=== Scoil Bhríde ===
In 1917 Duffy co-founded and ran Scoil Bhríde, as a secondary school (at that time) for girls in Dublin through the medium of Gaelic. It is still in operation as a primary school. Her co-founder was Annie McHugh who later married Ernest Blythe. The end of the Rising led to the Irish War of Independence. It was fought from 1919 to 1921. During this time, Duffy was mostly focused on the school. However, it was raided by the military and Duffy later admitted it was in fact used for rebel meetings and to safeguard documents. In October 1920, the Irish leader Michael Collins met Archbishop Patrick Clune there in secret. In an effort to support the nationwide boycott of the police - the Royal Irish Constabulary (RIC), in 1920 Duffy had a leaflet sent to all branches of Cumann na mBan which stated (in part) that the RIC were the "eyes and ears of the enemy. Let those eyes and ears know no friendship...".

The war ended with the Anglo-Irish Treaty in 1921. The result was the Irish Civil War which lasted until 1923. Duffy was a supporter of the Treaty, which her brother had signed, and as such she left Cumann na mBan and joined Cumann na Saoirse which she was instrumental in founding as an Irish republican women's organisation which supported the Pro-Treaty side.

Once the civil war was over, Duffy left the political arena and returned to education. She especially needed to focus on funding in the early years of the school. She worked with UCD's Department of Education from 1926, once Scoil Bhríde was recognised as a teacher training school. She published educational documents like School Studies in The Appreciation of Art with Elizabeth Aughney and published by UCD in 1932.

Until her retirement, she also lectured on the teaching of French. She retired as principal in 1944.

Once retired, she gave much of her time to the Legion of Mary and to an association which worked with French au pairs in Dublin. In 1948 she was awarded an honorary Doctorate of Laws by the National University of Ireland.

== Historical legacy ==
Recognising the importance of her first-hand experience and with a good political understanding, Duffy recorded her memories of the events in which she had taken part. In 1949, she gave an account of her life in relation to nationalist activities to the Bureau of Military History. She was involved in a Radio Éireann broadcast in 1956 about the women in the Rising. In 1962 she took part in the RTÉ TV program Self Portrait broadcast on 20 March 1962. In March 1966 she gave a lecture in UCD to mark the 50th anniversary of the Rising which was published in The Easter rising, 1916, and University College Dublin (1966).

In 2014, An Post issued a stamp to commemorate the centenary of the founding of Cumann na mBan. In 2016, for the centenary, a documentary was produced, discussing seven of the women, including Duffy, who were involved in the Easter rising.

Duffy died, unmarried, in 1969, aged 85, and was interred in the family plot in Glasnevin Cemetery.

== Bibliography ==
- Duffy, Louise Gavan (1916). The education of women in the early nineteenth century. Some French points of view. University College Dublin.
- Suenens, Léon Joseph; Duffy, Louise Gavan (1962). The Gospel to every creature. The Newman Press.
- Martin, Francis Xavier; Duffy, Louise Gavan; et al. (1966). The Easter rising, 1916 and University College, Dublin. University College Dublin.
- Duffy, Louise Gavan (1936). School studies in the appreciation of art. The Eucharistic mystery: Giotto-Tiepolo 1266-1770. University College Dublin.
- Cumann na mBan. To the president and houses of congress of the United States of America.
- Celia de Fréine Luíse Ghabhánach Ní Dhufaigh - Ceannrodaí (Comhar, 2018)
