= GPO nursing contingent =

The GPO nursing contingent was a group of twelve women, including members of Cumann na mBan - the republican women's organisation for Irish independence - who remained in the besieged G.P.O. building during the 1916 Easter Rising in Dublin and removed the wounded to hospital.

Many women of Cumann na nGaedheal, the Irish Citizen Army and Cumann na mBan provided support to republicans before and during the Rising. On Friday 28 April 1916, pinned down by the British Army and with a fire encroaching, Pádraig Pearse said that those not qualified in first aid should leave to avoid expected worse fighting. At 18:30, Joseph Plunkett gave the order to prepare the wounded republicans for removal. Volunteers were positioned in lanes and courtyards and passages had been knocked through houses by the hundreds of volunteers. Fr. John Flanagan, medical officer John Doyle and two medical students went with the women. The twelve, who had barely slept for days, carried the blanket-wrapped wounded through on stretchers. Sometimes under fire, they waited for a lull in the gunfire at the Coliseum theatre and passed quietly through an upper balcony. They went through the G.P.O. courtyard, and two volunteers helped them get through to Princes Street. To continue past a burning barricade at Williams Street, it was trampled somewhat and Fr. Flanagan led the way into Abbey Street holding a white flag with a red cross, whence they came under fire again. After resting, Fr. Flanagan and a prisoner, Dr. George Mahony, went to Jervis Street Hospital to seek admission. The group was escorted in at 23:30. Only the most-badly wounded were accepted. The women were allowed to sleep on a waiting room floor.

Early the following morning, the officer in charge said they could leave. At the Parnell Monument they were questioned, but they said they were Red Cross nurses from the hospital and were granted passage. They did not acknowledge volunteers at Rotunda Hospital for fear of exposure. Questioned again by detectives at Portland Row, they repeated their story before being allowed to pass and spend the night at the house of one of the women.

The twelve were:

- Aoife de Búrca
- Elizabeth “Lillie” Burke (née McGinty)
- Louise Gavan Duffy
- Lucy Smyth (née Byrne)
- Martha “Birdie” Walsh (née Slater)
- Molly Reynolds
- Margaret McElroy
- Mary Josephine “Mary Jo” Walsh (née Rafferty)
- Margaret Walsh (née Jenkins)
- Matilda “Tilly” Simpson
- Peggy Downie
- Stasia Byrne (née Toomey)
