= Brigid Foley =

Irish nationalist

- Born: 14 April 1887; Killeagh, Ireland
- Died: 28 June 1970 (aged 83); Wicklow, Ireland
- Other names: Brigid Martin, Brighid Foley

Brigid Foley (14 April 1887 – 28 June 1970) was an Irish nationalist and republican who was one of the five women in Lewes prison as a result of the Easter Rising of 1916.

== Early life ==
Born in 1887 in Killeagh in County Cork to Richard Foley and Margaret Long. Her parents were Irish speakers. When she was 15 Foley was sent to school in Dublin where she joined the Keating Branch of the Gaelic League. Her siblings were already members including Nora, Cait and Micheal. The family in Dublin was running the Foley Typewriter Trading Company.

In 1915 she joined Cumann na mBan, Central Branch. Foley was involved in all the usual activities of the organisation from learning First Aid and carrying messages to carrying guns where needed. She particularly worked as a go between from Seán Mac Diarmada to her brother who worked in Birmingham in munitions. She was also involved in the return of Liam Mellows from England where he had been deported. During Holy week Foley was sent to Cork with a written dispatches for Tomas McCurtain and a solicitor Mr Healy. Foley usually refused to know what was in the dispatches so she could better react when questioned by the British. On one of the trips to Cork she was searched and detained by the police but the failed to discover the dispatches she carried. She was followed to church but evaded the detectives and managed to get her charge to McCurtain's brother.

Séamus O'Connor asked Foley, with others, to transport guns stored in Arran road, Drumcondra, Dublin which needed to be moved. Kitty O'Doherty carried out the action once a number of women and men showed up to assist on the way to the location. Foley and Effie Taafe were then sent off leaving others to finally move the guns. On another occasion Foley was asked to transport sums of money for Séamus O'Connor.

== Revolution ==
Once the Easter Rising began and Foley had returned to the city she worked delivering messages from the General Post Office (GPO) around the city to the various leaders and then was sent to create a first aid station. Dr Touhy arrived with the first injured volunteer.

Foley was arrested on the day Tom Clarke was executed and sent to Kilmainham Gaol, after processing in the Ship Street Barracks and then Richmond Barracks, with many other women. The women spent several months in Mountjoy Prison. Foley was sent to HM Prison Lewes with four other women. She and Marie Perolz were released earlier than the rest of the women after the issue was raised in Parliament. It turned out that Foley was being charged in connection with the arms landing in Kerry. One her return to Ireland Foley began to arrange care packages for the men still held in prison. While in Kilmainham, Perolz attributed her survival to Foley as she had become very depressed listening to the executions of the leaders.

During the time she was in prison, Foley's sister continued to run the typewriting business though the offices were wrecked during the rising. Their landlord refused to take rent until Foley and her brother were released. While she was in prison in the UK she was visited by Alfie Byrne MP.

The five women in Lewes prison were Marie Perolz, Helena Molony, Nell Ryan, Winifred Carney and Foley.

After the prisoners were released there was very little activity until the Conscription Crisis of 1918. Foley was a member of the Phibsboro Committee of the anti-conscription organisation. That reinvigorated the sense of nationalism in Ireland. Foley was present at the opening of the Dail on 21 January 1919. She continued to run the family business and provided it, her car, and the offices to the volunteers whenever needed. Her business was repeatedly attacked during the Black and Tan period. She and her husband often hid people on the run while they were living in Dublin. They were present in Croke Park during the events of Bloody Sunday (1920). As a result of the raid on the family home and the arrest of her husband, Foley was instrumental in arranging an informant, John Reynolds, within the British troops.

Foley married Joseph J. Martin in June 1918. In 1925, with her husband, she moved to London. Martin died in 1963 and Foley died in 1970.
