= Linda Kearns MacWhinney =

Irish nurse and politician (1888–1951)

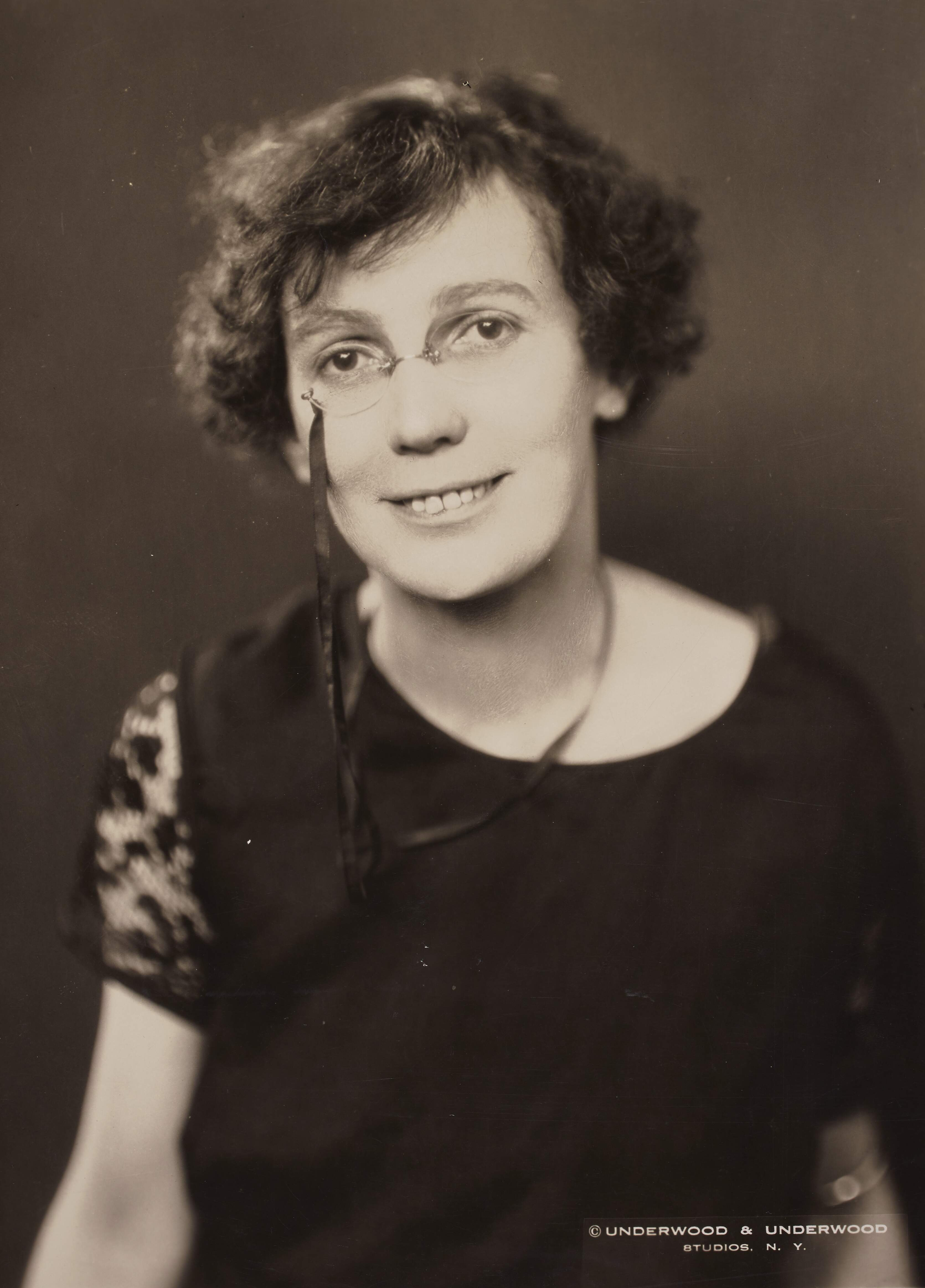
- Kearns in 1922

Senator
- In office 27 April 1938 – 7 September 1938
- Constituency: Industrial and Commercial Panel

Personal details
- Born: Linda Mary Kearns; 1 July 1888 Cloonagh, Dromard, County Sligo, Ireland
- Died: 5 June 1951 (aged 62) Dublin, Ireland
- Party: Fianna Fáil
- Spouse: Wilson Charles MacWhinney (m. 1929)
- Children: 1

Military service
- Branch/service: Cumann na mBan; Irish Republican Army
- Battles/wars: Irish War of Independence

Linda Mary Kearns MacWhinney (née Kearns; 1 July 1888 – 5 June 1951) was an Irish nurse and Fianna Fáil politician.

== Early life ==
Born in Cloonagh, Dromard, County Sligo, she was one of eight children born to Thomas and Catherine "Nora" (née Clarke) Kearns. From 1907, she studied and trained to be a nurse. Having joined Cumann na mBan shortly after its formation in 1914. She had not been interested in nationalism or republicanism prior to the Easter Rising and had intended to serve as a nurse in France during World War I until a chance meeting with Thomas MacDonagh changed her mind and radicalised her.

== Easter Rising ==
Two days after the insurgents seized the Dublin GPO during the Easter Rising in April 1916, Kearns, a nurse, took over an empty building on North Great George's Street. She hung a Red Cross flag above the door and welcomed casualties of the fighting, from both sides of the conflict. However, as she had treated republican volunteers during the uprising, the British Army ordered Kearns to close her unofficial hospital. She did so, with great reluctance.

== After the Rising ==
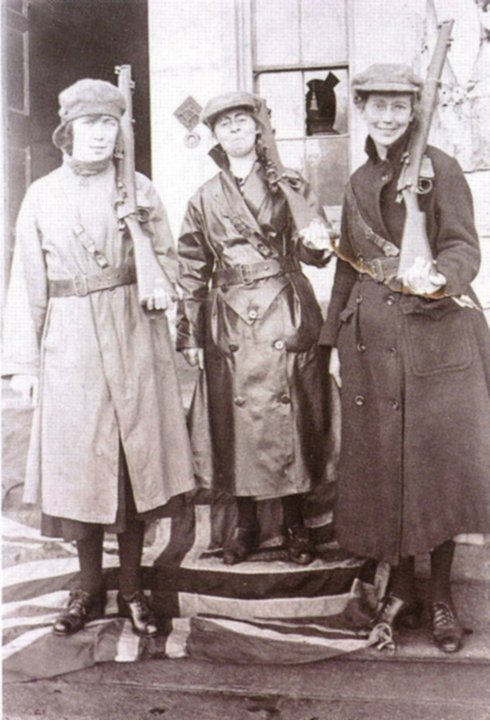
May Burke (left), Eithne Coyle (centre) and Linda Kearns (right) in Duckett’s Grove, Carlow, 1921, standing on the Union Jack. The photograph was taken shortly after their escape from Mountjoy

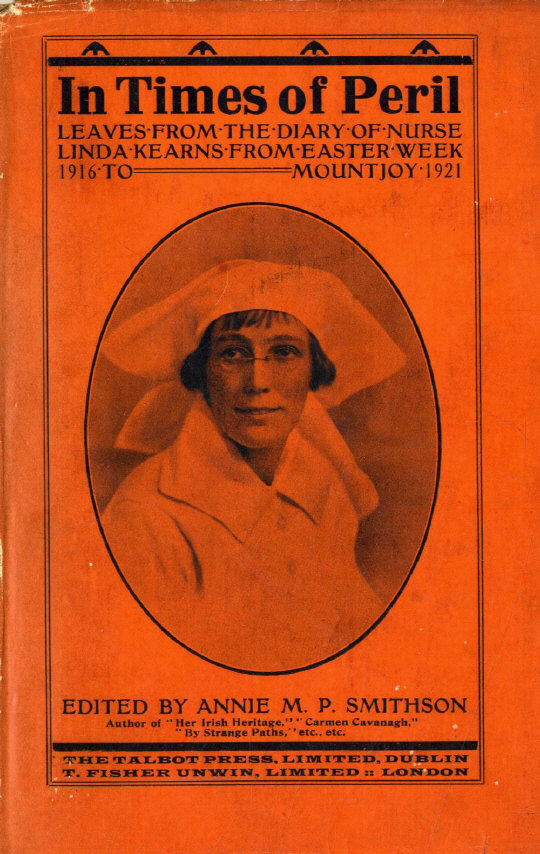
Kearns appearing on the cover of her book "In Times of Peril"

She realised she had skills that could be useful in times of war. After the Rising she went into private nursing. As a nurse she helped fight the 1918 Spanish flu epidemic on Achill Island. She was the nurse to the O'Connor Morris family in Tullamore and traveled extensively with them. After Maurice O'Connor Morris's death on 11 February 1916, he left Linda an inheritance of £2,500. She was able to purchase a car, which would later come in useful during the Irish War of Independence when she worked as a courier for Michael Collins transporting information and sometimes arms. Her status as a nurse helped her evade detection until she was caught in November 1920 in Sligo transporting firearms. The county inspector reported her arrest as follows:

On 20-11-20 a police and military patrol stopped a motor car driven by nurse Belinda Kearns of 29 Gardiner Place Dublin and found therein 10 service rifles, four revolvers, 403 rounds of service rifle ammunition, 23 rounds of revolver ammunition and a quantity of equipment. Two rifles, one revolver and part of the equipment have been identified as the property of the police who were murdered and robbed near Grange on 25-10-20. Three males suspects were being conveyed in the same motor car. All have been arrested and will be tried for murder...It has been ascertained that Miss Kearns has for the last two years been the medium of communications between Head Quarters IRA Dublin and County Sligo.

In a statement to the Bureau of Military History in 1950, Kearns alleged she was badly beaten during her arrest by a Black and Tan Officer, so much so she suffered permanent damage to her teeth. She was sentenced to 10 years imprisonment. She served time in a number of Irish prisons before being sent to Walton Prison in Liverpool, where she went on hunger strike.

From there she was sent to Mountjoy Prison. In October 1921, she famously escaped from Mountjoy Jail with three other women, Mae Burke, Eileen Keogh, and Eithne Coyle. The escape had been personally arranged by Michael Collins, and it made international headlines, featuring in the New York Times on 31 October 1921 under the heading "Four Women Break Jail".

Following their escape, Kearns and her fellow escapees split up and were taken to individual safe houses. However, they were each visited by a man calling himself Seamus Burke, who had previously visited them in Mountjoy claiming to be an IRA man, and were told they needed to be regrouped. The four were not long back together when they were notified in a message from Michael Collins that Seamus Burke was, in fact, a British spy who was trying to regroup them so that they could all be re-arrested together. They were ordered to immediately move to an IRA training camp in Duckett's Grove, County Carlow. The four women remained there until the signing of the Anglo-Irish Treaty.

During the Battle of Dublin (28 June to 5 July 1922) Kearns served as a nurse and was present at the death of Republican leader Cathal Brugha.

Her memoir, In Times of Peril, leaves from the Diary of Nurse Linda Kearns from Easter Week 1916 to Mountjoy 1921 was edited by Annie M.P. Smithson in 1922.

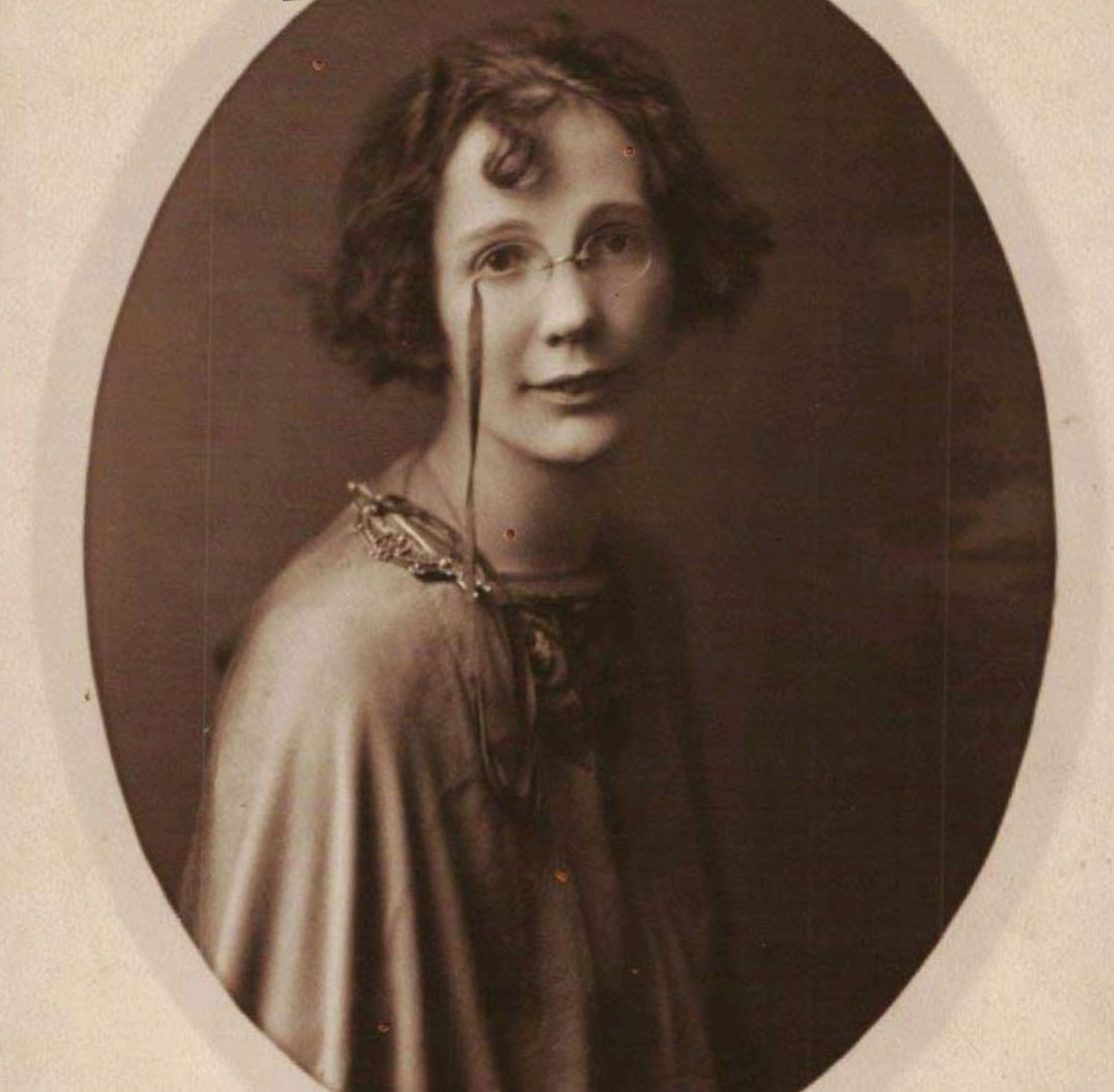
Photograph of Kearns in 1922, dressed in Gaelic attire. She often wore this while fundraising internationally.

In 1924–1925, she conducted a successful fundraising tour of Australia on behalf of Republican causes.

Linda Kearns was one of five women elected to the executive of Fianna Fáil when it was formed in 1926.

She was elected to Seanad Éireann on the Industrial and Commercial Panel in April 1938. She was defeated at the Seanad election of August 1938.

In May 1951 she was awarded the Florence Nightingale medal by the International Red Cross in recognition of her services to nursing.

== Personal life ==
She married Wilson Charles MacWhinney in 1929. MacWhinney was formerly a Commanding Officer in Derry Brigade IRA during the war of Independence before moving to Dublin in 1924. Together they had one daughter, Ann, in 1930.

== See also ==
- List of members of the Oireachtas imprisoned during the Irish revolutionary period
