= Honoria Aughney =

Irish republican activist and nationalist and Chief Medical Health Officer

- Born: Honoria Aughney; 13 September 1900; Tullow, County Carlow
- Died: 7 March 1991 (aged 90)

Honoria Aughney (13 September 1900 – 7 March 1991) was an Irish republican activist and nationalist and Chief Medical Health Officer for County Wexford.

== Life and career ==
Born Honoria Aughney to Patrick Aughney and MaryAnne Dargen of Roscat in Tullow, County Carlow. Her family were farmers and she was one of the younger of five girls and a boy. She was educated in University College Dublin where she completed her degree in medicine in the same class as Kevin Barry. Along with her sister Eilís Nic Eachnaidh she got involved in the Irish Nationalist organisation Cumann na mBan. Aughney was involved in the Irish War of Independence. She was a member of Cumann na mBan and on the executive leadership. She worked with her sister who founded the local branch of the cumann in Tullow and supported other Carlow branches. She accompanied Gerry McAleer when he brought the details of his last hours with Kevin Barry before the later's execution. She qualified with her MB BCh BAO in 1924 and went to work in Carlow until shortly after she qualified with her Diploma in Public Health in 1933. She went on to work in public health in Kildare in 1939 before being appointed Chief Medical Officer for County Wexford from 1949 to 1959 In the 50s Aughney was a member of the Bord na Radharcmhastóirí, the Irish Optometrists board. In 1961 Aughney was appointed to the Cancer Research Council. In 1963 at the annual conference she was a speaker for the British Geriatrics Society.

A journalist writing about her in the local paper in Wexford described her thus:

In her battles for public hygiene she had to deal with farmer lobbies, butchers lobbies, Dairymen’s lobbies, food chain lobbies and sanitary engineering lobbies to mention but a few. She faced them all down and cut the tripe out of the red necked bullies.

The current Tullow Tennis Club is located on a field donated to the young people of the area for sports use by Aughney.
