= Eilís Nic Eachnaidh =

Irish republican activist and nationalist

- Born: Elizabeth Aughney; 15 January 1898; Tullow, County Carlow
- Died: 21 May 1982 (aged 84); Terenure, Dublin
- Other name: Eilís Aughney

Eilís Nic Eachnaidh (15 January 1898 – 21 May 1982) was an Irish republican activist and nationalist.

== Early life ==
Born Elizabeth Aughney to Patrick Aughney and MaryAnne Dargen of Roscat in Tullow, County Carlow. Her family were farmers and she came in the middle of five girls and a boy. She was educated in University College Dublin where completed her teacher's diploma and got involved in the Irish Nationalist organisation Cumann na mBan partly through the advice of her mentor, Professor Boden. She joined with her sister Dr Honoria Aughney.

== Nationalism ==
Nic Eachnaidh was involved in the Irish War of Independence. She was a member of Cumann na mBan and on the executive leadership. She founded the local branch of the cumann in Tullow and supported other Carlow branches. In September 1920, Nic Eachnaidh began working as an Irish, History and Geography teacher in Scoil Bhride in St. Stephen's Green. She was working for Louise Gavan Duffy at the time. She also became a member of the executive of Cumman na mBan then. During the period when she was working in Dublin at school, Nic Eachnaidh worked for the executive of the organisation and ran drills on first aid. Once the school was on holidays Nic Eachnaidh would travel either to locations which needed support or home to Carlow where she would ensure the coordination of the Carlow branches. Like all the women involved in the war, Nic Eachnaidh carried messages, hid and transported weapons and provided first aid services. Once the truce came into effect Nic Eachnaidh was one of the women against the acceptance of the articles of the Anglo-Irish Treaty she remained a believer in the idea of an independent Republic and she continued her activities in opposition to the Free State.

In the aftermath of the Irish Civil War, Nic Eachnaidh remained involved working for pensions for those who had been in the various forces as well as looking for support for those prisoners who had been members of the IRA. Nic Eachnaidh was also chair of the Agricultural Wages Board from 1937.

She died in Dublin on 21 May 1982.
