= Elizabeth Bloxham =

Irish feminist and suffragist (1877 - 1962)

- Born: 8 July 1877; Claremorris, Ireland
- Died: 23 January 1962 (aged 84); Dublin, Ireland
- Known for: National Organiser for Cumann na mBan

Elizabeth "Bessie" Bloxham (8 July 1877 – 23 January 1962) was an Irish feminist and suffragist, serving as the national organizer for Cumann na mBan in the lead up to the 1916 Easter Rising and up through the Irish War of Independence.

== Life and work ==
Known as Bessie to her friends, Bloxham was born in Claremorris, County Mayo, the daughter of John Bloxham and Bridget McGreal on 8 July 1877. Her father was a Royal Irish Constabulary officer and she was raised in a Protestant household in Westport, County Mayo. She qualified as a Domestic Economy Instructress and initially worked in the north of Ireland. A friend of Mary Maguire, Bloxham acted as her bridesmaid when she married the poet Padraic Colum in 1912.

== Political life ==
In her late teenage years she began to read and then later contribute to Arthur Griffith's United Irishman afterwards writing for Sinn Féin. She usually signed her contributions as 'Eilís' (Irish for Elizabeth) or 'E.B.'.

Bloxham was well known in Ireland as a suffragette. She was a supporter of the Irish Women's Franchise League. She was a Gaelic League member. Bloxham was one of the founding members of the women's paramilitary organisation Cumann na mBan in April 1914. She was selected as a national organiser. As a teacher she was free during her holidays and spent them travelling around Ireland founding local branches. Her selection for this role was due to her background as a public speaker at literary and suffragette meetings. She was working in Newtownards during the Easter Rising itself and could only get reports of events.

In the summer of 1916, after the Rising and executions were over Bloxham was dismissed from her position in Newtownards. In previous years she had been asked to stay and given enticements to do so. She believed that it was her outspoken support of the Volunteers while working in such a strongly unionist area that prompted her dismissal. She was given a reference which bore testimony to her ability as a teacher and her power of organization. Her time in the north of the country had confirmed her belief that history and education were essential but that the culture lead to the unionists to be less accepting of their nationalist compatriots.

Of her family's response to her politics:

My brother's reply was, "Hasn't she as good a right to her own opinions as we have". That was the general attitude of the family.

After the rising she continued working with Cumann na mBan and was a signatory to the letter addressed to the President and the Houses of Congress of the United States of America asking for recognition of the Irish Republic. She didn't remain in Newtownards and worked in Wexford as a teacher for most of her life, continuing to be vocal about feminism and nationalism. She resigned from the National Executive because 'she disapproved of the shooting of policemen', according to Eileen McCarville's statement to the Bureau of Military History. Her brother, RIC Sergeant Henry J. Bloxham, was killed in 1921 in an ambush near Waterfall, County Cork.

== Legacy ==
Bloxham's statements, reports and writings about the era give an insight into the views of the people involved, Protestant and Catholic, Northern and Southern. She retired from teaching in 1944. Once retired she moved to Dublin and was living there when she documented her participation in the nationalist movement. She died in January 1962 and is buried in St Andrews Church Malahide.
