= Máire Comerford =

Irish republican (1893–1982)

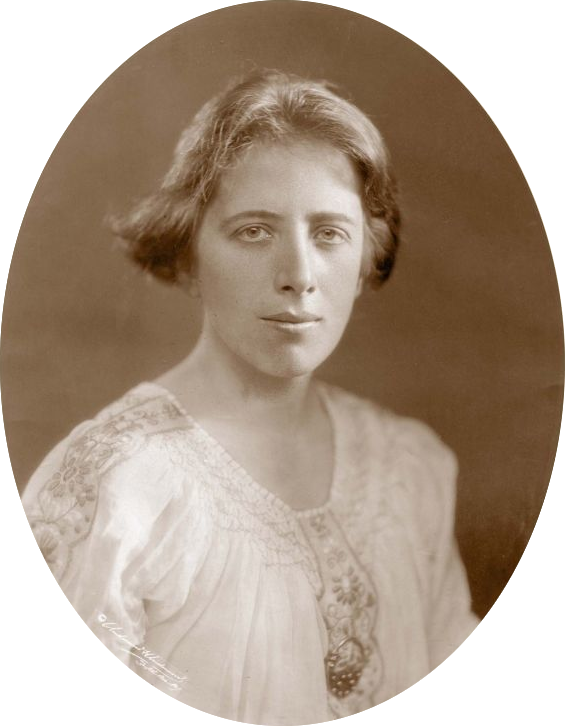
- Comerford in December 1923
- Born: Mary Eva Comerford; 2 June 1893; Rathdrum, County Wicklow, Ireland
- Died: 15 December 1982 (aged 89)
- Resting place: Mount Saint Benedict Cemetery in Gorey, County Wexford
- Known for: Cumann na mBan activities

Mary Eva Comerford (2 June 1893 – 15 December 1982) was an Irish republican from County Wexford. As a member of Cumann na mBan she witnessed the events of 1916 to 1923 and took an active part in the Irish War of Independence. She opposed the Anglo-Irish Treaty of 1921. During the Irish Civil War she fought against the Irish Free State, being imprisoned and wounded by gunfire, and went on hunger strike. She was later a journalist for The Irish Press. Comerford remained an opponent of partition and the Free State until her death. Her memoir of the Irish revolutionary period, On Dangerous Ground, was published posthumously in 2021. The British newspaper, The Daily Mail, called her "the Jeanne d'Arc of the Republican cause".

== Early life ==
Comerford (centre) with other Cumann na mBan women circa 1920

Comerford was born on 2 June 1893 in Rathdrum, County Wicklow. Her parents were James Comerford, a flour and corn miller who owned the Comerford Mill, and Eva Mary Esmonde. She had two brothers (Thomas and Alexander) and one sister (Dymphna). Her maternal grandfather, Thomas Esmonde, had been awarded a V.C. for bravery in the Crimean War in 1854. On his return to Ireland he joined the Royal Irish Constabulary and was promoted to deputy chief inspector. She and her siblings were sent to a convent school in Athlone where she was instructed in Irish history and the Irish language. Comerford was a horse rider and cyclist, showing the same courage and recklessnesses in each.

Her father died when she was 16 and in 1911 she was sent to London to a secretarial school. During this time she stayed in the Ladies Club in Eccles Place. She returned to Ireland to live with her mother in the home of her uncle in Wexford, T.L. Esmonde. Around 1915, her mother rented a house in Courtown, County Wexford, to set up a school.

== Early revolutionary period ==
Comerford was in Dublin during the outbreak of the Easter Rising in Dublin and volunteered to aid Countess Markievicz in St Stephen's Green, but her offer was not accepted. She carried despatches for the GPO garrison. Comerford returned to Gorey after the Rising and joined the local Sinn Féin branch where she worked alongside Sean Etchingham.

She supported the prisoners who had been interned in 1916 and the reorganisation of the Sinn Féin party that began in 1917. Following Markievicz's release from captivity in England and triumphal tour around Dublin in June 1917, Comerford met her in Liberty Hall. Comerford returned to Dublin shortly before the 1918 general election, where she worked on Roger Sweetman's election campaign. On 21 January 1919 she attended the Round Room at the Mansion House, witnessing the creation of the First Dáil by the 27 TDs present. Years later Comerford recalled the importance of that date:

No day that ever dawned in Ireland had been waited for, worked for, suffered for like that January Tuesday. People waiting asked one another 'Did you ever think you and I would live to see this day'...Never was the past so near, or the present so brave, or the future so full of hope. We did see Cathal Brugha presiding and we repeated the words of the Declaration after him, and felt we had burnt our boats now. There was no turning back.

From the summer of 1919 until after the signing of the treaty Comerford worked as secretary to nationalist historian and author Alice Stopford Green and lived in her house at no. 90 St Stephen's Green, in central Dublin. In 1920 she was sent to County Leitrim to work with local IRA leadership on organisational matters. In Leitrim Comerford started multiple Cumann Na mBan branches. New members were instructed in first aid, care and safety of arms, dispatch work and intelligence collection.

Comerford assisted the IRA in the Dublin area during the Irish War of Independence. Because they were less likely to be searched, Cumann na mBan members often moved weapons through crowded areas in broad daylight: "Dumps were moved where necessary and I learned from experience that the Lee Enfield service rifle could be carried under my coat without protruding at the bottom if the muzzle was held under my ear". She also helped to run the Irish White Cross, led by the Quaker James Douglas, which aimed to assist civilian war victims by raising money in the United States. With the approval of the Anglo-Irish Treaty on 7 January 1922, the terms of which "horrified" republicans like her, Comerford resigned from her position in Dáil Éireann. In the lead up to the 1922 Irish general election she was involved in raids of multiple post offices where stamps were taken and used to pay for campaign telegrams and cash payments for election costs.

== Civil war ==
Comerford was one of the Cumann na mBan members that voted overwhelmingly against the terms of the Treaty and wanted to maintain the Irish Republic. During the Battle of Dublin in June and early July 1922, she was spotted cycling through the midst of the fighting in Sackville Street. Comerford took the battle to the Free State, with one British newspaper observing that she was "one of the new women Republicans whose aggressive methods have overshadowed women like Miss MacSwiney and her sister" and that her "magnetic personality" helped galvanise "apathetic Republicans into active fighters". In June 1922, she managed to escape from the Four Courts during the Battle of Dublin. In August 1922 her work took her very close to where Michael Collins had been assassinated the previous evening.

In January 1923 Comerford was involved in a plan to kidnap William Cosgrave, the leader of the Irish Free State. Comerford and the IRA leader Patrick McGrath were arrested and the plot was cancelled. Comerford was charged with possession of a revolver and held at the women's section of Mountjoy Prison. While there she was shot in the leg by a Free State soldier as she was waving at fellow women prisoners in the exercise yard (which was forbidden). Comerford was held in solitary confinement for three months "because of her defiant attitude".

On 23 March 1923 the female prisoners in Mountjoy were scheduled to be transferred to a separate women's prison, the North Dublin Union (NDU). The prisoners resisted being searched before their transfer and were met with violence. Comerford was badly beaten and received stitches to the head, while others were subject to beatings and humiliations and some were thrown down flights of stairs.

While being held in NDU Comerford was one of 50 women that took part in the 1923 Irish Hunger Strikes to protest against their continued imprisonment long after the end of the civil war. Comerford escaped the NDU and was free for a month before being recaptured and imprisoned at Kilmainham Jail, where she again went on hunger strike. After 27 days she was released and recuperated in a Dublin nursing home.

== Post-civil war ==
For the election of August 1923, Comerford was sent to canvass in County Cork. She drove a motorbike paid for from republican funds and accused the Free State authorities of "massive intimidation" on election day. In December, using a false passport under the name "Edith Lewis", she went to America at Éamon de Valera's suggestion to raise money for the republican cause; she spent nine months in the USA.

Comerford supported de Valera's early abstentionist republican candidates, but split with him when he entered the Dáil in 1927. In 1926 he had established the Fianna Fáil party, which drew off a number of Cumann na mBan supporters and weakened it thereafter. Comerford remained a member of what was from then on generally seen as a committed group which would not compromise on accepting the border. In her opinion Ireland had not achieved freedom: "if someone is handcuffed to another person, are they free?"

From 1935 to 1964, despite her differences with de Valera, she worked as a journalist at his newspaper The Irish Press. During "The Emergency", the Irish Directorate of Military Intelligence was concerned about The Irish Press employing Comerford. Colleagues recalled her as "a grannywoman figure in the newsroom".

== Later life ==
In 1967 Comerford worked on the restoration of the Tailors' Hall in Dublin, which had housed Wolfe Tone's nascent republican parliament in the 1790s, with the Irish Georgian Society. In 1969 her book, The First Dáil, was published by Joe Clarke. In later years she felt that de Valera's suggestion, made in America in 1919-20, that Ireland's future relationship to Britain would be about the same as that of Cuba to the USA had started the mentality of compromise that led to the Treaty.

In the 1970s and up to her death she supported the IRA's campaign in Northern Ireland, in particular its hunger strike campaign. In 1976 she was interviewed for the Curious Journey television documentary with other survivors of the 1914-23 period. These interviews were later published as a book titled Curious Journey. An Oral History of Ireland's Unfinished Revolution (1982).

Brian Harrison recorded an oral history interview with Comerford, in July 1977, as part of the Suffrage Interviews project, titled Oral evidence on the suffragette and suffragist movements: the Brian Harrison interviews. Comerford discussed Irish nationalism and the women's movement, including the involvement of Hanna Sheehy-Skeffington.

== Death and legacy ==
Comerford, who never married, died on 15 December 1982, aged 89. She was buried in Mount Saint Benedict Cemetery in Gorey, County Wexford.

In 2021, her memoir, edited by Hilary Dully and published by Lilliput Press, was published as On Dangerous Ground, a Memoir of the Irish Revolution. In it Comerford expressed her feelings about the Partition of Ireland:

The partition of our island has made it impossible for our nation to grow and mature, as modern democratic states should be free to do. My earnest wish, that the partition of Ireland will end, remains intact. Everything I have observed in Ireland since 1923, north and south, only strengthens this belief.

== Archives ==
Comerford's papers are held at two Dublin libraries:

- NLI: MS 21,939-21,940
- UCD: IE UCDA LA18

== Bibliography ==
- The First Dáil, January 21st 1919 (1969). Dublin: Joe Clarke
- Curious Journey. An Oral History of Ireland's Unfinished Revolution (1982). London: Hutchinson (interviews with Tom Barry, Máire Comerford, Seán Harling, Seán Kavanagh, David Neligan, John L O'Sullivan, Joseph Sweeney, Brigid Lyons Thornton and Martin Walton)
- On Dangerous Ground, a Memoir of the Irish Revolution (2021). Edited by Hillary Dully. Dublin: Lilliput Press
