= Rose McNamara =

Irish nationalist and republican

Rose McNamarra
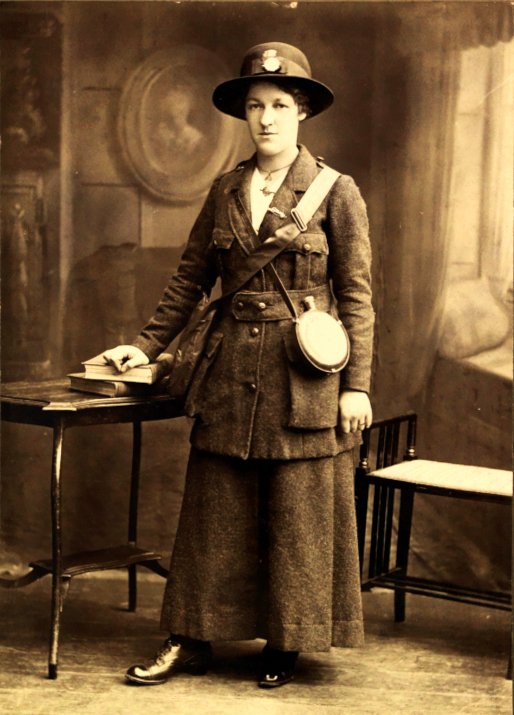
- Rose McNamara in uniform, c. 1916
- Born: Rose McNamara; 10 September 1885; Dublin, Ireland
- Died: 6 March 1957 (aged 71); Dublin, Ireland

Rose McNamara (10 September 1885 – 6 March 1957) was an Irish nationalist, republican, and Vice Commandant during the Easter Rising of 1916.

== Early life ==
Rose Anne McNamara was born to Benjamin McNamara, a van driver, and Johanna Mangan, at 8 Denmark Street, Dublin, on 10 September 1885. Her father died in 1898. Rose was just 15.

Marie Perolz introduced McNamara to Inghinidhe na hÉireann around 1906. Perolz's sister Delia was her sister in law. Delia was married to Matthew McNamara. McNamara joined Sinn Féin and became a member of Cumann na mBan when that formed out of the Inghinidhe na hÉireann. With them she marched in public parades, conducted demonstrations, learned to make field dressings and collected money for ammunition and equipment for the Irish Volunteers.

== Revolution ==
On Good Friday 1916, in preparation for the Easter Rising McNamara and others of the Cumann made field dressings. On the Monday her branch from Cumann na mBan were matched in full uniform to Emerald Square where they were given their instructions from Éamonn Ceannt. Rose served as Vice Commandant of the group who served in the Marrowbone Lane garrison, which was based in Jameson's Distillery.

She spent the Rising with a number of roles, working as quartermaster for the men, acting as a spotter for the snipers and ensuring nursing facilities for the wounded. On Sunday, April 30 they were told of the surrender. McNamara, refused the opportunity to leave as part of the women who were considered less important to the British accepting the surrender and she and the rest of the Cumann na mBan marched between the male Volunteers and were duly arrested and imprisoned.

“On the route to Richmond Barracks we were right behind Commandant Thomas McDonagh and Major McBride. When we reached somewhere about Kilmainham, both Major McBride and T. McDonagh said: "That's right, girls, sing away" and Major McBride said to me: "Sing away, girls. You'll be alright. You'll be out tomorrow", and I replied "and what about you" meaning all the men. He said, very sadly, "Ah no. We won't be out. We'll be shot".

While they were in prison in Kilmainham Gaol they could hear the men being executed by firing squad as McBride had predicted.

In the aftermath the members of the Cumann were disheartened but collected funds for the prisoner's dependents. In 1917 McNamarra was First Lieutenant of her branch. Military drills and training began again. In 1918 the branch, including McNamara were involved in the anti-conscription activities.

During the Irish War of Independence McNamara worked with the other women in collecting funds, attending funerals and other parades and in protesting at the gaols where prisoners were on hunger-strike. in 1919 McNamara became Captain of her Cumann na mBan branch. Her role was to ensure nursing cover at first aid stations during planned ambushes. She was notified in advance to make sure the house was ready to receive any wounded men. Commandant Joe O'Connor and Seán Guilfoyle were working with her on these.

In the Irish Civil War she served under Countess Markievicz. She attended the events at the Four Courts where the Pro and Anti Treaty sides clashed. McNamara was on the Anti-Treaty side. She procured refreshments for the men and carried messages for them. The following day she was given orders to serve at the United Services Club. Fighting continued in the city over night.

Rose McNamara died 6 March 1957.
