= Lucy Agnes Smyth =

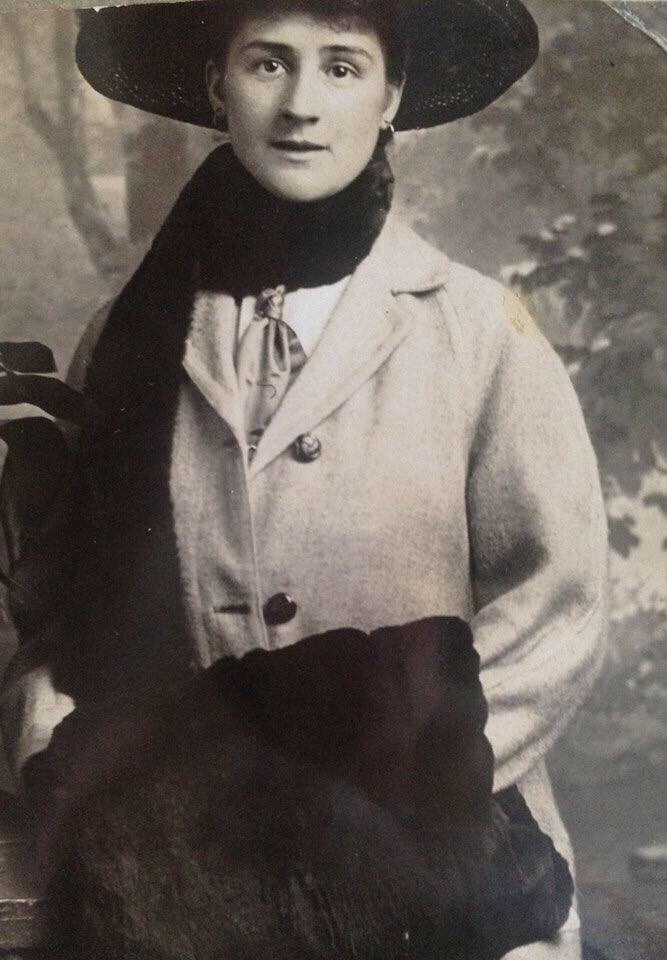
- Born: 26 September 1882; Dublin, Ireland
- Died: 1972 (aged 89–90); Dublin
- Resting place: Glasnevin cemetery
- Years active: 1914-1921
- Known for: Political Activism and involvement in the 1916 Rising
- Movement: Cumann na mBan
- Spouse: Thomas Byrne
- Children: Sheila O'Leary
- Parent(s): James Peter Joseph Smyth, Mary Anne Smyth

Lucy Agnes Smyth Byrne (1882–1972) was an officer in Cumann na mBan, an Irish republican women's paramilitary organisation, during the time of the 1916 Easter Rising. She played a prominent role in the organisation as she was the section leader of its Central branch, and eventually in later years became its 1st Lieutenant.

== Early life ==
Lucy Agnes Smyth was born on 26 September 1882 at 107 Capel Street in Dublin. Her father James Peter Joseph Smyth was a brassfounder and her mother Mary Anne Smyth was a housekeeper. According to the 1901 census, Lucy was living with her family in Amiens Street. She was 18 and her occupation was listed as Millinery Saleswoman - at that point she was living with her parents, her sister Isabella (28) and her brother James Leo (20). At the time of the 1911 census, by which point her father had died, Lucy's parents had 9 children, 5 of which were still living - Lucy being the youngest. When Lucy's father died, her brother James Leo became head of the house. When they moved to the residence in Rutland Square, Rotunda, Dublin Lucy became a member of the local St. Mary's Parish in Rotunda West, Dublin. Lucy Smyth was also a fluent Irish speaker. At the time of the 1911 census her occupation was a typist.

Thomas F. Byrne and Smyth married on 28 April 1919. Shortly after they married they moved to Upper Eccles Street opposite the Mater Hospital. Early in 1920, Smyth and Byrne's first child died after a raid by the Black and Tans where Byrne was arrested and jailed. The couple were involved in the War of Independence. Her daughter Sheila wrote regarding her birth, "I should have been born in 1922, but my mother fell under the cat and I came early".

In a witness statement by Elizabeth Colbert, sister of Conn Colbert who was executed in 1916, she describes her encounter with Smyth and her brother's love for Smyth. After her brother's execution, Elizabeth visited her house and Smyth showed her the letters she had received from Colbert. Elizabeth then quickly learned of her brother's love for Smyth, he described her as "the nicest girl in Dublin". Elizabeth then claimed that her brother would have married her had he not been executed. Father O’Mahony, a local parish priest, informed Smyth of a package that Conn Colbert had handed him to be delivered to Smyth. Smyth never received the package and went with Elizabeth to visit O’Mahony. He told Smyth that a young girl had offered to deliver it to her, he presumed she was a member of Cumann na mBan and that her last name was "Mc Namara". However, the parcel was never found as they were unable to trace its whereabouts. This was a big disappointment for both Smyth and Elizabeth Colbert. Conn Colbert was a rival of Smyth's husband, Tom Byrne.

== Role in Cumann na mBan and the Rising ==
Cumann na mBan (Women's League) was formed in April 1913, and was known widely as the female version of the Irish volunteers. In 1913, a number of women decided to hold a meeting in Wynne's Hotel for the purpose of discussing the possibility of forming an organization for women who would work in conjunction with the recently formed Irish Volunteers. Cumann na mBan was the main female support organization working for the success of Sinn Féin in the election. On 4 April, Cumann na mBan was launched at a meeting held in the Pillar Room in the Mansion House.

During the years 1914–1921, Smyth was heavily involved in the activities of Cumann na mBan. On Easter Monday in 1916, Smyth (aged 34 at the time) played a dangerous role of carrying the arms from a house prior to it being raided. The following day she was given the task of carrying vital messages to the GPO while also being a member of the first aid department.

On 23 April 1916, the Military Council of the Irish Republican Brotherhood finalized arrangements for the Easter Rising, it included Cumann na mBan, along with the Irish Volunteers and Irish Citizen Army, into the Army of the Irish Republic. Patrick Pearse was appointed overall Commandant-General and James Connolly as Commandant-General of the Dublin Division. The day of the rising, forty Cumann na mBan members including Smyth herself entered the General Post Office (GPO) on O'Connell Street, Dublin with their male counterparts. They came to the site armed.

As a member in the first aid movement, she attended to the wounded in the Hibernian Bank and the GPO. Smyth continued to risk her life by helping carry injured Volunteers to Jervis Street Hospital despite the ongoing fighting being in very close proximity. She also nursed James Connolly.

When the call came to rise, Byrne and fifteen volunteers in Maynooth marched to Dublin. Their feet were swollen from their long journey and Smyth offered Byrne a bowl of warm water to ease the pain. Later Byrne gave his future wife his watch and money for safe-keeping.

Smyth's daughter Sheila O'Leary was one of the few people, and probably the only one left alive, whose parents were both in the GPO during Easter 1916. Smyth was awarded four medals, as well as the medal given to survivors on the 50th anniversary. Smyth was considered as an "ordinary" person who did extraordinary things.

== Death ==
Smyth died at the age of 90, in November 1972. She is buried in Glasnevin cemetery in Dublin. She is buried along with her husband and son. Tom Byrne died 7 September 1962 aged 85 years old. Myles Byrne died in 1968 at the age of 41.

== Bibliography ==
- Chumhaill, E. N. (2014, 2 April). History of Cumann Retrieved from http://www.anphoblacht.com/contents/23897
- Colbert, E. M. (1916). BUREAU OF MILITARY HISTORY, 1913-21 STATEMENT BY WITNESS. Bureau of Military History.
- Collins, L. (2012). Poetry by Women in Ireland: A Critical Anthology 1870-1970. Liverpool: Liverpool University Press.
- CSO. (2015). Central Statistics Office . Retrieved from Central Statistics Office : www.cso.ie
- Find a Grave. (2011). Lucy Agnes Smyth Byrne ( - 1972) - Find A Grave Memorial. Retrieved 10 22, 2015, from Findagrave.com: https://www.findagrave.com/memorial/80262063
- Good, J. (1946). Inside the GPO 1916. Dublin: O'Brien Press.
- "OBITUARY: MRS. LUCY BYRNE". The Irish Times. 16 November 1972. p. 9. ProQuest 526483950.
- Matthews, A. (2010). Renegades - Irish Republican Women 1900-1922. Cork: Mercier Press. Matthews, A. (2014). The Irish Citizen Mercier Press.
- McGreevy, Ronan (13 July 2015). "'When I think back, they were so brave and so courageous. They put their country first': Sheila O'Leary is one of a rare few whose parents were in the GPO in 1916". Irish Times. p. 8. ProQuest 1695639402.
- Stories from 1916. (2015, 13 September). Byrne the "Boer" and the Nicest girl in Dublin- Tom and Lucy. Retrieved from Stories from 1916: http://www.storiesfrom1916.com/1916-easter-rising/tom-and-lucy-byrne
