= Eithne Coyle =

Irish republican activist

- Eithne Ní Chumhaill
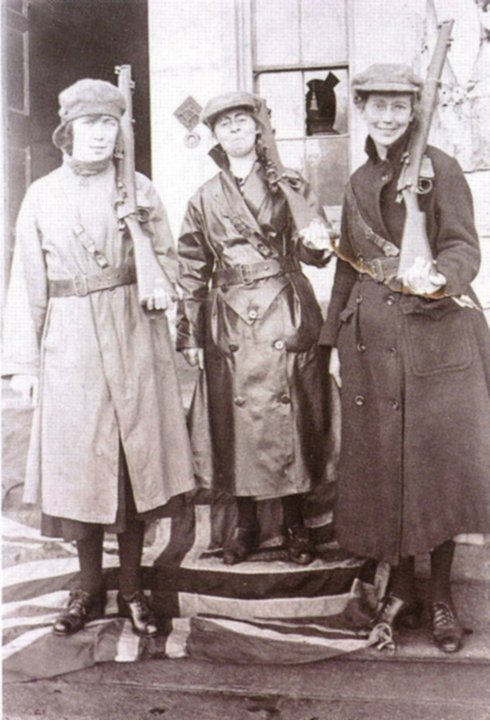
- Cumann Na mBan members May Burke (left), Eithne Coyle/Eithne Ní Chumhaill (centre) and Linda Kearns (right) in Duckett’s Grove, Carlow, 1921, standing on the Union Jack

President of Cumann na mBan
- In office 1926–1941
- Preceded by: Constance Markievicz
- Succeeded by: Margaret Langsdorf

Personal details
- Born: Annie Coyle; 3 January 1897 Killult, County Donegal, Ireland
- Died: 5 January 1985 (aged 88) Dalkey, Dublin, Ireland
- Other political affiliations: Republican Congress (1934)
- Spouse: Bernard O'Donnell (m. 1935; died 1968)
- Occupation: Political Activist

Military service
- Allegiance: Irish Republic
- Branch/service: Cumann na mBan
- Battles/wars: Irish War of Independence; The Troubles in Ulster (1920–1922); Irish Civil War

Eithne Coyle (1897–1985; Irish: Eithne Ni Cumhaill) was an Irish republican activist. She was a leading figure within Cumann na mBan (women's paramilitary organisation) and a member of the Gaelic League. However, her role in the period now known as 'revolutionary Ireland' (c. 1912 – c. 1924) was more extensive than her membership of these two groups indicates. A letter from Peader O'Donnell dated 19 April 1945 in support of her application for a military service application noted she was targeted severely during the Irish Civil War by the Irish Free State forces who 'regarded her more as an IRA officer than as Cumann na mBan organiser, which indeed she was'. She would also become notorious for her involvement in two high-profile prison escapes in the 1920s.

== Early years ==
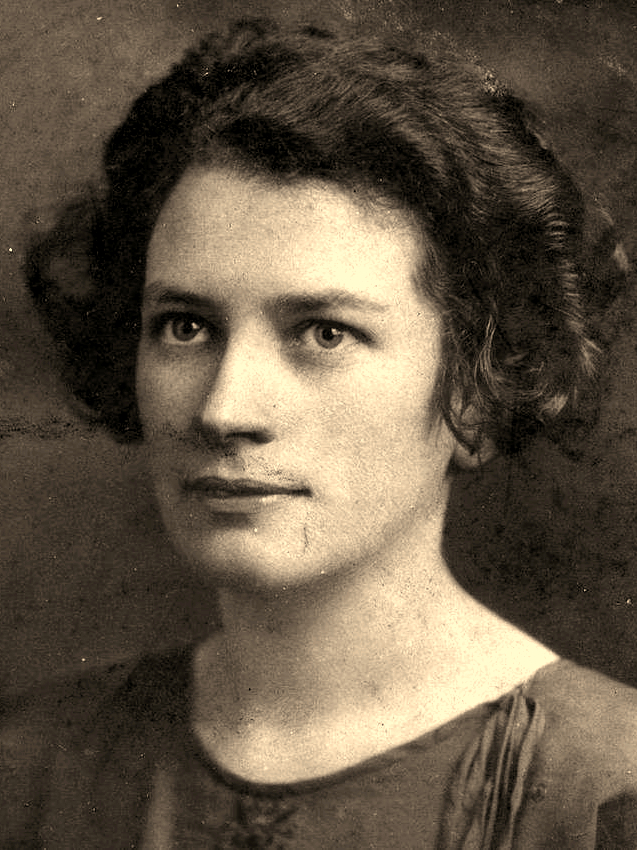
Coyle, circa 1920s

She was born as Annie Coyle on 3 January 1897 in Killult, a village near Falcarragh, County Donegal, to Charles Coyle and May McHugh (the youngest of their seven children). Her brother Donal Coyle served as Commandant in the 1st Northern Division of the Irish Volunteers. She joined Cumann na mBan in 1917 and became active in fundraising and anti-conscription campaigns. Her father died at the young age of 36, a misfortune that Coyle attributed to the pressures of dealing with unscrupulous landlords who evicted her family from their lands. She notes in her private papers that it was during this fraught childhood that she first met Maud Gonne 'who dazzled everyone by her beauty, charm, and humility'. For periods in the 1890s, Gonne campaigned in Donegal for tenant farmers' rights.

== Growth in the movement ==
As head of the County Donegal branch of Cumann na mBan, Coyle played a leading role in mobilizing her members to canvass on behalf of Sinn Féin for the 1918 general election. Between 1918 and 1919 she lived for a time in Dungannon as a Gaelic League organizer before moving to County Longford to set up Cumann na mBan branches. She subsequently became Gaelic League organiser in County Roscommon.

During the Irish War of Independence whilst Coyle was based in the Longford-Roscommon area she became a close comrade of the local Irish Republican Army (IRA), providing them with sketches of a local police station that she knew. Regularly harassed by Black and Tans in Roscommon, with her house twice wrecked by members of the organisation, she was arrested on New Years Day 1921 and subsequently sentenced in February 1921 to three years penal servitude for aiding IRA members. In keeping with Cumann na mBan policy, she refused to recognize the court during her trial. She noted in her private papers, 'I read a newspaper during the whole comedy and only raised my eyes once to tell the presiding officer that he was wasting his precious time, as I did not recognise his sham court, as I spoke Irish one of the police had to translate my seven words of wisdom.'

She first recalled seeing Constance Markievicz at Mountjoy Prison, where she was serving a sentence of two years hard labour. Coyle noted that 'we could only wave at her at Mass on Sunday as we were not allowed to kneel beside her at the altar rails.' Coyle and fellow inmate Linda Kearns hatched a plan to escape from the prison. On 31 October 1921 Coyle and Kearns, along with two other inmates Mary Burke and Aileen Keogh, with help from sympathetic warders, scaled the wall of the prison and escaped in cars driven by republicans who had been instructed to wait outside. After that escape she stayed in an IRA training camp at Duckett's Grove, County Carlow until a truce on 11 July 1921 and the Anglo-Irish Treaty in December 1921.

== Anti-treaty ==
Following the Anglo-Irish Treaty Coyle supported the anti-treaty faction. Following the signing of the treaty she was appointed organiser for Cumann na mBan, who were the first major organisation to proclaim against the Anglo-Irish Treaty, for the North West of Ireland. She toured County Donegal, County Londonderry and part of County Tyrone and found that many of the local branches had lost much of their membership and was forced to reorganise the movement in Ulster as a more streamlined model.

In response to the 1920 large-scale expulsions of Catholic workers from their jobs in Belfast, Coyle worked to enforce Sinn Féins 'Belfast Boycott' of unionist-owned businesses, banks and goods produced in that city. (See: The Troubles in Ulster (1920–1922)). The Belfast Telegraph reported that on the Londonderry and Lough Swilly Railway an armed Coyle held up the train from which she removed all copies of Belfast newspapers before publicly burning them. Coyle's activities (which were not sanctioned by Cumann na mBan's leadership) became a regular occurrence on that train line. She was also the official dispatch carrier between the IRA 1st Northern Division and 3rd Western Division, a role that included rowing between Donegal and Sligo to ensure messages were not intercepted.

During early 1922 Coyle's activities saw her frequently arrested by pro-treaty forces although on each occasion she was released without charge. However, in September 1922 the Provisional Government decided to crack down on the activities of Cumann na mBan renegades and Coyle was the first member to be arrested as part of this move. Initially held at Ballyshannon she created another first there by becoming the Cumann na mBan member to go on hunger strike, refusing food for seven days as there was no female prison guard. After being detained at Buncrana Barracks for two weeks Coyle was eventually taken to Mountjoy Prison by boat, some eight weeks after her initial arrest.

By the time Coyle arrived at Mountjoy there were already several Cumann na mBan members in the prison and overcrowding became a problem. Coyle led protests against these conditions, with the women throwing their beds out of the cells and sleeping on the floor. This lasted for six weeks before another hunger strike was begun. Later moved to the North Dublin Union internment camp after an infamous night of terror for women transferred from Mountjoy Prison and Kilmainham Gaol. Coyle noted the terrible conditions at the North Dublin Union, which had previously housed troops: 'without exaggeration you could dig the dirt off the floors with a spade and leave enough behind for worms'. Coyle was one of twenty female prisoners to escape on 7 May 1923. She was recaptured the following day however. Coyle was finally released from Kilmainham in December 1923 following a hunger strike.

== Later years ==
Coyle was appointed to the executive of Cumann na mBan in 1924 and was elected as president in 1926, after Constance Markievicz resigned to join Fianna Fáil. It was a post she held until her resignation in 1941.

Coyle, who held socialist opinions, was a founder member of the Republican Congress in 1934 although on 18 July that same year she and fellow Cumann na mBan activist Sheila Humphreys resigned after it became clear that a feud between the IRA factions would follow this move, something both women hoped to avoid.

After she stood down as President of Cumann na mBan she started research to complete a history of the organisation from 1914 to 1923. She had a particular interest in the women involved from the north of Ireland and Scotland. Her private papers reveal she had collected surveys and questionnaires from a range of women but she never published a book on this subject.

Coyle died at a nursing home in Dalkey, Dublin on 5 January 1985, aged 88.

== Personal life ==
In 1935 Coyle married Bernard O'Donnell, a Donegal IRA man and member of Saor Éire, whom she had been in a relationship since 1918. Together the two had a son (who later become a priest) and a daughter (who later became a nun). Bernard died in February 1968.
