= Marie Perolz =

Irish nationalist (1874-1950)

Acting President of the Irish Women Workers' Union
- In office February 1917 – mid-1917
- Preceded by: Constance Markievicz
- Succeeded by: Louie Bennett

Personal details
- Born: 7 May 1874 Limerick, Ireland
- Died: 1 December 1950 (aged 76) St. Kevin's Hospital, Dublin, Ireland
- Resting place: Mount Jerome Cemetery and Crematorium
- Party: Sinn Féin
- Other political affiliations: Inghinidhe na hÉireann; Irish Women Workers' Union; Gaelic League
- Spouse: James Michael Flanagan (m. 1919)
- Other names: Mary Perolz, Máire Perolz

Military service
- Allegiance: Irish Republic
- Branch/service: Cumann na mBan; Irish Citizen Army
- Rank: Intelligence Officer (ICA)
- Battles/wars: Easter Rising

Marie Perolz (7 May 1874 – 1 December 1950) was also known as Mary Perolz and Máire Perolz, and as Miss Peroze in one crucial document. She was an advanced Irish nationalist, whose career mirrored that of her husband, James Michael 'Citizen' Flanagan and her friend Constance Markievicz. She was a member of the radical women's group Inghinidhe na hÉireann (Daughters of Ireland) and the Irish Volunteers women's auxiliary Cumann na mBan.

== Early life ==
Mary Perolz was born at Market Alley in Limerick on 7 May 1874, the third child of Richard Perolz and Bridget Carter. Her father and great-grandfather were printers by trade of French Huguenot-origin, which informed her literary career. She was educated by the Sisters of Mercy in Tralee, and later by the Presentation Sisters in Cork and in Dublin, completing her schooling at George's Hill Convent. While at the Presentation Sisters she became greatly interested in Irish nationalism and joined the Gaelic League.

She joined Inghinidhe na hÉireann at its foundation in 1900. She was a member of the Provisional Committee led by Maud Gonne and later Constance Markievicz, and whose members included the Gifford sisters and Helena Molony. She introduced other women such as members of her extended family like Rose McNamara to the organisation. She was frequently involved in the theatre, and acted the first ever play in Irish staged publicly in Dublin, playing Meadda in December 1902 in Eillis agus an Bhean Deirce (Ellis and the Beggar Woman) by playwright Peadar Toner Mac Fhionnlaoich, better known under his pseudonym, Cú Uladh.

Perolz, as her friends called her, taught Irish history and language in classes organised by Inghinidhe na hÉireann for Dublin schoolchildren, conducted by lantern light at night. Marie and Helena Molony were stalwarts of the Liberty Players and National Players with the young actor Captain Sean Connolly, who would die in the Easter Rising.

== Feminist, actress and revolutionary ==
By 1916, Perolz was a committed revolutionary, having joined Cumann na mBan and the syndicalist Irish Citizen Army, of which her friend Constance Markievicz was a leading officer. She was a friend of James Connolly and in contact with Jim Larkin, the leaders of the Irish Transport and General Workers' Union. She worked for the Irish Women Workers' Union (IWWU), and attended Trade Union Congress meetings at Sligo on its behalf.

Perolz was registered at the official owner of Spark, a weekly socialist newspaper published between February 1915 and April 1916, edited by Markievicz. At an important public meeting in March 1916, she spoke as Markievicz, who was banned under the Defence of the Realm Act 1914 from making appearances. Perolz read the text of Markievicz's speech and read the exclusion order imposed, and answered the questions of the audience.

During the Easter Rising Perolz took a vital message from Padraic Pearse to Waterford, Cork, Limerick and Tipperary calling out the troops, and also arranged six other people to carry the same message around the country. As she cycled through Cork she met Tomás Mac Curtain and Terence MacSwiney in their broken-down car, on their way to inform volunteers that the Rising was cancelled. On the flyleaf of a pocket book, she was carrying was written the secret message from Pearse: "We go into action at noon today. PHP." The initialled notepaper took Mac Curtain and MacSwiney by surprise, as they had expected orders to be signed rather than initialled. She got back to Dublin by Wednesday of Easter Week.

After the Rising Perolz hid out in Tralee, but she was betrayed and arrested on 2 May 1916, and brought to Dublin Castle under escort and imprisoned at Mountjoy Jail. The charge against her was her 'ownership' of James Connolly's Spark, 'the seditious weekly paper'. (Note: "The Spark" during the period of its circulation was estimated to be 2,382 copies.) Sedition was a felonious crime, equivalent to treason, and could carry the death penalty. On 5 June, General Maxwell was still awaiting orders for her deportation to England. Constance Markievicz, detained under Defence of the Realm Regulation 14B, was sent to Oxford Jail. Kathleen Lynn was sent to Bath women's prison. James Connolly's secretary Winifred Carney went with Marie, Helena Molony, Brighid Foley, and Ellen Ryan to Aylesbury Prison. From an initial tally of 73 arrests, these were the only women imprisoned in England after the Rising. They finally left Dublin on 20 June 1916. Perolz was sent to serve a sentence at Lewes Prison.

On their arrival in England, the women were given seven days to appeal against the sentences. The appeals were sent to a judge in the British High Court in London.

Perolz' arrest scandalised her family; several resolved to change their surname to 'Prole', to disassociate themselves from her. After questions in the British parliament and a court appearance, Perolz and Breda Foley were released in July 1916. They were issued with travel warrants and expected to use them to go home to Ireland, landing at Dún Laoghaire. In February 1917 she was made Acting President of the Irish Women Workers' Union in Markievicz's stead. She travelled to England to greet her friend on her release from Aylesbury Prison on 17 June 1917, and accompanied her back to Ireland.

== Personal life ==
Perolz and James Michael Flanagan, a leftist affectionately known as 'Citizen Flanagan', fell in love in 1919. They lived at 127 Botanic Road in Glasnevin, and later St. Lawrence cottage in Sutton. She continued to work for women's rights in the labour movement. They married in 1919. She died on 1 December 1950 at St. Kevin's Hospital, and is buried at Mount Jerome Cemetery and Crematorium in Harold's Cross, Dublin.

== Bibliography ==
=== Manuscripts ===
- Royal Commission on the Rebellion in Ireland, Report (1916), Cd. 8279. Minutes of Evidence, Cd. 8311.

=== Primary and secondary sources ===
- Benton, Sarah, 'Women Disarmed: The Militarization of Politics in Ireland 1913–23', Feminist Review 50 (1995)
- Conlon, Lil, Cumann na mBan and the Women of Ireland 1913–1925 (Kilkenny 1969)
- De Paor, Liam, On the Easter Proclamation and Other Declarations (Dublin 1997)
- Fox, R.M., Rebel Irishwomen (Dublin 1935)
- Mannix, Joyce, 'The Story of Limerick and Kerry in 1916', "Capuchin Annual" (1966)
- McCarthy, Cal, Cumann na mBan and the Irish Revolution (Dublin 2007)
- McCoole, Sinead, No Ordinary Women: Irish Female Activists in the Revolutionary Years 1900–1923 (Dublin 2003)
- McKillen, Beth, 'Irish Feminism and National Separatism, 1914–23', Eire-Ireland 17 (1982)
- Townshend, Charles, Easter 1916: The Irish Rebellion (2015)
- Townshend, C, The Republic: The Fight For Irish Independence (London 2014)
- Ui Chonail, Eilis Bean, 'A Cumann na mBan Recalls Easter Week', Capuchin Annual (1966)

=== External links ===
- http://www.irishvolunteers.org
