= Kathleen Balfe =

Irish nationalist

- Born: 18 February 1893; Drogheda, Ireland
- Died: 14 September 1984 (aged 91); Drogheda, Ireland
- Other name: Kathleen Dempsey
- Occupations: Politician, Dressmaker
- Known for: Founding member of Cumann na mBan and first woman to be elected to Drogheda council
- Spouse: Vince Dempsey
- Children: Deirdre, Vincent, Aidan, Raymond and Gertie
- Parent(s): Hugh Balfe and Rose Russell

Kathleen Balfe (18 February 1893 – 14 September 1984) was an Irish nationalist who was a founder member of Cumann na mBan in Drogheda and the first woman member of the Drogheda council in 1967.

== Personal life ==
She was born as Catherine Balfe on Chord Road, Drogheda, County Louth, to Hugh Balfe, a labourer, and Rose Russell. She had nine siblings, five of which were boys and four girls. Her brothers' names were John, Hugh, Patrick, Frances and Joseph. Her sisters' names were Alice, Rose, Mary Frances and Maryann. She had a passion for all things Irish and enjoyed dancing at the top of Laurence's gate for American tourists. Balfe and her family lived at the address 54 Chord Road during the Irish War of Independence.

Their house was raided every week for eighteen months. Despite the constant raids, Balfe continued to live here with her family until she married her husband Vincent Dempsey. They bought a house on Sandyford terrace and had five children: Deirdre, Vincent and Aidan, who are all deceased, and Raymond and Gertie. Her husband Vincent died in 1937 at the age of 39 and Balfe became a dress maker to provide for her family.

Balfe's sister Mary took on the role of a second mother to Balfe's children. Born in 1898, Mary was the youngest child of the Balfe family and performed missions with her sister in the Cumann Na mBan. Mary lived with her sister until she died in 1975 at the age of 77. Balfe's daughter Deirdre, born in 1928, was nine when Vincent died. She later married a railway station officer named Richard O’Brien in 1953. They had 5 children, Brian, Richard, Carol, Neil, and John. Balfe also had great-grandchildren named Ciaran, Aine, Daire and Oisin. Balfe had grandchildren through her other daughter Gertie. One of which was named Paula and died in at the age of 19 when she was hit by a vehicle being driven by a drunk driver in 1983. Since then, Balfe's daughter Gertie, has made great strides in the prevention of drink driving in Ireland and has recently been awarded the RSA "leading lights in road safety" award.

She retired at the age of 81 and died ten years later.

== Political life ==
She joined the Cumann na mBan in 1917 as a regional founding member of the organisation. This was ultimately the beginning of her political career. From 1919 to 1921 she was involved in the War of Independence. Balfe's role consisted of visiting her local Royal Irish Constabulary barracks, passing on information to prisoners, and at least once, smuggling a machine gun underneath her coat to be used for an attack on the Ardee barracks, County Louth.

Described as being Fine Gael to the bone, the loyal supporter ran for and was elected to her local Drogheda Council in 1967. A moment in Irish history as she was the first woman to be elected to the council.

== Cumann na mBan Membership ==
The Cumann na mBan was an Irish Republican women's paramilitary organisation. It was founded on 2 April 1914 with the goal of organising Irish women to advance the cause of Irish independence and to support Irish men through supplying arms for the defence of Ireland. In the Irish War of Independence, the Cumann na mBan undertook tasks such as gun running and message carrying. Balfe was a member of the organisation, with her family also having close ties to the Irish Nationalist movement. Her sister, Mary, who was also a member of the Cumman na mBan and completed many missions, was buried with military honours in 1975. Her brothers, Hugh, Frank and Joseph were also members of an IRA Flying Column.

Balfe would go on to play an important role in the War of Independence from 1919 to 1921. In her time with the Cumann na mBan, she encountered the Black and Tans and performed numerous missions. She visited prisoners in Royal Irish Constabulary (RIC) barracks and delivered intelligence to members of the Nationalist movement. She also carried a machine gun under her coat to Ballapousta, in preparation for a planned attack on the RIC barracks in Ardee, County Louth.
