= Aoife de Búrca =

Red cross nurse during the Easter Rising

- Born: Eva Burke; 3 October 1885; Carbury, County Kildare, Ireland
- Died: 1 December 1974 (aged 89); Rathfarnham, County Dublin, Ireland

Aoife de Búrca (3 October 1885 – 1 December 1974), one of the few nurses stationed in the Hibernian Bank and the General Post Office, Dublin during the Easter Rising, de Búrca was one of those who treated James Connolly before his arrest.

== Biography ==
She was born Evaline Mary Burke on 3 October 1885 to Mary Kelly and Henry J. Burke. Her father Henry had been born in Albany, New York to Irish parents. He moved back to Ireland where he married, and settled in Carbury, County Kildare, Ireland. The couple had 5 children. de Búrca attended school in the Dominican Convent on Eccles street in Dublin. She went on to study nursing.

She came from a republican family. Her younger brother Frank Burke was one of the Irish volunteers and was stationed in the GPO. When de Búrca heard of the insurrection she immediately went into the city centre to find out what was needed. She returned to her lodgings, packed a bag and hired a car to take her and her luggage to the action. There she was given a position across the road from the GPO. She remained in the buildings of the Hibernian hotel treating the wounded, including treating Captain Thomas Weafer where he died, until the wounded were evacuated through the walls of the basement and across the road. From then on she was stationed in the GPO itself. de Búrca spent one night at home during the rising and worked as a messenger for Patrick Pearse on her way out of the centre of the city. She returned the following day and served there aiding in treating the injured until the building was collapsing due to the fire caused by shelling. At that point all wounded were evacuated to the Jervis Street Hospital. de Búrca remained there over night and returned to her lodgings in the morning.

de Búrca spent her life working for Dublin Corporation as a nurse. She lived in Drumcondra until she moved in with her brother Frank in Rathfarnham where she died in November 1974. The Red Cross armlet and apron that she wore is on display in the National Museum of Ireland. Her memoir of the event was written the same year as well as being updated in the 1960s. Her story was covered in a television production called Seven Women for RTÉ
