= Lil Conlon =

Irish writer and activist (1894–1983)

- Born: Elizabeth Conlon; 29 March 1894; Blarney Street, County Cork, Ireland
- Died: 27 October 1983 (aged 89); North Infirmary Hospital, Ireland
- Resting place: Kilcrea cemetery, Ovens, County Cork
- Other name: Lil Conlan
- Occupations: civil servant in Dublin and clerical staff at University College Cork
- Known for: Cumann na mBan
- Movement: Irish War of Independence, Cumann na mBan

Elizabeth "Lil" Conlon (29 March 1894 – 27 October 1983), was a contributor to the Irish War of Independence, and a leading member of the Shandon Branch of the Cumann na mBan in Cork. She is one of the only women involved in this war to create a written account of her participation.

== Early life ==
In 1894, Lil was born into a family of seven on Blarney Street County Cork.

== Time in Cumann na mBan ==
Both her and her sister Mary Conlon were active in nationalist circles in the Cork area from a young age, having been present at the inaugural meeting of Cork's Cumann na mBan branch in 1914.

Lil served on the branch's committee and was responsible for establishing the teaching of the Irish language in the Shandon Branch, while her sister May served as secretary. After the schism of support over the Anglo-Irish Treaty, Lil, her sister, Bridie Conway, and others created the Cork Executive of Cumann na mBan. As avid supporters of the Treaty, Lil and her sister contributed to the 16 to 7 in favour vote at the branch in February 1922.

== Later life ==
Conlon is one of the only women who has documented her participation in Ireland's fight for independence. Her memoir Cumann Na mBan and the Women of Ireland 1913-25 (1969) is the first of its kind, detailing a comprehensive history of the Irish republican paramilitary organisation, Cumann na mBan. It is written around a central question of "what did the women of Ireland do anyway?" in the War of Independence (1919-1921). The book is an eyewitness account which takes a compalatory approach to the activities of Cork's Cumann na mBan branches during their active years. She wrote of them as "heroines of history, unsung, unrecorded but none-the-less fulfilling a glorious destiny".

In her later life, Lil continued her support her local institutions in the Cork area, most prominently the Catholic Church and the Gaelic Athletics Association.

== Criticism ==
Lil Conlon's writing has been put in contrast with those written by Anti-Treaty writers of the time. The writings are criticised for their failure to political analyse the conflict and for placing most of its emphasis on the "traditionally feminine work" carried out by the Cumann na mBan women in Cork.
