= Elliott sisters =

Women of the Easter Rising

Elliott Sisters
- Cumann na mBan: Emily Ledwith (née Emily Elliott) with her sister Eilis Ní Briain (née Eilish Elliott)
- Current region: Leinster
- Origin: Tonagh, County Westmeath, Ireland
- Members: Emily, Eilish (Eilís)

The Elliott sisters, Emily (1893 – 3 March 1983, later Ledwith) and Eilish (26 June 1896 – 29 March 1966, later Eilís Ní Briain), were two Irish sisters notable for their involvement in Irish Nationalism, especially in the Easter Rising in 1916. They were founding members of Cumann na mBan.

== Biographies ==
The sisters were born in Tonagh near Glasson, County Westmeath. They were born to Peter Elliott, a farmer, and his wife, Margaret (Berry) Elliott. They had eight surviving siblings: Theresa, Rebecca, Ethel (Sr. Imelda), J.J. (John Joseph), Andrew, Charles, Edward, and Arthur. At the time of the rising Eilís was living at Gardiner Place in Dublin.

The sisters were members of Cumann na mBan. Emily was a member of the Keating branch and wanted to volunteer in the General Post Office, (GPO) and headed into the city with Eilís Ryan. They were turned away from the GPO and sent to Reis's Chambers on the opposite side of O'Connell Street from the GPO during the Easter Rising. The volunteers were trying to ensure the details of the rising got released and the chambers hosted a wireless school. The women were responsible for ensuring the men had rations, which required them crossing O'Connell street while it was under fire more than once. On the second day the two women were joined by Eilish Elliott. The sisters later served in the Four Courts and in Fr Matthew Hall both in providing rations and first aid support. On the final night and with the assistance of the priests, the women mingled with the congregation from the church and avoided being arrested.

Westmeath musician Enda Seery composed a suite of traditional Irish music, A New Ireland in the Orchard Air, to honour the sisters. The council decided to name a new bridge over the River Shannon the Cumman na mBan bridge in honour of the sisters and the organisation.

On 7 April 2018, Westmeath County Council organised the renaming of a road in Athlone as Elliott Road in honour of two local sisters' contributions to the Easter Rising. The Mayor of Athlone, Aengus O’Rourke, unveiled the sign for the newly named road. Eilís Ní Briain's grandson, John McCann, made a speech on behalf of the Elliott family. Eilís Ní Briain's eldest grandson, Kevin Griffin, wore her medals on this historic occasion attended by about a hundred members of the Elliott family.
