= Gertie Shields =

Irish road safety activist

- Cathaoirleach of Balbriggan Town Council
- Born: 1930; Drogheda, Ireland
- Died: 30 July 2015 (aged 84–85); Dublin, Ireland
- Other names: Gertie Dempsey
- Known for: Founded Irish MADD

Gertie Shields (1930 – 30 July 2015) was the Irish woman who founded the Irish version of Mothers Against Drunk Driving

== Life and work ==
Born Gertie Dempsey in Drogheda to Vincent Dempsey and Kathleen Balfe in 1930. She had 4 siblings, Deirdre, Vincent, Aidan and Raymond, who has been mayor of Drogheda. She married Gerry Shields and had nine children. She lived in Balbriggan in Dublin. Her mother had been a remarkable woman and Shields said she was a huge influence on her life.

== Political life ==
Shields' daughter Paula was killed by a drunk driver, with several of her friends, when Paula was 19 years old in 1983. The driver was given a short suspended sentence and driving ban but even the ban was lifted shortly after. Shields fought against the attitude and sentencing of drink driving convictions. In 1986 Shields formed the Irish version of the American organisation MADD, though known in Ireland as Mothers against Drink Driving.

In 1994 Shields ran for the Balbriggan Town Commission as an independent candidate and was elected. She was the Cathaoirleach (Chairman) in 2002.

Her aunt Concepta Dempsey was one of those killed in bomb blasts in Dublin in 1974 during the Dublin and Monaghan bombings. As a result, Shields was also working with Justice for the Forgotten which began in 1996.

In 2009 she was awarded the freedom of the town hall and retired from her position on the Commission. In 2013, Shields was honoured for her contribution to Road Safety by the Irish Road Safety Authority at their 'Leading Lights in Road Safety' awards with the Supreme Award.

She died in the Mater Hospital in 2015.
