= Brigid Lyons Thornton =

Irish revolutionary and doctor (1896–1987)

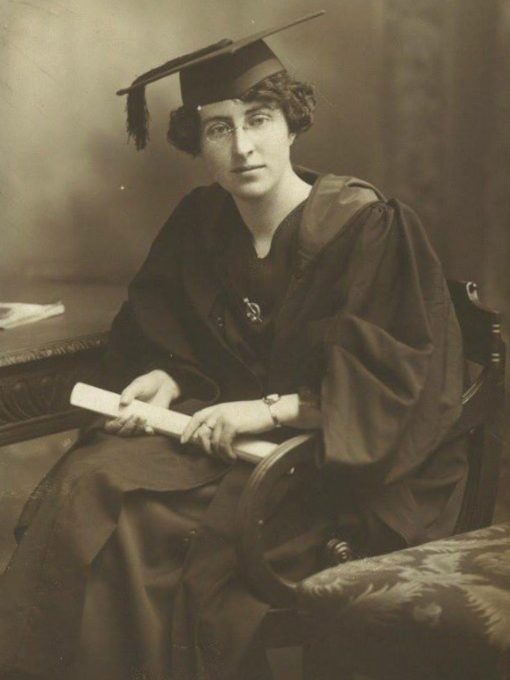
- Lyons in 1922
- Born: Brigid Lyons; 13 May 1896; Northyard, Scramogue, near Strokestown in County Roscommon, Ireland
- Died: 15 November 1987 (91 years of age); Foxford, County Mayo, Ireland
- Occupation: Doctor
- Military Service
- Allegiance: Irish Free State
- Branch: National Army
- Rank: Commandant in Cumann na mBan; Medical Officer in National Army
- Unit: Cumann na mBan
- Conflicts: Easter Rising; Irish Civil War

Brigid Lyons Thornton (13 May 1896 – 15 November 1987) was an Irish republican who was a member of Cumann na mBan, an officer in the Irish Free State Army and a doctor. From a young age she was involved in the nationalist movement, starting with selling badges and flags at the funeral of O'Donovan Rossa in 1915.

== Personal life ==
Brigid Lyons was born in Northyard Scramogue, County Roscommon, on 13 May 1896. She was the daughter of farmer and Fenian Patrick Lyons and Margaret McGuinness. At a young age, Brigid moved to Longford to live with her uncle Frank McGuinness, later a senator, and his wife Kate, who paid for her secondary school education. McGuinness is credited for Thornton's keen interest in politics and Irish history. Brigid Lyons was a medical student and, as a member of Cumman na mBan, was involved with the Irish Volunteers during 1916. She was arrested during the Easter Rising and interned in Kilmainham Gaol.

== Revolutionary ==
She graduated from Galway medical school in 1922, being the youngest medical student there. She became the first commissioned female officer in the new Irish Free State Army. She and her later husband Edward Thornton met when Brigid became ill with tuberculosis and was sent to Switzerland with other officers who had a similar condition. During this time Lyons learned how to treat tuberculosis while she was a patient, which would be a significant advantage in later years. She took her postgraduate diploma in public health in 1927 and then entered the public health service in County Kildare, later moving to County Cork until she finally ended up in Dublin where she worked until retirement. Lyons helped to treat many infectious diseases.

== Marriage ==
Brigid Lyons married Captain Edward Thornton on 10 October 1925, in Dublin, at the Chapel of St Kevin in the Pro Cathedral. The ceremony was a quiet reunion of family and friends. Her husband returned to Switzerland to recover from TB and was later released and cured. He became a lawyer. Brigid Thornton attended the National University in 1947 and finished a postgraduate degree in public health. She was very passionate about her work in the public health system in Ireland and she resided permanently on home soil. Meanwhile her husband resided in Switzerland for most of the winter months, working as a lawyer, and their relationship was maintained through letter writing and yearly visits to Ireland. They are buried alongside each other in Toomore Cemetery.

== 1916 Easter Rising ==
Lyons returned to Longford when she heard the news of the 1916 Easter Rising. Her uncle Joe McGuinness was serving in the Four Courts along with Patrick Pearse, James Connolly and Michael Collins. She decided to join her uncle and the volunteers he had gathered in Dublin. Their car failed to enter the Four Courts but the crew was able to pass the barricade, and Brigid, along with other Cumann na mBan volunteers, provided food and nursed the wounded rebels in the first battalion who had taken possession of the Four Courts and adjoining streets. After the surrender, she was held captive in Kilmainham Jail with her comrades. During that imprisonment, she heard that fourteen of leaders of the Rising, people she admired, had been shot. After her release, she returned to continue studying medicine in Galway.

== Revolutionary activities ==
Lyons was involved in Sinn Féin and Cumann na mBan, although women were limited by their male counterparts in the scope of their revolutionary activities. However, Lyons contributed as a rebel, soldier and commissioned medical officer. In 1917 she set up a Cumann na mBan group in Galway. Later she became a first lieutenant in 1922 and was commissioned by Michael Collins as the first and only woman to be accepted as officer in the Free State Army when a new, permanent medical service was established.

== Medical career ==
Thornton dedicated her life to both revolutionary activities and the medical sector; she was a practitioner, lecturer and researcher. Her involvement as a doctor was not only hospital work but that of a volunteer. She was an avid educator of women on the importance of hygiene in the development of children and factors of disease that flourished in the impoverished slums of the inner city and surrounding suburbs. This work was marginalised by the lack of funds for a public health service to help ordinary people. Clean water was a commodity at this time and a strain of gastroenteritis was the cause of death of many babies. In her youth Thornton had expressed the passion to become a teacher, but as women's role in society changed and constraints became less stringent, she could study medicine and pursue greater participation in this area.

Lyons acquired a county scholarship to study an undergraduate degree in Medicine in University College Galway in 1917. She also received a postgraduate diploma in public health from the National University of Ireland in 1927. In the 1950s, when vaccines were developed and distributed to the general public, Thornton helped combat the TB epidemic through distribution of the BGG vaccination by a team of 15 people. She herself had been plagued by the illness alongside her husband. As well as being a medical officer in Kildare and Cork, she worked for the Dublin Health Authority and was medical inspector at the Carnegie Centre in Dublin.

== Later life ==
She was a librarian in the Rotunda Hospital, where she was an advisor to the new doctors. Lyons was heavily involved in the Medical Benevolent Fund. Her retirement was spent as a researcher in Trinity College Dublin.

== Death ==
Brigid Lyons lived a long life, surviving her husband Captain Edward Thornton who died in 1946. The couple had no children. She suffered ill health in her late seventies but continued to work as a volunteer in the Rotunda Maternity Hospital. Lyons died of cardiac-respiratory arrest, as stated on her death certificate, on 15 November 1987 at the age of 91.

She was buried on the 71st anniversary of the Easter Rising in Toomore Cemetery, Foxford, County Mayo. Members of the Western Command rendered her military honours at her burial and her coffin was draped in the tricolour.

== Bibliography ==
- Cowell, John, A Noontide Blazing: Brigid Lyons Thornton – Rebel, Soldier, Doctor (Dublin 2005)
- McCarthy, Cal, Cumann na mBan and the Irish Revolution (Dublin 2007)
- Mac Curtain, M and O'Corrain, D (eds.), Women in Irish Society (Dublin 1978)
- McCoole, Sinead, No Ordinary Women: Irish Female Activists in the Revolutionary Years 1900–1923 (Dublin 2003)
- McKillen, Beth, 'Irish Feminism and National Separatism, 1914–23', Eire-Ireland 17 (1982)
