= Josephine Hayden =

Irish Republican political activist

Josephine Hayden (born c. 1946) is the General Secretary of Republican Sinn Féin. She served five years in prison for possession of weapons found in a van she was travelling in at Tallaght, Dublin, in 1995.
