= Cumann na Saoirse =

- Founder: Jennie Wyse Power
- Founded: March 1922
- Dissolved: May 1923
- Split from: Cumann na mBan
- Headquarters: Ireland
- Ideology: Irish nationalism; Pro Anglo-Irish Treaty

Cumann na Saoirse (The League for Freedom) was an Irish republican women's organisation formed in Dublin in 1922, following a split in Cumann na mBan.

== History ==
On 7 January 1922 the Anglo-Irish Treaty was approved by the Second Dáil by a close vote of 64–57. On 5 February a convention was held to discuss this, and 419 Cumann na mBan members voted against as opposed to 63 in favour. The Pro-Treaty women, headed by Jennie Wyse Power set up Cumann na Saoirse to replace Cumann na mBan in March 1922. Some of those who supported the Treaty changed the name of their branches to Cumann na Saoirse, while others retained their name but gave allegiance to the Free State Government.

By July 1923, the Irish Civil War having ended, the organisation was ready to dissolve itself. It enquired to Richard Mulcahy about transferring membership to an Irish Red Cross, but no such society was set up until 1939.

== Sources ==
- Conlon, Lil (1969). Cumann na mBan and the Women of Ireland 1913–1925. Kilkenny: Kilkenny People.
- Boylan, Henry, (ed.), A Dictionary of Irish Biography (Dublin 1999).
- Ward, Margaret, 'Marginality and Militancy: Cumann na mBan, 1914-1936', in Austen Morgan and Bob Purdie (eds.), Ireland: Divided Nation, Divided Class (London 1980).
