= Mary Colum =

Irish writer and literary critic

- Born: Mary Catherine Gunning Maguire; 13 June 1884; Collooney, County Sligo
- Died: 22 October 1957 (aged 73); New York City, New York, U.S.
- Occupations: Writer, Critic
- Spouse: Padraic Colum
- Writing career
- Genres: Historical, Non-fiction, Speculative

Mary Catherine Gunning Colum (née Maguire; 13 June 1884 – 22 October 1957) was an Irish literary critic and author, who also co-founded a literary journal.

== Biography ==
Mary Catherine Gunning Maguire was born in Collooney, County Sligo, the daughter of Charles Maguire and Catherine (Gunning) Maguire. Her mother died in 1895, leaving her to be reared by her grandmother, also named Catherine, in Ballisodare, County Sligo. She attended boarding school at St Louis' Convent, Monaghan.

Educated at Royal University, Trinity she was founder of the Twilight Literary Society which led her to meet W. B. Yeats. She regularly attended the Abbey Theatre and was a frequent visitor amongst the salons, readings and debates there. After graduation in 1909, she taught with Louise Gavan Duffy at St Ita's (companion school to Patrick Pearse's St Enda's School). She was active with Thomas MacDonagh and others in nationalist and cultural causes. She co-founded The Irish Review (1911–14) with David Houston, Thomas MacDonagh, et al. and she and her husband, Padraic Colum, edited the magazine for some months of its four-year career. She was encouraged by Yeats to specialise in French literary criticism and to translate Paul Claudel.

She married Padraic Colum in July 1912, and they moved to New York in 1914, living occasionally in London and Paris. In middle age she was encouraged to return to writing, and became established as a literary generalist in American journals, including Poetry, Scribner's, The Nation, The New Republic, New York Times Review of Books, and The Tribune.

She associated with James Joyce in Paris, and discouraged him from duping enquirers about the origins of the interior monologue in the example of Edouard Dujardin. She accepted Joyce's very ill daughter Lucia for a week in their Paris flat at the height of her 'hebephrenic' attack, while herself preparing for an operation in May 1932. She served as the literary editor of The Forum magazine from 1933 to 1941, commenced teaching comparative literature with Padraic at Columbia University in 1941.

She rebutted Oliver St. John Gogarty's intemperate remarks about Joyce in the Saturday Review of Literature in 1941.

A work of reminiscence "Our Friend James Joyce (1959)", written by herself and her husband, each writing various chapters, and assembled posthumously by Padraic Colum, sensitively recalls the writer; her letters are held in Scribner's Archive, Princeton University Library, while a collection of her papers is held at SUNY.

She was the author of several books, including the autobiographical Life and the Dream, and From These Roots, a collection of her criticism.

== Works ==
- From These Roots: The Ideas that have Made Modern Literature (1937)
- Life and the Dream (1947)
- Our Friend James Joyce (1958, with Padraic Colum), memoir

== Sources ==
- Twentieth Century Authors: A Biographical Dictionary of Modern Literature, edited by Stanley J. Kunitz and Howard Haycraft, New York, The H. W. Wilson Company, 1942.
- Modern Irish Writers: A Bio-Critical Sourcebook, edited by Alexander G. Gonzalez, Greenwood Press, 1997.
