= Cumann na mBan =

Irish republican women's paramilitary organisation

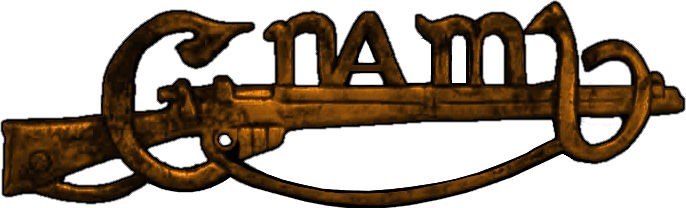
- Founded: 2 April 1914; 112 years ago
- Allegiance: Irish Republic
- Ideology: Irish republicanism Irish nationalism

Cumann na mBan (Irish pronunciation: [ˈkʊmˠən̪ˠ n̪ˠə ˈmˠanˠ]; lit. 'The Women's Council' but in English termed The Irishwomen's Council), abbreviated C na mB, is an Irish republican women's paramilitary organisation formed in Dublin on 2 April 1914, merging with and dissolving Inghinidhe na hÉireann, and in 1916, it became an auxiliary of the Irish Volunteers. Although it was otherwise an independent organisation, its executive was subordinate to that of the Irish Volunteers, and later, the Irish Republican Army.

Cumann na mBan was active in the War of Independence and took the anti-Treaty side in the Civil War. Cumann na mBan was declared an illegal organisation by the government of the Irish Free State in 1923. This was reversed when Fianna Fáil came to power in 1932.

During the splits in the republican movement of the later part of the 20th century, Fianna Éireann and Cumann na mBan supported Provisional Sinn Féin in 1969 and Republican Sinn Féin in 1986.

== Foundation and split ==
The foundation of Cumann na mBan followed the foundation of the Irish Volunteers, but the background for it is unclear. Discussions were ongoing from late 1913, and Jennie Wyse Power appears to have been one of the prime movers. The inaugural meeting was held in Wynn's Hotel, Dublin, on 2 April 1914, attended by about 100 women and chaired by Agnes O'Farrelly, a Redmondite who was most likely chosen because she was attractive to a wide base of nationalists. A constitution was published stating the aims as:

1. To advance the cause of Irish liberty.
2. To organise Irishwomen in furtherance of this object.
3. To assist in arming and equipping a body of Irishmen for the defence of Ireland.
4. To form a Fund for these purposes to be called "The Defence of Ireland Fund."

In addition to their local subscriptions, members of Cumann na mBan were expected to support the Defence of Ireland Fund, "through subscription or otherwise." Among the members of the Provisional Committee were Wyse Power, Farrelly, Agnes MacNeill (wife of Eoin MacNeill), Nancy O'Rahilly, Louise Gavan Duffy and Mary Colum; the latter two were hon. secretaries.

Branches, which pledged to the Constitution of the organisation, were formed throughout the country and were directed by the Provisional Committee. The first branch was named the Ard Chraobh (Central Branch), and held its meetings in Brunswick Street before and after the 1916 Easter Rising. Cumann na mBan maintained its independence; a booklet published by it stating that members did not consider themselves "the auxiliaries or the handmaidens or the camp followers of the Volunteers - we are their allies. We are an independent body with our own executive and its own constitution."

In September 1914, the Irish Volunteers split over John Redmond's appeal for its members to enlist in the British Army. The following month, the executive of Cumann na mBan issued a manifesto rejecting Redmond's position. This led to a split, leaving a greatly reduced organisation which pledged allegiance to the smaller of the post-split Volunteers, which retained the name "Irish Volunteers". At its convention on 31 October 1915, Cumann na mBan adopted a new constitution, creating for the first time the position of president, to which Jennie Wyse Power was elected. It also adopted a uniform.

== Easter Rising ==
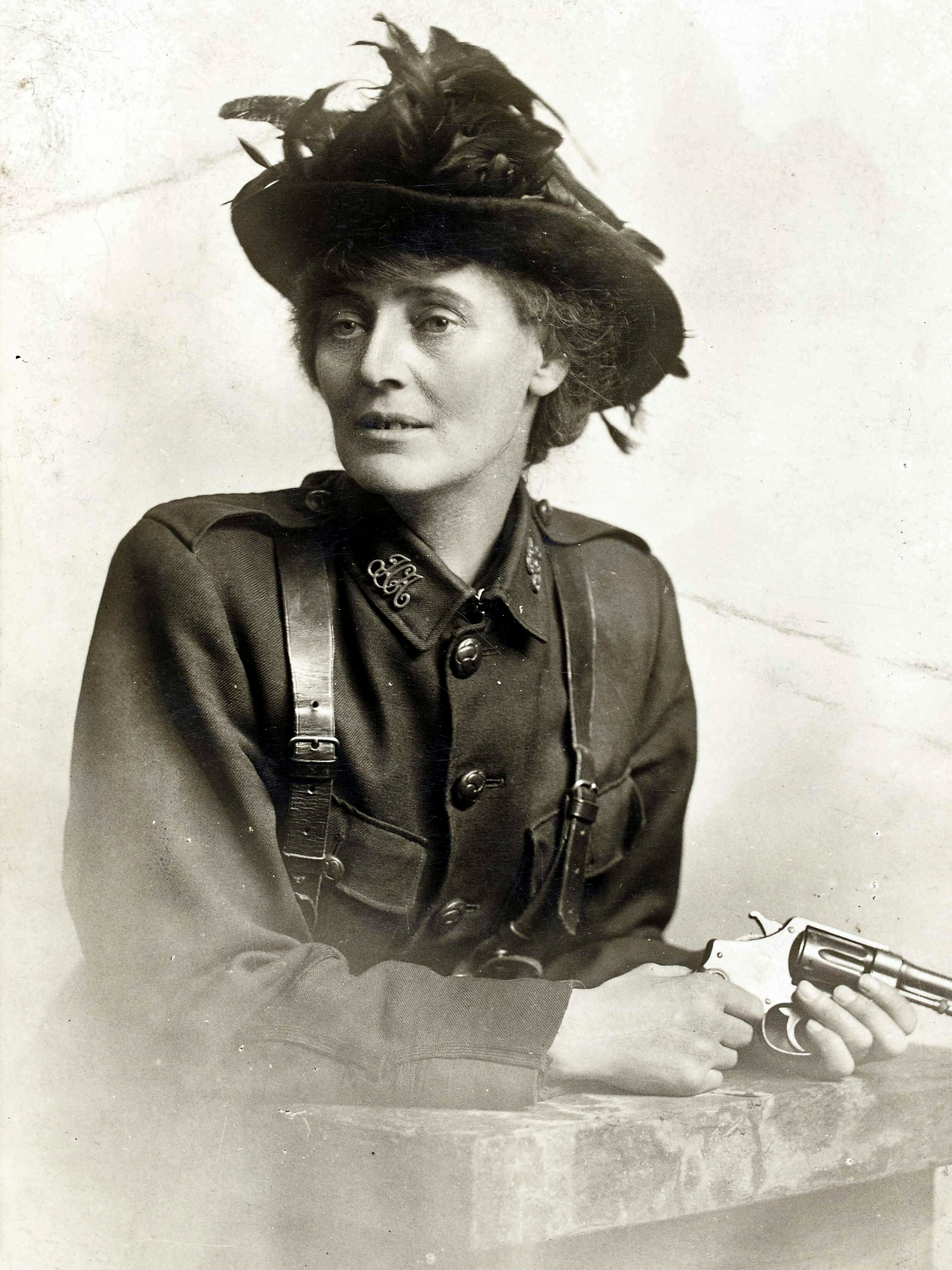
Constance Markiewicz took part in the Easter Rising and subsequently took control of Cumann na mBan in the aftermath

On 23 April 1916, when the Military Council of the Irish Republican Brotherhood finalised arrangements for the Easter Rising, it integrated Cumann na mBan, along with the Irish Volunteers and Irish Citizen Army, into the 'Army of the Irish Republic'. Patrick Pearse was appointed Commandant-General and James Connolly Commandant-General of the Dublin Division.

On the day of the Rising, Cumann na mBan members, including Winifred Carney, who arrived armed with both a Webley revolver and a typewriter, entered the General Post Office on O'Connell Street in Dublin with their male counterparts. By nightfall, women insurgents were established in all the major rebel strongholds throughout the city except Boland's Mill and the South Dublin Union held by Éamon de Valera and Eamonn Ceannt.

The majority of the women worked as Red Cross workers, couriers or procured rations for the men. Members also gathered intelligence on scouting expeditions, carried despatches and transferred arms from dumps across the city to insurgent strongholds.

Some members of Cumann na mBan were also members of the Citizen Army and as such were combatants in the Rising. Constance Markievicz is said to have shot and killed a policeman at St Stephen's Green during the opening phase of the hostilities. (Note: This is disputed by some, including Markievicz's biographer Anne Haverty.) She carried out sniper attacks on British troops and with Mary Hyland and Lily Kempson, was among a small force under Frank Robbins which occupied the College of Surgeons opposite the Green and failed to retrieve rifles that were believed to be held there by the college's Officer Training Corps.

At the Four Courts the women of Cumann na mBan helped to organise the evacuation of buildings at the time of surrender and to destroy incriminating papers. More typical was the General Post Office (GPO), where Pearse insisted that most of them (excluding Carney, who refused to leave the injured James Connolly) leave at noon on Friday, 28 April. The building was then coming under shell- and machine-gun fire and many casualties were anticipated. The following day the leaders at the GPO decided to negotiate surrender. Pearse asked Cumann na mBan member Elizabeth O'Farrell (a mid-wife at the National Maternity Hospital) to act as a go-between. Under British military supervision she brought Pearse's surrender order to the rebel units still fighting in Dublin. Over 70 women, including many of the leading figures in Cumann na mBan, were arrested after the insurrection and many of the women who had been captured fighting were imprisoned in Kilmainham; all but twelve had been released by 8 May 1916. Markievicz was transferred to Aylesbury Jail in England, and while there she was elected president of Cumann na mBan.

== War of Independence ==
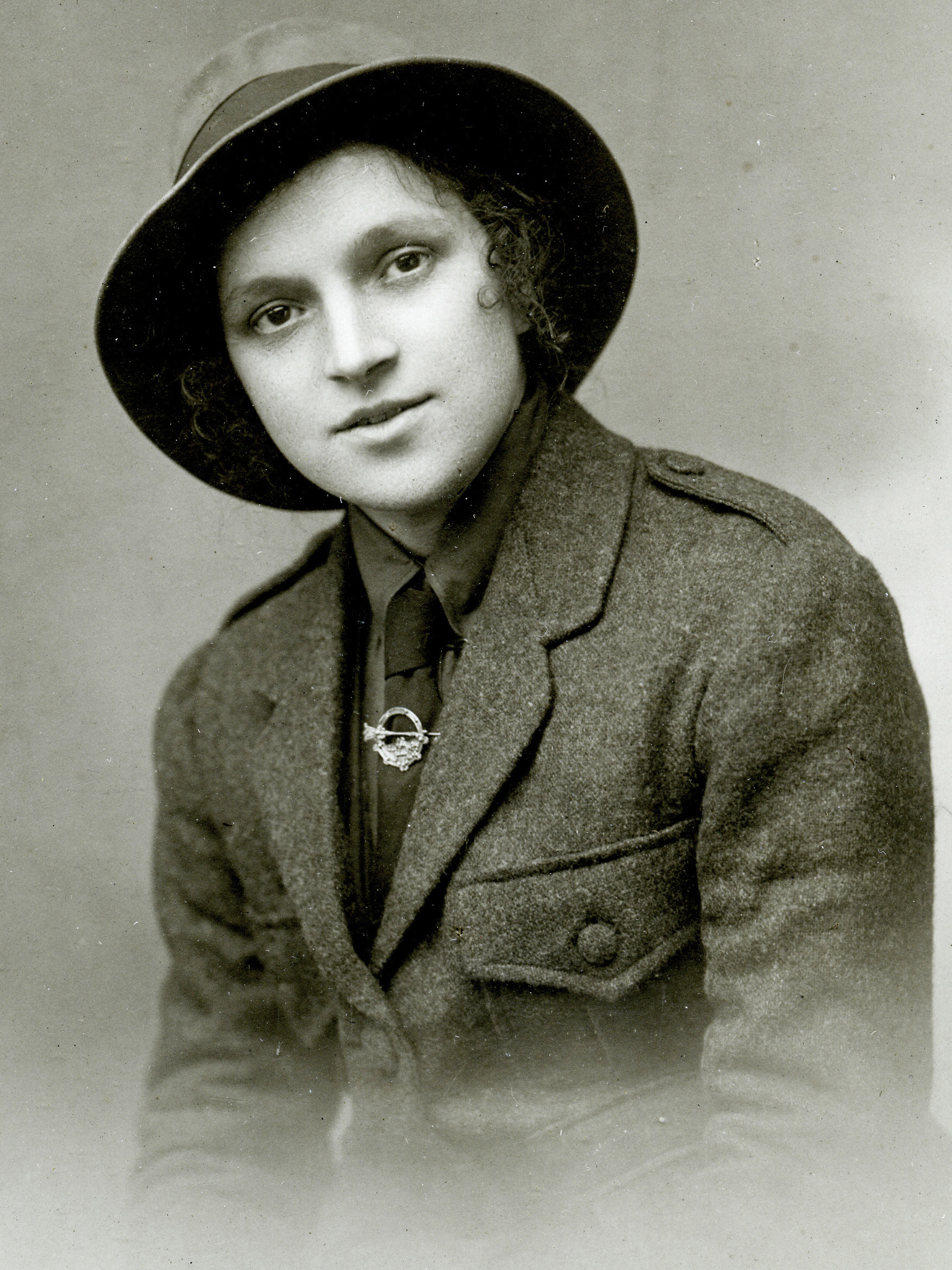
Executive member Bridie O'Mullane in her Cumann na mBan uniform, c. 1918

Revitalized after the Rising and led by Countess Markievicz, Cumann na mBan took a leading role in popularising the memory of the 1916 leaders, organising prisoner relief agencies and later in opposing conscription and internment. They took a lead role in organising the Lá na mBan mass anti-conscription protest on 9 June 1918.

Cumann na mBan members canvassed for Sinn Féin in the 1918 general election, in which Countess Markievicz was elected Teachta Dála (member of Dáil Éireann, the parliament of Ireland). Jailed at the time, she became the Minister for Labour of the Irish Republic from 1919 to 1922.

Although the organization was declared illegal in 1918 and suppressed by the authorities in 1919, during the Anglo-Irish War, its members were active. They provided medical assistance to wounded Volunteers, reported atrocities committed by the Black and Tans, travelled the country on intelligence gathering and communications missions. They hid arms and provided safe houses for volunteers, helped run the Dáil Courts and local authorities, and in the production of the Irish Bulletin, official newspaper of the Irish Republic.

In 1920 all members were required to take the following pledge:

I pledge myself to support, and to defend to the best of my ability, the Irish Republic, and to uphold the aims and objectives of Cumann na mBan, and to keep strictly secret all matters relating to Cumann na mBan and the IRA.

In the Irish elections of May 1921, Markievicz was joined by fellow Cumann na mBan members Mary MacSwiney, Ada English and Kathleen Clarke as Teachtaí Dála.

== Civil War and after ==
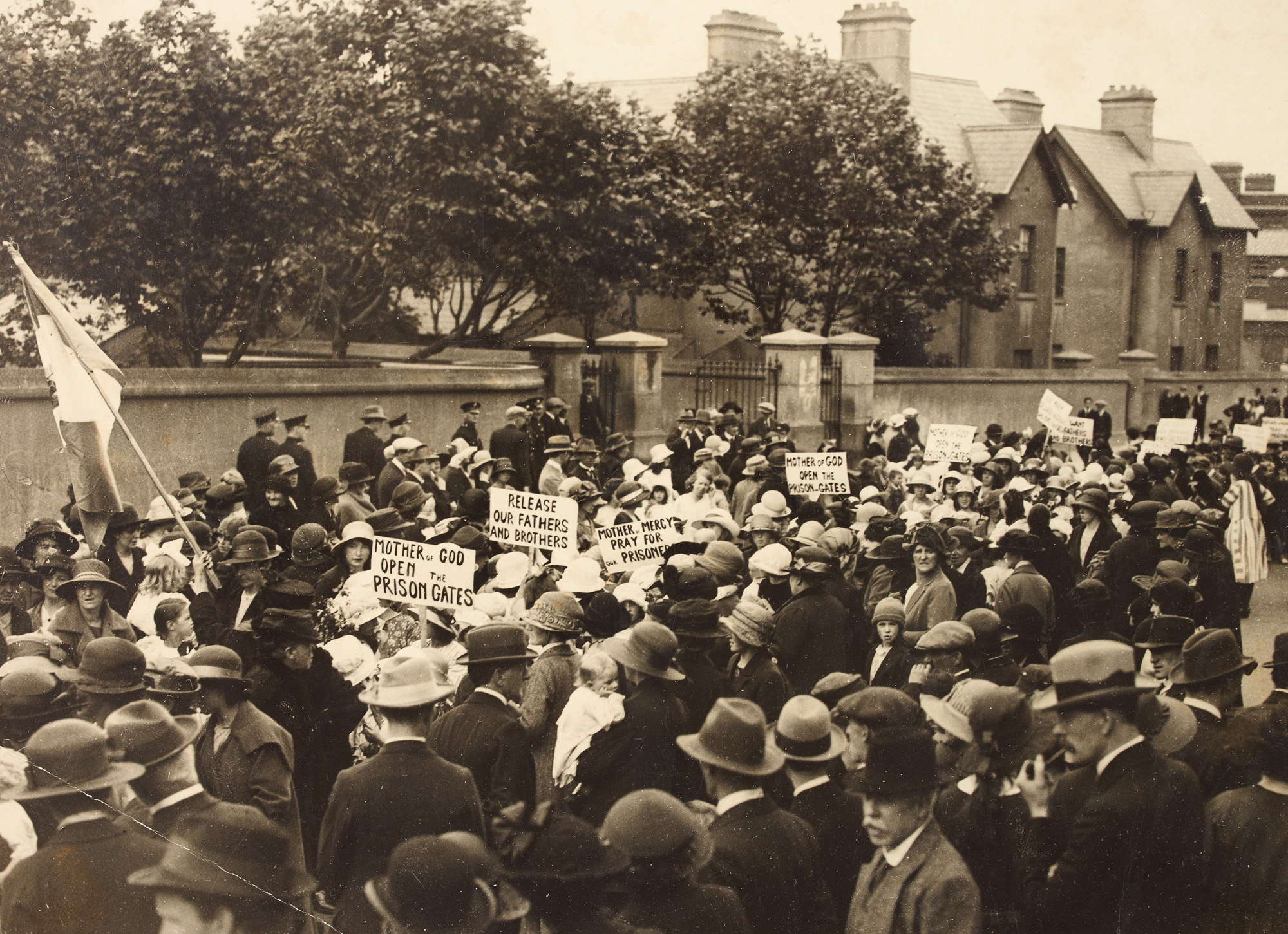
Cumann na mBan protest outside Mountjoy Prison, 23 July 1921

The October 1921 Cumann na mBan convention in Dublin was presided over by Constance Markievicz. She spoke of the upcoming treaty negotiations in London: "This is a time for action not talk, but we must think about the future. Don't think it is going to be peace. Go out and work as if the war was going to break out again next week." On 7 January 1922 the Anglo-Irish Treaty was approved by the Second Dáil by a close vote of 64–57. On 5 February a convention was held to discuss this, and 419 Cumann na mBan members voted against as opposed to 63 in favour. In the ensuing Civil War, its members largely supported the anti-Treaty Republican forces. Over 400 of its members were imprisoned by the forces of the Provisional government which became in December 1922 the Irish Free State. Some of those who supported the Treaty changed the name of their branches to Cumann na Saoirse, while others retained their name but gave allegiance to the Free State Government.

The government of the Irish Free State banned the organisation in January 1923 and opened up Kilmainham Jail as a detention prison for suspect women.

In February 1923, 23 women members of Cumann na mBan went on hunger strike for 34 days over the arrest and imprisonment without trial of Irish republican prisoners (see 1923 Irish Hunger Strikes). That strike resulted in the release of the women hunger-strikers. In March 1923, 97 women went on hunger strike in Kilmainham Gaol after all of their privileges had been denied without explanation (that hunger strike ended later in the month with the restoration of privileges).

When Éamon de Valera left Sinn Féin to form Fianna Fáil, Markievicz joined the new party, presiding at its launch in April 1926. She was obliged to leave Cumann na mBan, which continued to be associated with the IRA. Much of the membership followed her; Máire Comerford, who was brought onto the executive that month, reflected in later years that it "was now a greatly weakened organisation, and one that now, as a result of sheer inertia, gathered speed downhill". Eithne Coyle was elected president, and retained the post for 15 years. In 1939, 13 years into her presidency, the IRA launched a bombing campaign in Britain. Coyle—who disapproved of the "bombing of women and children in England"—tendered her resignation, which was turned down several times before being accepted in 1941. From then the presidency was vacant until 1947, when Margaret Langsdorf took the post.

== Deaths of Cumann na mBan members ==
- Josephine "Josie" McGowan, aged 20 died as a result of a beating by a police constable at an anti internment rally in Dublin on 22 September 1918.
- Margaret Keogh, aged 19, was killed on 10 July 1921 (the night before the Truce came into effect). She was trying to remove arms from her home in Irishtown, Dublin, while Black and Tan raids were being carried out. One of the bullets fell in the fire, exploded, and hit her, fatally wounding her. She was the only Cumann na mBan member to be killed in the War of Independence.
- Margaret McAnaney was accidentally shot dead by an IRA Volunteer at Burnfoot, County Donegal on 31 May 1922.
- On that same day Margaret McElduff died of an accidental gunshot wound in County Tyrone.
- On 4 August 1922 Mary Hartney died as a result of an Irish Free State Army artillery barrage in the town of Adare, County Limerick.
- On 18 November 1922 Lily Bennett was shot and killed at a Republican Prisoners Defense Committee public rally on O'Connell Street, Dublin.
- On 8 April 1923 a Free State soldier shot and killed Cumann na mBan member Margaret "Maggie" Dunne (aged 26) in Adrigole, West Cork, in an apparent act of reprisal.
- Annie Hogan from Cratloe, County Clare died as a result of a hunger strike in Kilmainham jail. She had been released in September 1923 and died a short time later.

== Presidents ==
| No. | Image | Name | Assumed office | Left office |
|---|---|---|---|---|
| 1. | | Jennie Wyse Power | 1915 | 1916 |
| 2. | | Countess Markievicz | 1916 | 1926 |
| 3. | | Eithne Coyle O'Donnell | 1926 | 1941 |
| | | Vacant | 1941 | 1947 |
| 4. | | Margaret Langsdorf | 1947 | 1956 |

== Other prominent members ==
- Elizabeth Bloxham
- Margaret Buckley
- May Caffrey, mother of Ruairí Ó Brádaigh
- Ethna Carbery
- Winifred Carney
- Kathleen Clarke, wife of Tom Clarke
- Madge Clifford
- Mary Colum
- Máire Comerford
- Lil Conlon
- Anne, Lily and Eileen Cooney
- Marcella Cosgrave
- Leslie de Barra, wife of Tom Barry
- Charlotte Despard
- Margaret Dobbs
- Louise Gavan Duffy
- Emily and Eilis Elliott
- Ada English
- Anna Fahy
- May Gibney
- Máire Gill
- Alice Ginnell, wife of Laurence Ginnell
- Julia Grenan
- Nell Humphreys
- Sheila Humphreys
- Dorothy Macardle
- Sorcha MacMahon
- Rose MacNamara
- Mary McSwiney
- Nora Connolly O'Brien
- Eva O'Flaherty
- Anno O'Rahilly, sister of The O'Rahilly
- Nancy O'Rahilly, wife of The O'Rahilly
- Marie Perolz
- Fiona Plunkett
- Catherine Rooney
- Min Ryan
- Margaret Skinnider
- Lucy Agnes Smyth
- Estella Solomons
- Brigid Lyons Thornton
- Ella Young
- Kathleen Balfe

== Later history ==
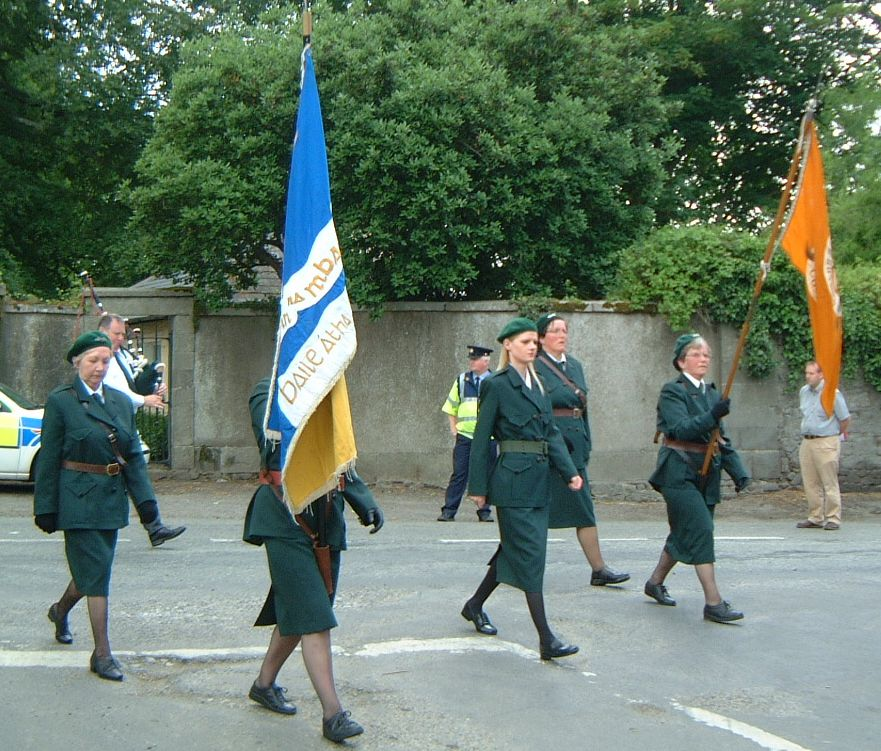
Republican Sinn Féin linked Cumann na mBan at Bodenstown in 2004.

In 1968 a dispute arose between the conservative Cumann na mBan and the left-wing leadership of the IRA about the carrying of a Connolly Youth Movement banner at a Wolfe Tone commemoration at Bodenstown Graveyard. The IRA leadership declared that Cumann na mBan had been disbanded, while allowing women to join the IRA for the first time. Cumann na mBan responded that only it could disband itself, and stopped taking part in IRA and Sinn Féin events. Cumann na mBan supported the Provisional wing in the 1969/70 split in the IRA and Sinn Féin, and over the next ten years, ten members were killed—a number of them in premature explosions—the most prominent being Máire Drumm, then vice-president of Sinn Féin, who was shot dead by loyalists in 1976. During internment (1971–1975), the roles of the interned IRA men were filled by Cumann na mBan members, who took actions such as setting fire to buildings.

In the late 1970s, a new, younger Provisional leadership again attempted to disband Cumann na mBan, but this was again rejected by the membership, and the organisation remained independent. In 1986, Cumann na mBan opposed the decision by the republican leadership to drop the policy of abstentionism; it aligned itself closely with Ruairí Ó Brádaigh's newly-formed party, Republican Sinn Féin (RSF). In 1995, when Josephine Hayden was jailed for six years on arms charges, she was a member of Cumann na mBan and joint secretary of RSF.

Cumann na mBan continues in existence as a dissident republican organisation; its executive meets on a regular basis. It is a proscribed organisation in the United Kingdom under the Terrorism Act 2000.

== Sources ==
- Conlon, Lil (1969). Cumann na mBan and the Women of Ireland 1913–1925. Kilkenny: Kilkenny People.
- Anonymous, 'Cumann na mBan in Easter Week: Tribute from a Hostile Source', Wolfe Tone Annual, undated.
- Boylan, Henry, (ed.), A Dictionary of Irish Biography (Dublin 1999).
- Comerford, Marie (2021). On Dangerous Ground A Memoir of the Irish Revolution. Dublin: Lilliput Press. ISBN 9781843518198.
- Coxhead, Elizabeth, Daughters of Erin (Gerrard's Cross 1985).
- Daly, Madge, 'Gallant Cumann na mBan of Limerick', in Limerick Fighting Story 1916-1921 (Kerry 1948), p. 201-5.
- Fallon, Charlotte, 'Civil War Hungerstrikes: Women and Men', Eire, vol.22, 1987.
- Haverty, Anne (1988). Constance Markievicz: Irish Revolutionary. London: Pandora. ISBN 0-86358-161-7.
- Cumann na mBan With Captions May 19 2020. Media Collections Online. Indiana University. 2020.
- Matthews, Ann (2010). Renegades: Irish Republican Women 1900-1922. Mercier Press Ltd. ISBN 978-1856356848.
- McCallum, Christi (2005). 'And They'll March with Their Brothers to Freedom': Cumann na mBan, Nationalism, and Women's Rights in Ireland, 1900–1923 (Master of Arts thesis). Florida State University. Archived from the original on 21 September 2024.
- Macardle, Dorothy (1965). The Irish Republic. New York: Farrar, Straus and Giroux.
- McCarthy, Cal, Cumann na mBan and the Irish Revolution (Dublin 2007)
- McKillen, Beth, 'Irish Feminism and National Separatism, 1914-23' Eire-Ireland 17 (1982).
- Markievicz, Countess Constance, Cumann na mBan 11, no.10, 1926.
- Meehan, Helen, 'Ethna Carbery: Anna Johnston McManus', Donegal Annual, No.45, 1993.
- O'Daly, Nora, 'Cumann na mBan in Stephens' Green and in the College of Surgeons', An t-Oglach, April 1926.
- Ó Ruairc, Pádraig Óg (September 2018). "Centenary: The women who died for Ireland". History Ireland.
- Ó Ruairc, Pádraig Óg (2020). "The women who died for Ireland". In Gibney, John (ed.). The Irish War of Independence and Civil War. Pen and Sword History. ISBN 9781526757982.
- Pašeta, Senia (2013). Irish Nationalist Women, 1900–1918. Cambridge: Cambridge University Press. ISBN 9781107729797.
- Reynolds, M, 'Cumann na mBan in the GPO', An t-Oglach, (March 1926).
- Ui Chonail, Eilis Bean, 'A Cummann na mBan recalls Easter Week', The Capuchin Annual, 1996.
- Ward, Margaret, 'Marginality and Militancy: Cumann na mBan, 1914-1936', in Austen Morgan and Bob Purdie (eds.), Ireland: Divided Nation, Divided Class (London 1980).
- Ward, Margaret (1995). Unmanageable Revolutionaries. Pluto Press. doi:10.2307/j.ctt18mbdpc.7.
