= George Lennon =

Irish Republican Army leader

- Born: 25 May 1900; Dungarvan, County Waterford, Ireland
- Died: 20 February 1991 (aged 90); Rochester, New York, U.S.
- Spouse: May Sibbald
- Military career
- Allegiance: Irish Republic
- Branch: Irish Volunteers; Irish Republican Army (1919–1922); Anti-Treaty IRA
- Rank: Vice Commanding Officer/Commanding Officer ASU
- Units: Fianna Éireann; Waterford Brigade
- Conflicts: Irish War of Independence; Irish Civil War

George Lennon (25 May 1900 – 20 February 1991) was an Irish Republican Army leader during the Irish War of Independence and the Irish Civil War.

== Background and early Republican activities ==
George Gerard Lennon was born in Dungarvan, County Waterford on 25 May 1900. His parents were George Crolly Lennon, manager of the local gas works, and Ellen (Shanahan) Lennon. He was the second of five siblings. At the time of the 1911 census, the family lived on Grattan Square, Dungarvan in a two-storey home at 81 O'Connell Street, Dungarvan. As a member of Na Fianna Eireann he and companion "Barney" Dalton were arrested for activating an improvised explosive device (I.E.D) along the Dungarvan quay. West Waterford O/C P.C. O'Mahony listed him, in October 1914, as the fourteen year old "Adjutant" of the newly formed Dungarvan Volunteers. An Irish Republican Brotherhood (I.R.B.) circle of twenty, organised by O'Mahony, included Lennon, Pax Whelan and Dan Fraher, all later prominent during the ensuing War of Independence.

== Irish Volunteers and IRA ==
During the 1916 Irish Rebellion Lennon and other local Irish Republicans occupied the Dungarvan Post Office. After the Easter Rising (in which he and Pax Whelan stopped a train in a futile search for arms), Lennon left Abbeyside School just prior to his sixteenth birthday to devote himself full time to the Irish Republican cause. Imprisoned for the first time, (theft of a soldier's Lee-Enfield rifle) as a seventeen year old, at Ballybricken Prison, Waterford City, he was "on the run" for nearly a year before being captured and sentenced at Lismore Court House to Cork Male Gaol. Incarcerated with Charlie Daly of Kerry and Sean Moylan he was released prematurely, due to ill health at the time of the third outbreak of Spanish Influenza, in May 1919.

Lennon served as West Waterford Vice Commanding Officer under Pax Whelan. With Liam Lynch on 7 September 1919, Lennon took part in the first attack, since Easter Week 1916, on British military forces at Fermoy's Wesleyan Church. In May 1920 he participated in "one of the fiercest of all barracks attacks..." directed at the Royal Irish Constabulary (RIC) in Kilmallock, County Limerick. After this, Lennon was attached to the East Limerick Flying Column (the first organised of "men on the run") and took part in a series of attacks on Crown forces including Browns Pike, Ardmore, Dungarvan Railway Station, County Waterford. Lennons men were also involved in the attacks at Bruree, County Limerick and Kildorrery, County Cork with Tom Barry (Irish republican). He also served with the West Limerick Column and, at Liam Lynch's request, helped organise the famed Cork No. 2 Column portrayed in Sean Keating's iconic Men of the South.

Circa September/October 1920 he took command of the West Waterford Flying Column and served as the youngest leader of a Flying Column. Operating from the Comeragh Mountains and the Drum Hills, Lennon, with Great War veteran John Riordan, planned and led the Piltown Cross ambush on 1 November 1920 (the date of the execution, in Dublin, of Kevin Barry) in which a British Army unit was overwhelmed and armaments seized. In 1921 the flying column took part in the unsuccessful Pickardstown ambush near Tramore and the Burgery ambush in March 1921. Capturing childhood acquaintance RIC Sergeant Hickey, he had him executed as a "police spy".

In all, Lennon was involved in some 17 engagements against R.I.C. and British forces, not including gun-running activities and arms seizures. The activities of Lennon's column resulted in nearly a thousand British soldiers being deployed to Waterford, along with over two hundred RIC and Royal Marines. The local newspaper in 1924 referenced "...in the struggles that took place he had many hair-breadth escapes". Following the 11 July Truce Lennon was the designated IRA Brigade Liaison Officer for County Waterford. IRA Liaison Officers duties were to smooth out any difficulties that might arise between the IRA and the Free State authorities.

In January 1922, staying at Vaughan's Hotel with I.R.A Chief of Staff Liam Lynch (killed by Free State Forces,10 April 1923) of Cork and Charlie Daly of Kerry ("Drumboe Martyr "executed 14 March 1923) he was present at the Mansion House when the Dáil voted to accept the Anglo-Irish Treaty. In the subsequent Irish Civil War, he took the anti-Treaty side, leading his men into a generally non-receptive Waterford City. He fought at the Battle of Waterford of July 1922 (See Irish Free State offensive) against former comrade and East Waterford Commanding Officer Paddy Paul. The first and last shots of the battle were fired from his command at Ballybricken Gaol. Retreating westward his men occupied Mount Congreve. He subsequently resigned in a letter to Liam Deasy when it became obvious that the war would prove ruinous for Ireland.

== In the US ==
Lennon emigrated to New York City in 1927 where he was employed in the insurance and hotel businesses. Lennon was also the business manager and contributor (aka "George Crolly") to the short-lived art/literary magazine The Irish Review edited by Ulster poet Joseph Campbell. An earlier Irish Review had been published in Dublin by Joseph Mary Plunkett. Listed as managing editor in 1934 was his brother-in-law, George H. Sherwood. The magazine included portrayals of the works of Sean Keating and Power O'Malley, born Michael Augustine Power in Dungarvan. Out of his New York City apartment, he campaigned for pensions via the West Waterford Brigade Old I.R.A Men's Association.

He was naturalized as a United States citizen on 19 December 1933. Listed as sponsors were former Free State officers General Prout and Colonel Patrick Paul.

== Return to Ireland ==
In poor health, both mentally and physically, he returned to Ireland in August 1936 where he lived a peripatetic County Dublin life centered on Rathfarnham living with the family of An Phoblacht Deputy Editor Geoffrey Coulter. He eventually secured, through Republican connections, the position of inspector with the Irish Tourist Association (I.T.A.), directing the "Irish Topographical Survey" viewed as " one of the most important and lasting projects carried out" during World War II. He served as the County Waterford representative on the executive of Liam Deasy's All Ireland Old I.R.A. Men's Organization. His last position in the Free State was Secretary to The National Planning Conference (1943–1944) which mounted a Mansion House exhibition 25 April to 5 May 1944. His return to Ireland was detailed in the novel "Dead Star's Light" (1938) written by Una Troy Walsh under the nom de plume of Elizabeth Connor. Troy and her husband, Joe Walsh were subsequently effectively expunged from the roles of their Clonmel parish church.

Although Lennon had many clerical antecedents, including O Leannain/O Luinin lay abbots (erenaghs) at County Fermanagh monasteries, Reverend George Crolly of Maynooth and noted Roman Catholic Archbishop Primate of Ireland (1835–1849) William Crolly, he was critical of the "special position" of the Catholic Church in Free State Ireland. Lennon also spoke out against the Church and the Ancient Order of Hibernians for their positive outlook on the Fascists in 1936 Spain.

Introduced to May Sibbald (b.1909), by May's brother in law Geoffrey Coulter, the pair were married outside the Roman Catholic Church (York Road Presbyterian Church, Dun Laoghaire). May was the secretary to Government Minister Sean MacEntee, Fianna Fáil T.D. In seeming violation of the Ne Temere, their only child, Ivan, was baptized as a Presbyterian in Dún Laoghaire.

During the "Emergency" World War II period he made contact with English Poet Laureate to be John Betjeman who, as a British Embassy "press attache", had earlier been marked for assassination as a spy by the I.R.A. Betjeman had written a number of poems based on his experiences in West Waterford including The Irish Unionist's Farewell to Greta Hellstrom, which ended each stanza with the refrain "... Dungarvan in the rain".

Suffering from "reactive depression" (neurasthenia or PTSD) and pulmonary disease (consumption or T.B.) attributable to military service in Óglaigh na hÉireann" (I.R.A.), Lennon was belatedly granted, in perpetuity, a "wound pension" effective 22 May 1944. Government Minister MacEntee, at May Sibbald's written request, had successfully interceded on behalf of Lennon's application. This was in addition to his 1935 military service pension. According to Professor Diarmaid Ferriter: "An updated medical report in 1944 suggested he was suffering from ‘reactive depression (psychasthenia) and pulmonary disease attributable to military service in IRA,’ and he was estimated to have an 80 per cent disability. He had ‘recurrent depression, occasional bouts of insomnia and feeling of constriction and nervousness in upper abdomen.’ He could only do work of ‘limited responsibility’ such as cashier jobs. What was most interesting about Lennon's application was that it included substantial testimony on post-traumatic stress disorder, absent from many other applications. Ironically it took the evidence of a former British Army captain to impress on the Army Pensions Board the debilitating nature of a condition that was not widely understood at that stage." Siobhra Aiken's 2023 book " Spiritual Wounds" dealt with the trauma Lennon experienced as a result of his guerrilla days. Lennon had earlier, in 1941, been awarded the 1917-1921 Service Medal, with a 'COMRAC' bar to indicate combat service.

== Return to the US ==
Unemployed, from the summer of 1944, he re-emigrated, for the second and final time in early 1946, on one of the first post war flights out of the newly opened Shannon Aeroport; ultimately moving to Rochester, New York where he secured an entry level position with the Eastman Kodak Company. In May 1947 "Dead Star's Light" was performed on the Abbey stage as" The Dark Road". In the play, it was noted that in 1930s Ireland "heroes are out of fashion" and that some viewed him (aka protagonist "John Davern") as "a communist, an anti-cleric, an agitator, a gun-man...." His wife and son reluctantly left Ireland to join him in late 1947; departing from Dún Laoghaire aboard the Princess Maud for Holyhead, ultimately bound for New York City on the Cunarder Mauritania via Southampton.

In his later years, Lennon became attracted to the religious tenets of the Unitarians, Quakers and, through a small study group, Zen Buddhism, whose precepts he generally adhered to. With Chester Carlson ( inventor of electrophotography) and others he was a founding member of the Rochester Zen Center in 1967. Lennon was a pacifist and anti-war activist during the Vietnam War. Rochester artist and friend Ruth Carver painted his portrait which was displayed in the mid-1960s at Rochester's Memorial Art Gallery. In the late 1950s, he wrote an unpublished play "Down by the Glen Side" and finished in the early 1970s, a short remembrance entitled "Trauma in Time". Widowed in 1983, he died, largely unknown, on 20 February 1991, aged 90.

== Controversy over legacy ==
Due arguably to Lennon's stand regarding positions taken by the Irish Catholic Church and his emigration to the US, Irish military historian Terence O'Reilly noted that "incredibly, George Lennon has until recently been effectively airbrushed from Irish history, meriting only fleeting references in a few accounts of the time, although the 1947 Abbey Theatre play and earlier novel were transparently based upon his life."

In 2009 it emerged that a Republican Sinn Féin Cumann had named the Waterford branch of its organization after George Lennon without the permission of his family. In 2010 the Lennon name was deleted and replaced by that of Thomas McElwee, a blanket protester and hunger striker.

This, in turn, brought to light other issues, including the refusal by a West Waterford Republican organization, originally established by Lennon in 1930s New York City, to allow his ashes to be scattered amongst his comrades at the IRA Republican plot in Kilrossanty, County Waterford. Prior to this denial, in December 2008, the Department of Defense refused a military presence at the proposed ceremony. A possible dispersal of ashes at the family's Roman Catholic parish church of St. Mary's in Dungarvan was complicated by an inability to locate the plots, although 1920s newspaper accounts and anecdotal evidence clearly note his family being buried there. In that he was a founding member with Chet Carlson ("Xerography") of the Rochester Zen Center, his ashes were subsequently received by Zen Centers in Rochester and Surry, Maine. July 2014 witnessed the installation of a plaque at St. Mary's noting the nearby presence of the remains of his parents (George Crolly Lennon and Ellen Shanahan Lennon) and grandparents (James Lennon/Mary Anne Crolly Lennon).

== Belated recognition ==
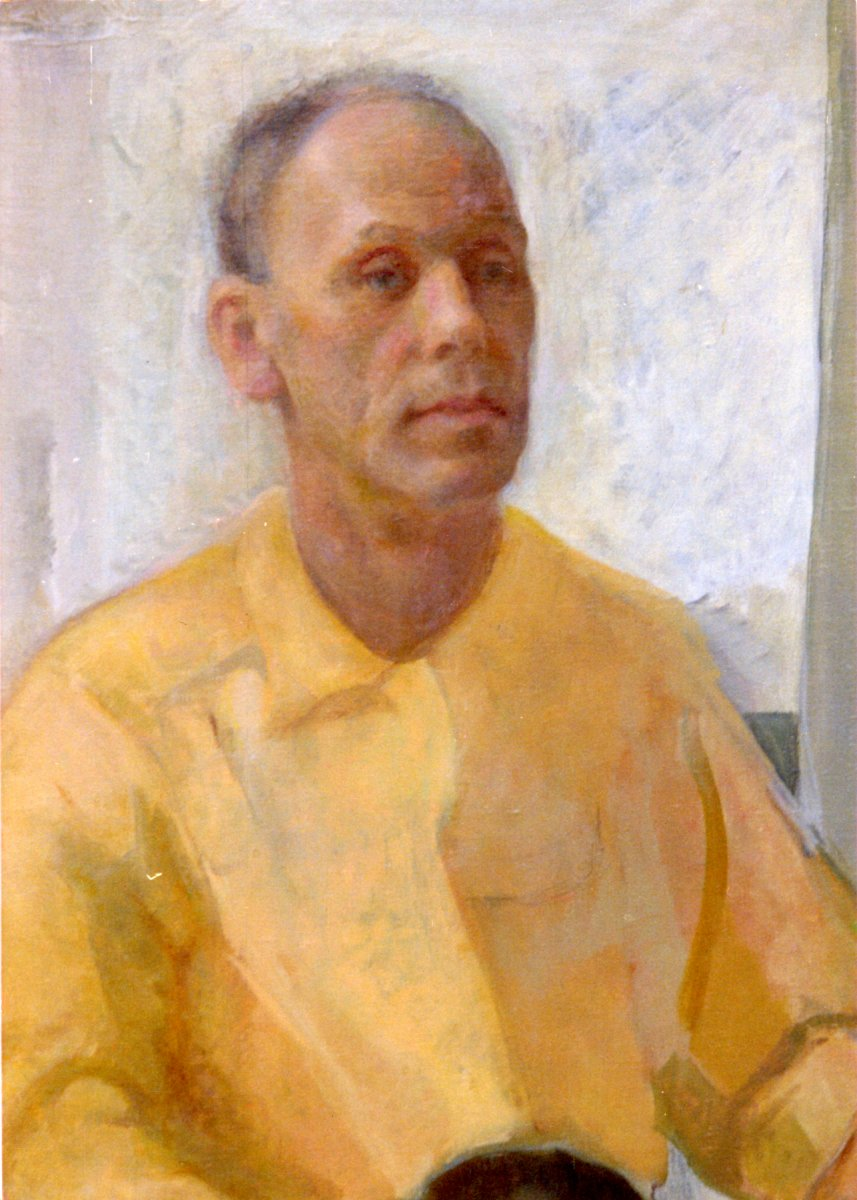
Portrait by Ruth Carver

In September 2009, under the auspices of the Waterford County Museum in Dungarvan, talks and an exhibit entitled "The Road to Independence" prominently noted Lennons role in attaining a measure of Irish independence. This event coincided with the release of Rebel Heart: George Lennon Flying Column Commander by Terence O'Reilly and Lennons in Time by his son.

In 2010, events at St. John Fisher College, Pittsford, New York, included a visual presentation ("George Lennon: I.R.A. Rebel to Zen Pacifist") and his oil portrait by Ruth Carver was included in an exhibit of Irish art at Rochester's St. John Fisher University entitled "Forgotten Ireland". In early 2011 a documentary film of Lennon's life was filmed, under the direction of Ardmore's Cormac Morel, in various locales in West Waterford. The documentary, "O Chogadh go Siochain: Saol George Lennon", shown on Irish television (TG4) in September 2011, had an American premiere in the Autumn of 2011 at the Irish Film Feis, sponsored by the Rochester, New York Chapter of the Irish American Cultural Institute. Presented in Dungarvan, County Waterford in November 2012 was Muiris O'Keeffe's play, Days of Our Youth, dealing with the impact upon Lennon of the 1920 Piltown Ambush and the 1921 Burgery Ambush. In conjunction with the play, the Waterford County Museum presented a series of lectures featuring Dr. Pat McCarthy of the Military History Society of Ireland and Lennon's son, Ivan, who detailed his post 1987 investigation into his father's role in the development of the Irish Free State. National Heritage Week 2015 in Tramore and 2018 in Dungarvan witnessed a PowerPoint presentation of some 110 photographs entitled George Lennon: A Forgotten I.R.A. Commandant. Simon Maguire of Newstalk FM conducted a 2021 interview with Ivan entitled "From Rebel Leader to Peace Activist: The Making of George Lennon." 2022 witnessed a similar interview with Liam O'Sullivan of Trasna na Tire. A relaunch of Terrence O'Reilly's 2009 "Rebel Heart," with a presentation ceremony in Dungarvan to his son, is scheduled for the summer of 2023. The following year saw the release of John Foley's documentary The Aftermath - the Long Shadows of the Civil War in Waterford.

== Sources ==
- Trauma in Time by George Lennon 1970
- Lennons in Time OCLC 1017569341, by Ivan Lennon.
- O'Reilly, Terence (2009). Rebel Heart: George Lennon: Flying Column Commander. Mercier. ISBN 978-1-85635-649-7.
- McCarthy, Pat (2015). The Irish Revolution, 1912-23: Waterford. Four Courts Press. ISBN 978-1-84682-410-4.
- Cry of the Curlew: A History of the Deise Brigade IRA and the War of independence, by Tommy Mooney.
- The Deise Divided: A History of the Waterford Brigade IRA and the Civil War, by Tommy Mooney.
- The Comeraghs: Gunfire and Civil War, Comeragh Publications, 2003, by Séan & Síle Murphy.
- The Men Will Talk to Me, West Cork Interviews, by Ernie O'Malley, Cork: Mercier Press, 2015
