= Fiona Plunkett =

Irish Republican activist (1896–1977)

- Plunkett in January 1966 during an interview with RTÉ
- Born: 11 January 1896; Dublin, Ireland
- Died: 1977 (aged 80–81); Dublin, Ireland
- Education: Mount Anville Secondary School
- Father: George Noble Plunkett
- Relatives: 6 siblings, including Joseph Mary Plunkett (brother) and George Oliver Plunkett (brother)

Fiona Plunkett (11 January 1896 – 12 July 1977) was an Irish republican involved in the organisation of the Easter 1916 Rising and a leading member of Cumann na mBan.

== Early and personal life ==
Birth Certificate

Fiona Plunkett, born Josephine Plunkett on 11 January 1896, and the name later shortened to Fiona, then Fi, was the daughter of George Noble Plunkett and Josephine Cranny. She grew up on 26 Upper Fitzwilliam Street. She was the youngest of seven children: Philomena, Mary, Geraldine, Jack, George and Joseph Plunkett, who all took part in the Easter Rising. Joseph was a signatory of the Proclamation of the Republic and was executed after the Rising.

Her father was the curator of the National Museum of Ireland, however he was forced to step down and exiled to Oxford following both his and his children's actions during the 1916 Rising. He later became a politician, being a member of the then newly formed Sinn Féin party. Although her family was heavily involved with politics, Plunkett only established her political career at the age of 26 during the Irish Civil War. Plunkett was engaged three times but never married, and died at the age of 81, in 1977 in a Dublin hospital of natural causes.

== Education ==
26 Fitzwilliam Street Upper Dublin

Plunkett sat in on her brothers' lessons, in an attempt to receive an education. She briefly attended the classy Convent of the Sacred Heart in Leeson Street and another of the order's convents, Mount Anville. She had access to the library of her father, which allowed her to read on various topics.

== Political views ==
Plunkett's political beliefs were influenced by her father and three brothers. Her Irish republican ideals would influence her actions throughout her life. As a girl, she was one of the group that provided food relief to the workers starved by the 1913 Dublin Lock-out.

In 1916 she served in the women's military group Cumann na mBan, and indirectly participated in the 1916 Easter Rising as an organiser.

Her brother Joseph was executed for his leadership in the Rising; his younger brothers George and Jack were imprisoned in England afterwards.

In 1917 Cumann na mBan began regrouping. Memberships increased as did the membership of Sinn Féin. New branches of Cumann na mBan were created and old ones reformed. Nine executives were chosen to represent Cumann na mBan: Plunkett, Nancy O'Rahilly and her daughter, Margaret Pearse, Áine Ceannt, Kathleen Clarke, Nancy Wyse Power, Mary McSwiney and Madge Daly. The mothers, sisters, wives and daughters of the Rising's leaders perceived themselves as sidelined, with Plunkett resisting the move to amalgamate them into Sinn Féin. She remained particularly close to her sister-in-law Grace Gifford.

In 1926, Plunkett was tried and imprisoned for her involvement in a raid of the home of Edward Levi, was part of an ongoing campaign against Dublin moneylenders. Three IRA members demanded that Levi hand over his account books. Plunkett, Domhall O'Donohue and Mick Price were charged for assisting in the formation of an illegal military force and possession of arms, ammunition and treasonable documents.

In 1942, Plunkett stepped onto a platform during a commemoration of the Rising at Arbor Hill church, condemning the Irish government's treatment of political prisoners (her brother Jack being a prisoner at the time, on hunger strike in Arbor Hill Prison, next to the church) under Éamon de Valera's authority. References to this "Plunkett Incident" were censored in the Irish press in the following days.

In 1971 Plunkett wrote a letter to the editor of The Irish Times criticising the contemporary truce in Northern Ireland, urging the Irish people to stand up against "British domination". She went on to say that any celebrations for attained peace while Britain remained in Ireland were a "hollow mockery" of the Irish people. In 1976, she and her longtime friend and fellow Cumann na mBan leader Maire Comerford were prosecuted for her participation in a banned commemoration of the 1916 Rising at the GPO.

== Death and legacy ==
Plunkett died on 12 July 1977 at the age of 81. She was buried in Glasnevin cemetery, in the Republican plot. Plunketts's legacy and life is recounted in All in Blood: a memoir by her elder sister Geraldine Dillon.
