= Eilís Dillon =

Irish writer (1920 – 1994)

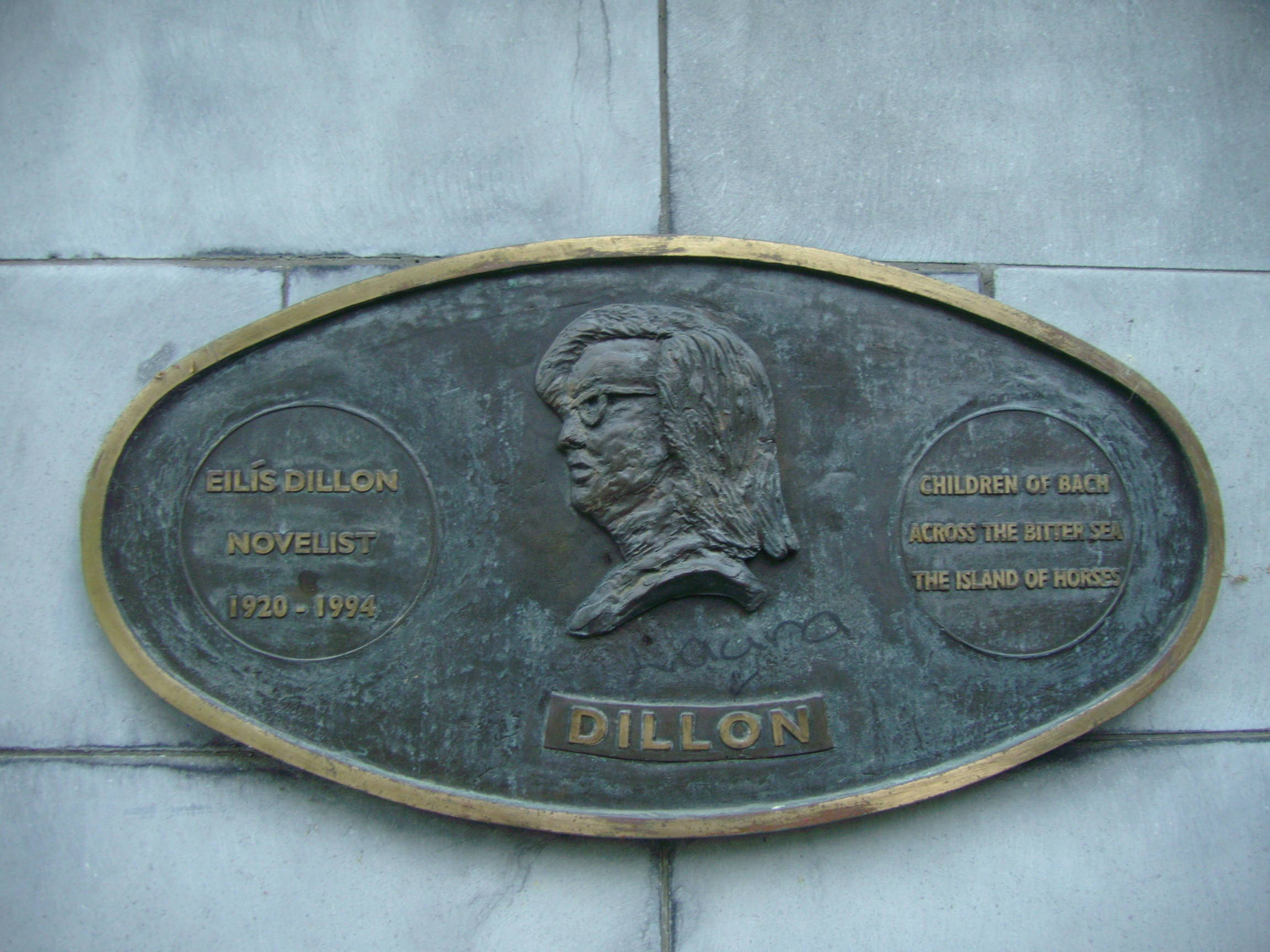
- Plaque in Saint Patrick's Park, Dublin
- Born: 7 March 1920; Galway, Ireland
- Died: 19 July 1994 (aged 74); Dublin, Ireland
- Resting place: Clara, County Offaly
- Occupation: writer
- Spouse(s): Cormac Ó Cuilleanáin; Vivian Mercier
- Children: Eiléan Ní Chuilleanáin; Cormac Ó Cuilleanáin; Máire
- Relatives: Joseph Mary Plunkett (uncle)
- Writing career
- Language: Irish, English
- Genres: Children's books Teenage novels
- Notable awards: Bisto Book of the Year Award (1991)

Eilís Dillon FRSL (7 March 1920 – 19 July 1994) was an Irish author of 50 books. Her work has been translated into 14 languages.

== Early life ==
Dillon was the third of five children of Professor Thomas Dillon and his wife Geraldine née Plunkett, who was the sister of Joseph Mary Plunkett. She was raised at Dangan House outside of Galway City before moving to the small fishing village of Barna. She attended the local primary school where she became proficient in Irish and gained an intimate knowledge of Connemara traditions. Dillon's family was involved in Irish revolutionary politics; her uncle Joseph Mary Plunkett was a signatory of the 1916 Proclamation and was executed after the Easter Rising.

Educated by the Ursuline nuns in Sligo, she worked briefly in the hotel and catering trade. In 1940 she married Cormac Ó Cuilleanáin, an academic from University College Cork and 17 years her senior. They had three children: the Irish poet and Trinity College Dublin professor Eiléan Ní Chuilleanáin, Máire Ní Chuilleanáin, violinist with the London Philharmonic Orchestra who died in 1990, and Cormac Ó Cuilleanáin, also a Trinity professor, who writes novels as Cormac Millar.

== Early writing career ==
Dillon's first books were in Irish including An Choill Bheo, published in 1948, Oscar agus an Cóiste sé nEasóg in 1952 and Ceol na coille in 1955. After the success of The Lost Island, published in 1952, she wrote almost exclusively in English. Most of her books were aimed at teen readers with themes of self-discovery and problem-solving evident.

In 1964 she moved to Rome due to her husband's poor health. While there she acted as adviser to the International Commission on English in the Liturgy. She returned to Cork with her husband in 1969 where he died the following year. She continued to visit Italy over the next several years, setting some of her stories there including Living in Imperial Rome (1974) and The Five Hundred (1972), though these were not as popular as her Irish books. In 1974 she married the American-based critic and professor Vivian Mercier, dividing her time among California, Italy and Dublin.

== Later writing career ==
Dillon's adult fiction career began in 1953 with the publication of the detective novel Death at Crane's Court. This was followed by Sent to His Account in 1954 and Death in the Quadrangle in 1956. These novels are known for their depiction of contemporary Ireland. Over the following decade Dillon published many novels including The Bitter Glass (1959), Across the Bitter Sea (1973) and The Wild Geese (1981).

== Final years ==
In her later years, Dillon played a prominent role in Irish culture. She was a Fellow of the Royal Society of Literature and a member of Aosdána, served on the Irish Arts Council 1974–9, chaired the Irish Writers Union and the Irish Writers' Centre, and founded the Irish Children's Book Trust. In 1987 Dillon and her husband moved permanently to Dublin where she supported up-and-coming Irish authors. Her last story was Children of Bach published in 1993. Eilís Dillon died in Dublin in 1994 and is buried beside her second husband in Clara, County Offaly; a prize in her memory is given annually as part of the CBI Book of the Year Awards.
