= Provisional Government of Ireland (disambiguation) =

Provisional Government of Ireland may refer to:

- In Robert Emmet's 1803 rebellion, the notional body in whose name Emmett issued a proclamation of independence.
- In the Fenian Rising of 1867, the notional body in whose name a proclamation of independence was issued.
- Provisional Government of the Irish Republic in 1916.
- Provisional Government of Ireland in 1922.
- In Irish republican legitimatism, the IRA Army Council has been the provisional government since 1938.

== See also ==
- Ministry of Dáil Éireann, executive of the Irish Republic 1919–22, not recognised internationally
- Government of Ireland
- Provisional Government
