= Geraldine Plunkett Dillon =

Irish Republican activist

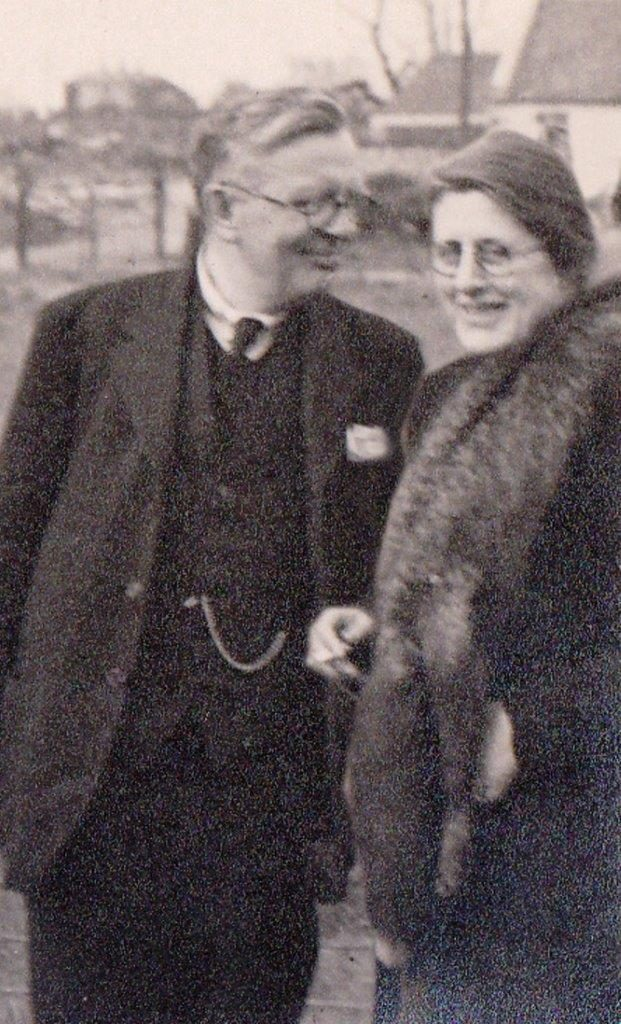
- Dillon with her husband in 1940
- Born: 1891; Dublin, Ireland
- Died: 13 May 1986 (aged 94–95); Dublin, Ireland
- Father: George Noble Plunkett
- Relatives: 6 siblings, including Joseph Mary Plunkett, Fiona Plunkett and George Oliver Plunkett

Geraldine "Gerry" Plunkett Dillon (1891–1986) was an Irish republican and member of Cumann na mBan, best known for her memoir All in the blood. She was a sister of Joseph Plunkett, a signatory of the 1916 Proclamation of the Irish Republic.

== Early life and family ==
Geraldine Plunkett Dillon, known to her family as Gerry, was born Geraldine Mary Germaine Plunkett in 1891 in Fitzwilliam Street, Dublin. She was the fourth child of the seven children of Count George Noble and Mary Josephine Plunkett (née Cranny). She had three sisters – Philomena, Mary, and Fiona – and three brothers: Jack, George and Joseph. The family lived in a number of houses including on Upper Fitzwilliam Street, Marlborough Road, and later on Belgrave Road. Throughout her life Dillon had a difficult relationship with her mother, recalling that at the age of 6, "I decided to hate my mother."

She cared for her brother Joseph after his return from travelling in 1912 when he had been hospitalised with influenza. They lived together at 17 Marlborough Road in Donnybrook, which was one of the family properties.

== Role in Irish independence ==
Her brother, Joseph, was a signatory of the 1916 Proclamation, and Dillon actively supported his involvement with the Irish Volunteers and the Irish Republican Brotherhood. She helped to smuggle gelignite and ammunition into Dublin by taking delivery of the two bags in February 1914 from Liam Mellowes. She was a friend of Michael Collins, whom she met through Joseph in 1915 to help her when she had been left to manage the family finances and property while her mother was visiting the United States. In 1916, Dillon was living with Joseph at Larkfield House in Kimmage, the grounds of which were used as an Irish Volunteers training camp. In the run-up to Easter 1916, the house was home to a large number of Volunteers who came from London, Liverpool, and Glasgow. Joseph gave her a pistol, which she carried continuously in her jacket.

On Easter Sunday 23 April 1916, she married Thomas Dillon, a chemistry lecturer whom she had met in University College Dublin, in Rathmines Church. Her brothers, George and Jack, were in attendance wearing their Volunteer uniforms, with Rory O'Connor was the best man. The wedding ceremony attracted the attention of the British forces, with a pair of "G-men" removed from the church by O'Connor and the Plunkett brothers. The wedding had been planned as a double wedding, with her brother Joseph planning to marry Grace Gifford, but he was occupied with the planning for Easter Monday. Dillon's husband was to take part in the events of Easter Rising, and was instructed to go to the Imperial Hotel on O'Connell Street on Easter Monday with Dillon after the wedding and to await orders there. The hotel was chosen specifically due to its view of the General Post Office, which was to be the centre of the Rising. As Thomas was a chemist, it was planned that he would be placed in charge of any chemical factories the Irish Volunteers captured to manufacture munitions and explosives, but this did not come to fruition. Instead, the couple watched the events unfolding from the hotel. When Rory O'Connor visited them to update them on progress, Dillon asked to be admitted into the GPO, but Joseph refused her permission. Instead, he ordered them back to Larkfield to start manufacturing explosives. They cycled back to the house through lines of British soldiers. The last time Dillon saw her brother was as she left the hotel when he was blowing up an empty tram on North Earl Street with a homemade bomb.

After Joseph's execution, the Plunkett siblings remained active in organisations such as the Irish Republican Army and Cumann na mBan. Dillon published a volume of her brother Joseph's poetry posthumously, a month after his execution in June 1916, The poems of Joseph Mary Plunkett, having been named as his literary executor. Dillon was the member of the Plunkett family who had the most interaction with her brother's widow, Grace. Grace lived with her at Larkfield after 1916. It is Dillon's account of Gifford that confirmed that she was pregnant at the time of her wedding, and that she later lost the pregnancy. Dillon was also unsure that her brother had been the father of the fetus.

Dillon was present at the first sitting of the Dáil at the Mansion House in January 1919. Her husband spent a great deal of the period of 1916 to 1922 imprisoned or hiding from the authorities due to his republican activities, including an internment from May 1918 to January 1919 in Gloucester prison. Dillon travelled to Gloucester having heard that the jail had been struck by the Spanish flu. She found her husband had been transferred to a hospital, and with the help of Michael Collins, had him and another prisoner released. When her husband was appointed Professor of Chemistry at University College, Galway, the family moved to the city. Dillon had been instrumental in securing this job, as Thomas had applied while still interned at Gloucester. They initially lived in Dangan House and later in Barna, where it was used for Sinn Féin Court sessions with her husband presiding as judge. In Galway, Dillon became a member of Cumann na mBan, and acted for Michael Collins as an intelligence agent. She organised and transmitted intelligence reports for the IRA brigade commanders in Connemara.

In Galway, the Dillons witnessed the violence from the Royal Irish Constabulary and the Black and Tans. Due to her husband's connections with the IRA, and her activities, their house was frequently raided. Dillon was arrested on Easter Monday 28 March 1921, and was imprisoned in Galway Gaol for the remainder of the Irish War of Independence after she was caught carrying literature from the Irish White Cross. The literature was delivered to her from Maire Comerford, a leading figure in the women's paramilitary organisation Cumann na mBan Her husband was already in hiding, so their children were left in the care of a servant, Peggy. After protested that her children were not allowed to live with her in the prison, as was usual at the time, the matter was raised in the House of Commons and she was released. Her daughter Eilís later recalled that by not being in prison with her mother, she had "lost her only chance of being able to boast I was imprisoned for my country." She was later awarded two medals: the Service Medal and the Truce Commemorative Medal.

== Other work and writing ==
Ó Brolcháin recounts some of Dillon's achievements in the preface to her edited memoir, including delivering a paper in the Royal Irish Academy in 1916 and contributing to the Encyclopedia Britannica for the article on dyes. Dillon also published a volume of poetry, Magnificat, and contributed to the Book of St Ultan. She was a founding member of Taibhdhearc na Gaillimhe, and the Galway Art Club, where she exhibited. In 1928 she made costumes for Micheál Mac Liammóir. The sculptor Oisín Kelly cited Dillon as responsible for his choice to become a sculptor.

== Death and legacy ==
After her husband's retirement from NUIG, they lived apart for a time, but later moved to Dublin to live with their daughter. Dillon died on 13 May 1986 in Dublin, and is buried with members of her family in Glasnevin Cemetery. Dillon had five children, Moya, Blanaid, Eilís, Michael, and Eoin. One son died at age three.

Dillon held a large collection of family papers, which contained documents from 1850, as well as keeping her own detailed notes and diaries up to her death in 1986. An edited edition of her memoir, All in the Blood, was published in 2006 and was edited by Honor Ó Brolcháin, her granddaughter.

A one-woman show, Mamó: A Story of Geraldine Plunkett Dillon, was written and performed by Isolde Ó Brolcháin Carmody, Dillon's great-granddaughter. Some of her papers are held in the National Library of Ireland.
