= Proclamation of the Republic =

Proclamation of the Republic may refer to:

- Proclamation of the Irish Republic, issued during the Easter Rising of 1916
- Proclamation of the Republic (Brazil), celebrated by a public holiday on November 15
