= Eva Philbin =

Irish chemist (1914–2005)

- Eva Philbin
- Born: Eva Maria Ryder; 4 January 1914; Ballina, County Mayo, Ireland
- Died: 24 June 2005 (aged 91)
- Citizenship: Ireland
- Education: University College Galway
- Spouse: John Madden Philbin
- Children: Eimear, Deirdre, Liam
- Scientific career
- Fields: Chemistry
- Workplaces: University College Dublin; Hygeia Limited
- Doctoral advisor: Thomas S. Wheeler
- Other academic advisors: Tom Dillon, Vlado Prelog

Eva Philbin (4 January 1914 – 24 June 2005) was an Irish chemist who became the first woman president of the Institute of Chemistry of Ireland. Her research focused on the biochemical properties of flavonoids, complex compounds found in plants.

== Early life and education ==
Born Eva Maria Ryder in Ballina, County Mayo, Ireland, she was the elder of two daughters of Kate, a business owner, and George Ryder. She attended the Convent of Mercy in Ballina, a local school, then received a scholarship to University College Galway where she received her bachelor's degree with first class honours in 1936. She remained there for her master's degree, which she earned working in carbohydrate chemistry with Thomas Dillon, identifying carbohydrates in seaweed.

== Career and research ==
After completing her master's degree, she stayed on at UCG as an assistant in the chemistry department for two years. In 1939, due to World War II, she changed paths to industrial chemistry and became chief chemist at the farm chemical manufacturer Hygeia Ltd in Galway. At Hygeia she was responsible for developing alternative sources for chemicals that were unavailable due to the war. During this time, she was also chief chemist at Cold Chon Ltd, a manufacturer of bituminous binders and road surfacing materials.

In 1945, Philbin joined the staff at University College, Dublin as demonstrator in the department of chemistry. There she collaborated with Thomas S. Wheeler, former Irish State Chemist, to establish an active research school in biochemistry. Philbin was subsequently promoted to assistant lecturer in 1949 and college lecturer in 1955. She began to publish on flavonoid chemistry in earnest in 1952, working on the Wessely-Moser rearrangement and Baker–Venkataraman rearrangement in relation to flavonoid compounds. She earned her Ph.D. in 1956, then had a brief stint as a visiting fellow at the Eidgenossische Polytechnikum Zurich with Vladimir Prelog, working on flavonoid stereochemistry. In 1958, she was awarded a doctorate of science (DSc) from the National University of Ireland in recognition of her contributions. Philbin was one of the first women science professors at UCD when she became an organic chemistry professor in 1962. In 1963, she took over as head of the chemistry department following the death of Wheeler, the previous department head. She continued to work on flavonoid stereochemistry and the compounds' role as potential anti-cancer agents through collaborations with researchers including Hugh Ryan and Elias James Corey. She retired from teaching in 1979 from her professorship, but continued to conduct some research.

Over her long career, Philbin became a fellow of the Royal Society of Chemistry and a member of the Council of the Royal Irish Academy and the Natural Science Council. Philbin became the first woman to chair the National Science Council, was the first female senior vice-president of the Royal Irish Academy, and was the first woman president of the Institute of Chemistry in 1966. Since 2007, the Institute of Chemistry of Ireland Annual Award for Chemistry lectures series has been named in her honor as the Eva Philbin Public Lecture Series.

Philbin's interests ranged beyond science, taking a strong interest in the treatment of those with learning difficulties, leading her to take up the chair of the Consultative Council on Mental Handicap as well as becoming honorary treasurer of the National Association for the Mentally Handicapped of Ireland.

== Personal life ==
During the war, Eva married John 'Jack' Madden Philbin, and they had two daughters and a son. Jack died in 1997. Her eldest daughter Eimear became a physician, as did her younger daughter Deirdre. Eimear married broadcaster and historian John Bowman. Her son Liam's disability was the impetus for her work with the National Association for the Mentally Handicapped of Ireland, which continued through her entire life. Philbin died in 2005, aged 91.
