= Burgery ambush =

Ambush during the Irish War of Independence

- Part of Irish War of Independence
Date	18 March 1921
Location	The Burgery, near Dungarvan, County Waterford

Belligerents
Irish Republican Army (Déise Brigade)	(United Kingdom of Great Britain and Ireland) Royal Irish Constabulary (Reserve Force)

Commanders and leaders
George Oliver Plunkett	(United Kingdom of Great Britain and Ireland) Captain DV Thomas

Strength
~20	14 (initially); 50 (subsequently)

Casualties and losses
2 killed	2 killed 2 captured

The Burgery ambush was an ambush carried out by the Irish Republican Army (IRA) on 18–19 March 1921, during the Irish War of Independence. It took place near Dungarvan, County Waterford.

== Ambush ==
On the night of 18–19 March 1921, IRA volunteers of the West Waterford flying column ambushed a British military convoy at the Burgery, about a mile and a half northeast of Dungarvan. The convoy included Black and Tans and a Royal Irish Constabulary Sergeant, named Michael Hickey. In overall command of the IRA unit was IRA GHQ Officer George Plunkett. Also present were West Waterford Brigade Commandant Pax Whelan, ASU leader George Lennon, and Mick Mansfield. A British Crossley tender was set on fire and prisoners taken by the IRA, including Sergeant Hickey. Hickey was later killed by an IRA firing squad with a sign reading "police spy" affixed to his tunic. He was later buried in an unmarked grave. Other prisoners including Captain DV Thomas, the commander of the British garrison, were released.

After the ambush, a group of volunteers under Plunkett returned to search for any armaments left behind by the British forces. Crown forces who were now searching the area engaged the IRA party; IRA volunteers Seán Fitzgerald and Pat Keating were shot dead. A member of the Black and Tans, Constable Sydney R. Redman was shot dead during the return fire.

== Sources ==
- Rebel Heart: George Lennon: Flying Column Commander, Mercier 2009, ISBN 1-85635-649-3
