= Pickardstown ambush =

Failed IRA ambush against the RIC, 1921

The Pickardstown ambush, an action in the Irish War of Independence, took place near the town of Tramore, County Waterford on the night of 6 January 1921.

== The ambush ==
The ambush was conceived by Paddy Paul, the leader of the IRA East Waterford Brigade, who gathered Volunteers from the local Dunhill and Waterford City units of his command as well as the West Waterford flying column led by George Lennon. This made for a total of fifty men although several were armed only with shotguns.

An attack was made on the RIC barracks in Tramore which lured reinforcements from the British military garrison in Waterford City. Four Crossley tenders were quickly dispatched with forty troops on board. However, the ambush had been badly planned with the result that the British troops were able to make a determined counterattack, ultimately killing two IRA men - Michael McGrath (the first Waterford City Volunteer killed in the Irish War of Independence) and Thomas O'Brien and wounding two more. One British soldier and one Black and Tan were wounded.

For further information about the Pickardstown Ambush visit: https://www.pickardstown-ambush.ie

== Commemoration ==
A memorial was later erected on the ambush site.

In later years, local GAA fields were named after the two dead IRA men.
