= Thomas Dillon (chemist) =

Irish chemist & nationalist (1884–1971)

Thomas Patrick Dillon
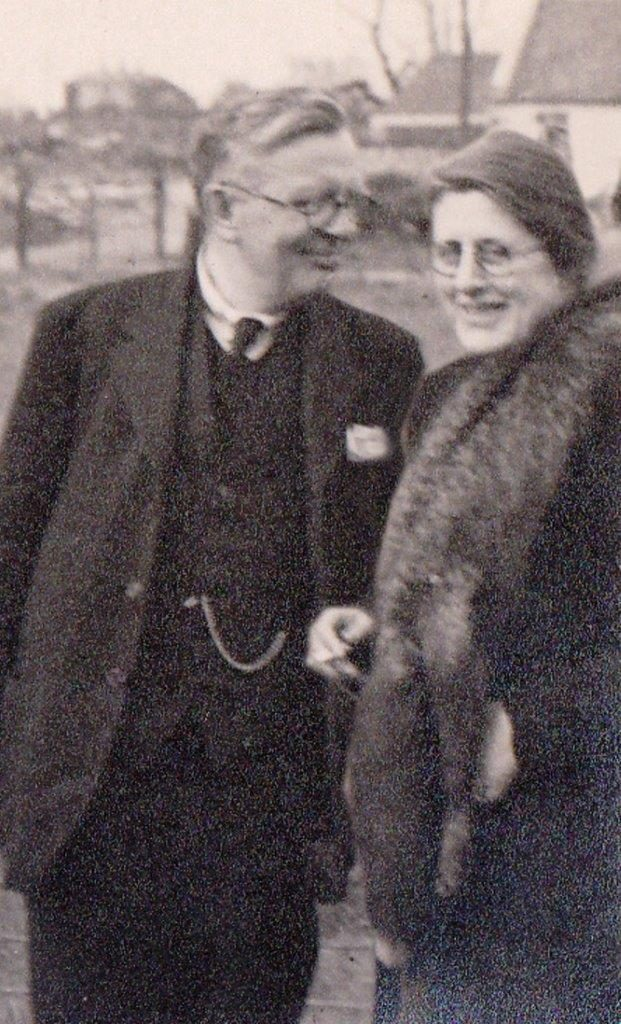
- Dillon with his wife in 1940
- Born: 15 January 1884; Enniscrone, County Sligo, Ireland
- Died: 11 December 1971 (aged 87)
- Education: Queen's College, Cork; Royal College of Science, Dublin

Thomas Dillon (15 January 1884 – 11 December 1971) was an Irish chemist and nationalist.

== Early life and education ==
Thomas Patrick Dillon was born in Enniscrone, County Sligo on 15 January 1884. His parents were Elizabeth (née Sullivan) and John Dillon, an engineer. His maternal grandfather was William Kirby Sullivan, and his paternal great uncle was John Blake Dillon. He was the eldest of five children, with 4 younger sisters. When his father was tasked with building the waterworks of Ballina, County Mayo, the family moved to the town. Dillon attended St Nathy's, Ballaghadereen, and later Clongowes Wood College. He won a scholarship to study medicine at Queen's College, Cork when he was 16. Having initially undertaken the mandatory preliminary course in arts, Dillon decided to study chemistry and physics, receiving his BA in 1904. He then entered the Royal College of Science, Dublin, being awarded an MA in chemistry in 1908.

Dillon was appointed assistant to professor of chemistry, Hugh Ryan, at the Catholic University school of medicine on a salary of £6 a month. He supplemented this by teaching science at the Catholic University School and Loreto Convent School, Dalkey. After the establishment of the National University of Ireland (NUI) in 1908, he transferred to University College Dublin (UCD) with Ryan. Dillon was awarded the first D.Sc. conferred by the NUI in 1912.

== Nationalism ==
Influenced by Joseph Plunkett and Tom Kettle, Dillon became involved in labour and republican politics. During the 1913 Lockout, he was the honorary secretary of the Industrial Peace Committee, and was the chemical adviser to the Irish Volunteers in their manufacture of bombs and hand grenades. His future wife, Geraldine Plunkett was one of his students in UCD, and sister of Joseph Plunkett. A fellow republican, they married in Rathmines on 23 April 1916, Easter Sunday in a ceremony which was also supposed to see Joseph marry Grace Gifford. The couple spent Easter Monday in the wedding suite of the Imperial Hotel, O'Connell Street watching the events of the Easter Rising unfold at the GPO. Dillon was awaiting orders to aid in the commandeering of chemical supplies for the manufacture of more explosives, but when this didn't happen he was ordered to return home to await further orders. As Dillon was not directly involved in the uprising, he was not arrested in the aftermath. He helped his father-in-law, George Noble Plunkett, convene a meeting of nationalist delegates from across Ireland in Dublin. At the Sinn Féin convention in October 1917 he refused the position of secretary, and instead agreed to sit on the executive council. Because of this, he was arrested in May 1918, and interned for almost a year in England in Gloucester prison. While there, he learnt Irish.

While still in Gloucester, Dillon applied for the post of professor of chemistry in University College Galway (UCG). After his release, he was appointed to the position in March 1919, after considerable opposition due to his IRB and Sinn Féin activities. Both Dillon and his wife were active during the War of Independence, with Dillon serving as a judge in Sinn Féin courts in 1920, and leading a raid on a courthouse in February 1921. Dillon was often evading the authorities, so rarely stayed at home, and his wife was imprisoned for a time in Galway Jail.

== Career ==
After the Irish Civil War, Dillon was able to focus on his academic career, and became an internationally respected expert in the structures of carbohydrates, specifically those in seaweeds. He was a pioneer in the research on alginic acid, carrageen, laminarin and other alginates and gums, which he published from 1928 in journals including the Scientific Proceedings of the Royal Dublin Society, Journal of the Chemical Society, Chemistry and Industry, and the Proceedings of the Royal Irish Academy. He took 2 patents in 1939 for techniques of paper and fertiliser manufacture using seaweed. During his time in UCG, the chemistry department focused heavily on the analysis and synthesis of carbohydrates.

Dillon was not a native Irish speaker, but he encouraged the teaching of chemistry through Irish, with parts of the degree programmes being delivered through Irish in the early 1940s by Vincent Barry and Prionsias Ó Colla. Dillon co-authored the first chemistry textbook in Irish with Barry. Under his leadership, the UCG chemistry department grew from 70 students in 1919 to 100 by 1953. He was a founding member of the Chemical Association of Ireland and the Irish Chemical Association. From 1954 to 1956 he was the president of the Institute of Chemistry of Ireland. He was elected a member of the Royal Irish Academy in 1941, serving as vice-president in 1957. He was awarded an honorary doctorate from the University of Dublin in 1954.

== Later life and family ==
He retired from UCG in 1954. He and his wife lived apart for a period, before they both moved to Dublin to live with their daughter. He had had five children, Moya, Blanaid, Eilís, Michael, and Eoin. One son died at age three. Dillon died on 11 December 1971.
