= Kinsalebeg =

Civil parish in County Waterford, Ireland

Coordinates: 51.9694°N 7.8093°W

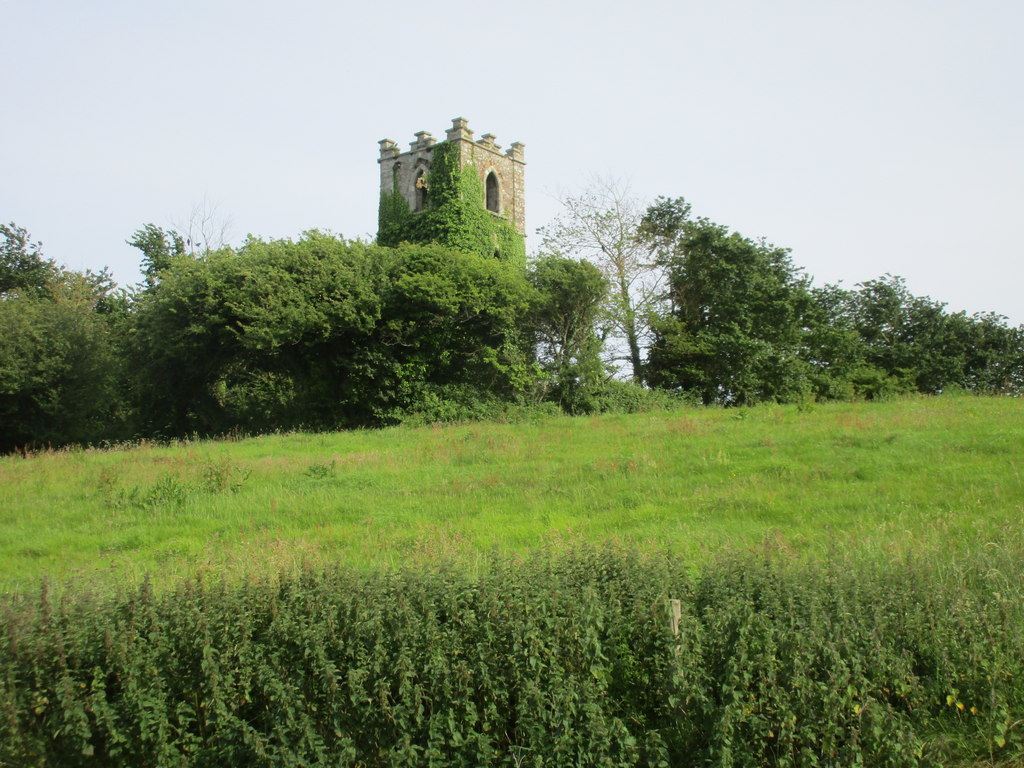
The Church of Ireland church at Kinsalebeg, now in ruin, was built in 1821

Kinsalebeg (Irish: Cionn tSáile) is a civil parish in the historical barony of Decies-within-Drum in County Waterford, Ireland. Kinsalebeg is close to the border with County Cork and across the bay, at Youghal Harbour, from the town of Youghal.

The former Church of Ireland church in Kinsalebeg, built in 1821, has been disused since the early 20th century and is now in ruin. The current Roman Catholic church, in Pilltown townland, was built in the late 20th century on the site of an earlier church. This church, which is dedicated to Saint Bartholomew, is in the Roman Catholic Diocese of Waterford and Lismore. A holy well, also associated with Saint Bartholomew, is nearby.

The local national (primary) school, Kinsalebeg National School (also known as Scoil Náisiúnta Naomh Parthala), had an enrolment of 59 pupils as of January 2024.

== See also ==
- Piltown Cross ambush (1920)
