= Piltown Cross ambush =

1920 IRA ambush

The Piltown Cross ambush was an action of the Irish Republican Army (IRA) during the Irish War of Independence. The attack on British forces took place on the night of 1 November 1920 near the village of Kinsalebeg, County Waterford. The site of the attack at the crossroads known as Piltown Cross was carefully chosen to give the attackers maximum tactical advantage.

Involved was the IRA West Waterford Brigade, specifically the newly formed Deise Flying Column under Officer Commanding (O/C) George Lennon of Dungarvan, as well as Volunteers from the local Ardmore battalion. Returned Great War veteran John Riordan planned the successful engagement involving a feint attack on the RIC barracks in Ardmore. The British garrison in Youghal subsequently dispatched nearly twenty troops from the 2nd Hampshires under Lieutenant Griffin in a single lorry. They were ambushed at Kinsalebeg on the main Dungarvan – Youghal road and suffered one dead and six wounded. Because the British had no means of transport, O/C Lennon got a horse and cart for their use in transporting the dead and wounded back to Youghal. The ambush resulted in the capture of 18 Lee-Enfield rifles, two police carbines and a large quantity of ammunition/grenades which were used to equip the flying column. Captured were R.I.C. constables O'Neill and Prendiville who gave their word that they would resign. O'Neill returned to his base in Youghal and resigned on the spot. Prendiville was subsequently killed from a shot from the Waterford side of the Youghal Bridge.

In 2008 a commemorative memorial was erected to the Piltown ambushes. "Here at Piltown Cross on the night of 1 November 1920, Volunteers of the West Waterford I.R.A. Brigade took on the might of the British Crown Forces fatally wounded 2 of them, captured and injured many more".

The IRA captured a substantial amount of much needed arms/ammunition and destroyed enemy vehicles, in what was one of the biggest ambushes of that era in this area.

The ambush is commemorated in a memorial erected at the site of the ambush:

This monument is erected in memory of those Volunteers who fought here and assisted in the West Waterford area on that night, and to all of those brave Irish men and women who fought in every generation up to the present day in the struggle for Irish freedom.

== Sources ==
- Gunfire and Civil War Sean and Sile Murphy Clonmel 2005
- Rebel Heart: George Lennon: Flying Column Commander Mercier 2009, ISBN 1-85635-649-3
- "The Struggle For Freedom In West Waterford" at Waterford County Museum
