= George Oliver Plunkett =

Irish republican (1894–1944)

- Irish: Seoirse Oilibhéar Pluincéid
- Plunkett, circa 1940s

Personal details
- Born: 5 July 1894 Dublin, County Dublin, Ireland
- Died: 21 January 1944 (aged 49) Dundalk, County Louth, Ireland
- Party: Sinn Féin
- Parent: George Noble Plunkett (father)
- Relatives: Joseph Plunkett (Brother), Fiona Plunkett (Sister)
- Education: Belvedere College, Stonyhurst College
- Alma mater: University College Dublin

Military service
- Branch/service: Irish Volunteers; Irish Republican Army; Anti-Treaty IRA
- Rank: Commandant
- Battles/wars: Easter Rising; Irish War of Independence; Irish Civil War

George Oliver Plunkett (Irish: Seoirse Oilibhéar Pluincéid; 5 July 1894 – 21 January 1944), known to his contemporaries as Seoirse Plunkett, was a militant Irish republican. He was sentenced to death with his elder brother Joseph and his younger brother John after the 1916 Easter Rising, but while Joseph was executed, George's and John's sentences were later commuted. He was released in 1917, fought in the Irish War of Independence and Irish Civil War for the Anti-Treaty IRA, and was briefly IRA Chief of Staff during World War II.

== Early life ==
Seoirse was born in 1894, in Dublin, where his parents lived at the time, the son of George Noble Plunkett, a papal count and curator of the National Museum and his wife, Josephine, née Cranny; the Plunkett and Cranny families were both housing developers.

George was named after his father and his collateral ancestor Oliver Plunkett, Archbishop of Armagh, who was martyred in 1681. He was one of seven children; his siblings were Philomena (Mimi, 1886), Joseph (1887), Moya (Maria, 1889), Geraldine (Gerry, 1891), Fiona (1896) and John (Jack, 1897). Like Joseph he was sent to England to be educated at the exclusive Catholic public school Stonyhurst College, where he acquired his upper-class English accent.

== Easter Rising ==
George Plunkett used a tram to get his men into Dublin for the Easter Rising.

George joined the Irish Volunteers in 1914 and in the Easter Rising of 1916 was a Captain in command of the "Kimmage Garrison". These men on the run (including Michael Collins) had been staying at George's mother's Larkfield estate in Kimmage, then a country area just southwest of Dublin city making bombs for the Rising. Famously on Easter Monday he waved down a tram with his revolver at Harold's Cross, near Kimmage, boarded it with his men (armed with shotguns, pikes and homemade bombs), took out his wallet and said, "Fifty-two tuppenny tickets to the city centre please". Arriving at Liberty Hall in style they were organised into four companies under George's command, almost as large as some of the IRA battalions. With a hundred other Volunteers they marched with James Connolly and Patrick Pearse to seize the General Post Office (GPO).

When Connolly gave the order to attack George shouted "Take the GPO" and charged in. The GPO was the headquarters of the Irish Volunteers and Irish Citizen Army during the week-long Rising.

George fought in the offices of the Irish Times on Abbey Street. He ordered his men to move the huge rolls of printing paper to barricade O'Connell Street, which aided the spread of fire that burned down the GPO. At one point he risked being shot when he went to comfort a wounded British soldier, the enemy holding fire once they saw he was on a mission of mercy.

He surrendered with his brothers Joe and Jack (17) and the rest of the headquarters garrison on Saturday 29 April 1916. He was court-martialled with his brother Jack Plunkett on 4 May 1916 and both were sentenced to death by shooting, which was commuted to ten years' penal servitude by Lt-Gen Sir John Maxwell, who had ordered their brother Joseph's execution, George witnessing Joseph's will a few hours before his death. His father and mother were also arrested and imprisoned. His sister Geraldine later wrote;

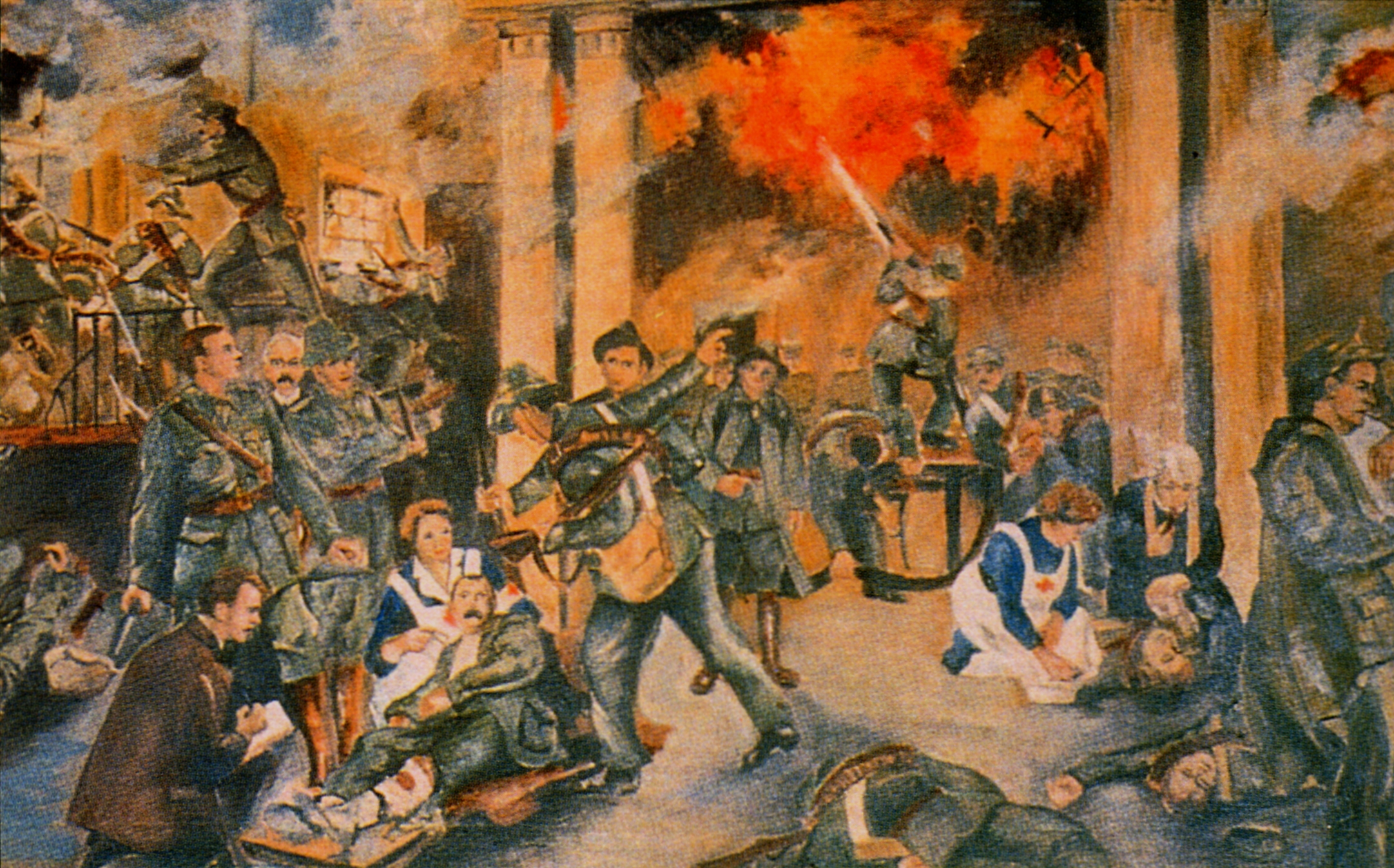
George Plunkett fought at the GPO during the Easter Rising.

"When the newspapers came out on Saturday the 6th (May 1916) we saw that George and Jack had also been sentenced to death and the sentence commuted to ten years. Jack told me afterwards that he had been told first of the death sentence and that the officer had then paused for a whole minute before telling him it had been commuted. Jack and George were brought to Mountjoy Jail for a few days, and then brought in a cattle boat to Holyhead. They spent six months in Portland Prison before being moved to Parkhurst, on the Isle of Wight. I got some South African medal ribbon because it was green, white and orange and made it into a bow which I wore everywhere. A big policeman in Dame Street stopped me and said the tricolour would get me into trouble. I said, 'I have one brother shot and two brothers sentenced to death and my father and mother in jail. He said 'You're Plunkett, you can wear it'."

== Irish War of Independence ==
George was released in the 1917 amnesty and returned to Ireland and became a commandant in the newly formed IRA. On 20 October 1917 he addressed a huge Sinn Féin meeting in Dungarvan Square with his father and a Volunteer cavalry section as a guard of honour. As a member of IRA GHQ George travelled the county putting volunteer companies on a war footing.

The Irish War of Independence broke out when Éamon de Valera re-declared Irish Independence in 1919. On the night of 18–19 March 1921 George commanded the IRA volunteers of the West Waterford Déise Brigade (Pax Whelan, Officer Commanding and George Lennon O/C Flying Column) and caught a British military convoy in the Burgery ambush two miles northeast of Dungarvan. The convoy included Black and Tans and Royal Irish Constabulary and after a firefight they were forced to retreat. An old flute-player arrived on the scene, refused to leave and followed the IRA to Kilgobinet, George said "Well, one thing he can say is that he saw the English running from the Irish". After the ambush George led a group of IRA volunteers to search for any armaments left behind by the British forces, and were engaged by the British. Pat Keating of Comeragh was fatally wounded and George went out under fire to help him, as he had done in the Easter Rising, and the IRA retreated to the Comeragh Mountains.

== Irish Civil War and after ==
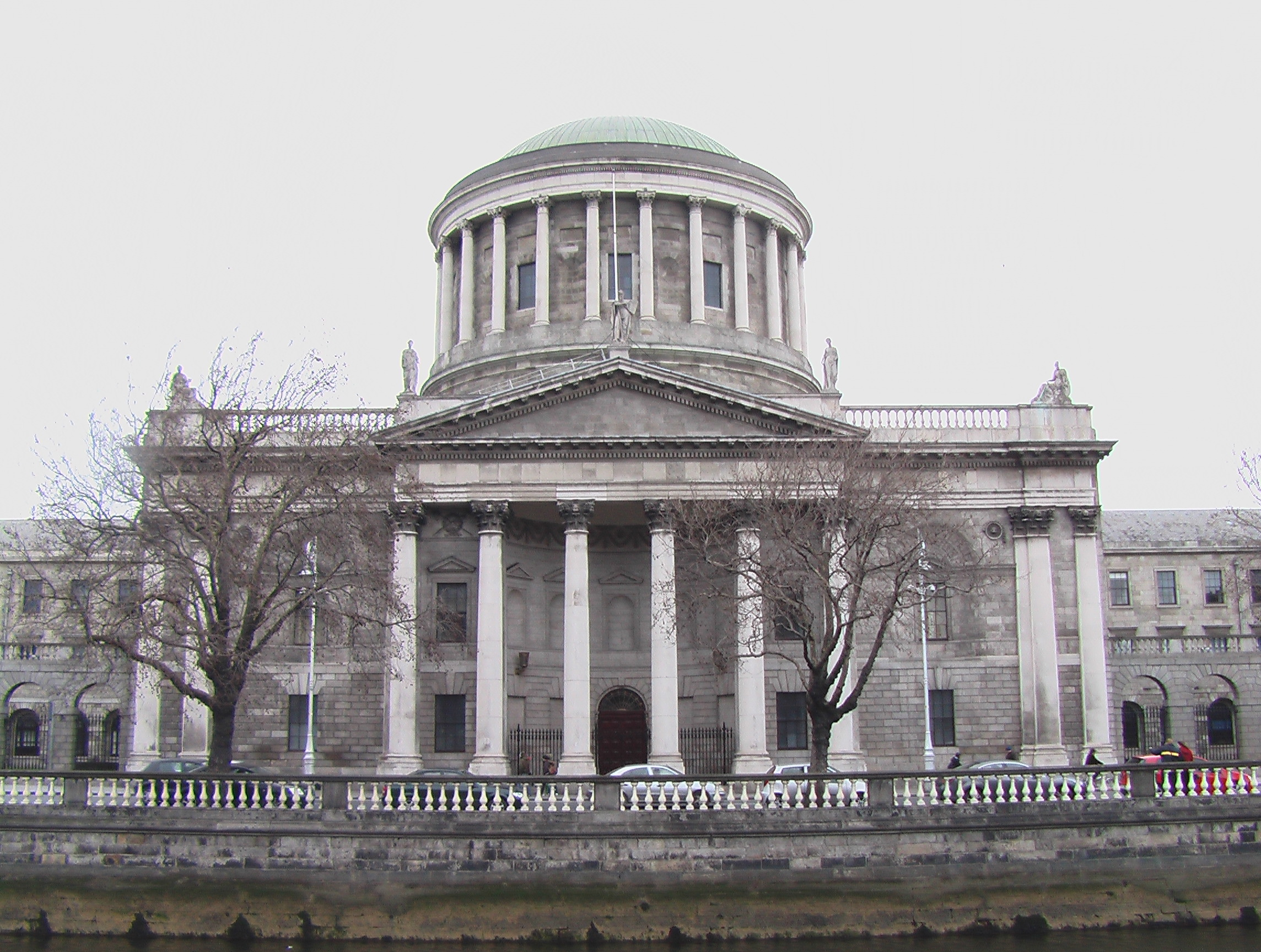
George Plunkett was part of the Anti-Treaty IRA that seized the Four Courts in the Irish Civil War and were bombarded on the orders of Arthur Griffith and Michael Collins.

George sided with the anti-treaty IRA against the Irish Free State in the Irish Civil War and both he and his brother Jack fought at the Four Courts when the war began, where they worked in the Records Office making mines and bombs. When the Executive Council of the IRA realised that the British had given their enemies artillery to bombard the Four Courts Rory O'Connor and Ernie O'Malley were concerned about the effect it would have on the men; George said, "You get used to it… it's not bad". After three days of shelling George voted against surrender and O'Malley called him "a rock of gentle determination". The Four Courts were surrendered and the Record Office which he had used as an arms dump blew up with two tons of gelitine and 700 years of legal documents.

The brothers were captured and imprisoned again in Kilmainham Gaol where they and others went on hunger strike until George looked "like a death's head". He was transferred to Mountjoy Prison and later in 1922 Judge Crowley ordered his release as his arrest was illegal under habeas corpus.

In 1929 the rift between the IRA and Sinn Féin was bridged for a period with the formation of Comhairle na Poblachta (the Council for the Republic). In one body "were included Maud Gonne MacBride, solid IRA men like George Plunkett and Seán MacBride, Mary MacSwiney, JJ O'Kelly and the de jure Republicans; the Republican Left like Frank Ryan and Mick Fitzpatrick, firm Sinn Féin people like Joe Clarke…", but they soon split again.

Tom Barry advocated using Nazi Germany as a source of arms and funds in the late 1930s; this was rejected by Plunkett and the Army Council. On 12 January 1939 he was one of the seven signatories of the IRA's declaration of war on the United Kingdom to liberate Northern Ireland. This led to the S-Plan sabotage bombing campaign of England in 1939-40 and his being interned in the Curragh. George Plunkett was briefly IRA Chief of Staff during World War II.

George Plunkett died in Dundalk on 21 January 1944 from a fractured skull, sustained in falling from a horse-drawn trap in Ballymascanlon, where he was living with his family.
