= Provisional Government of the Irish Republic =

Rebel Government in Ireland during the Easter rising

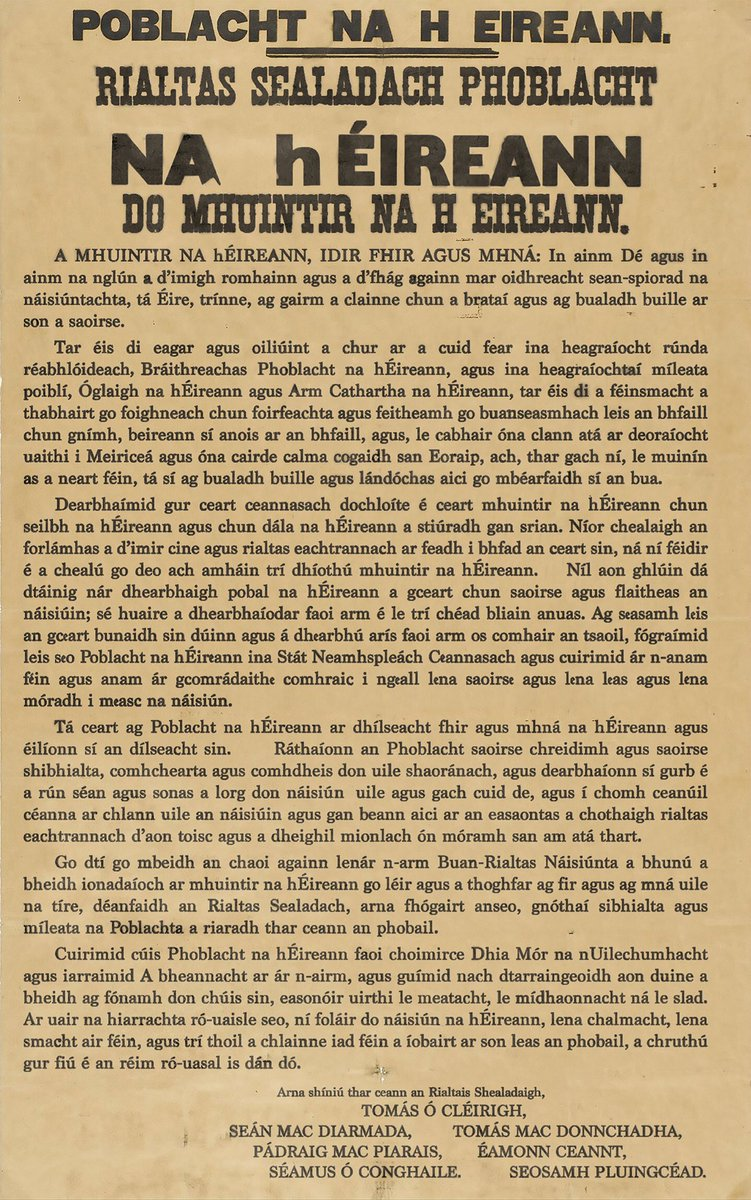
Irish language translation of the 1916 Proclamation of the Irish Republic

During the Easter Rising in Dublin on 24 April 1916, the Proclamation of the Irish Republic read by Padraig Pearse was headed and signed as being issued by the 'Provisional Government of the Irish Republic'. The Rising lasted five days and despite controlling only a few strategic sites, transformed the political picture in Ireland and began a chain of events that led to Independence for the Irish six years later.

It is probable that all the leaders of the Rising expected to be defeated, and in a very short time. The object of their action was to strike the first blow in the struggle for freedom, rather than actually to establish a republic, with institutions, policies and government. The establishment of a Provisional government, therefore, was symbolic rather than practical. In contrast with the Dáil government of 1919–1922, which had a cabinet, a police force and a courts system, or the Provisional Government of the Irish Free State, the Provisional Government of April 1916 does not appear ever to have operated as such.

== Members of the Provisional Government ==
The Proclamation was signed "on Behalf of the Provisional Government" by seven men, whose names were printed as follows:

THOMAS J. CLARKE
| SEAN Mac DIARMADA | THOMAS MacDONAGH |
| P.H.PEARSE | EAMONN CEANNT |
| JAMES CONNOLLY | JOSEPH PLUNKETT |

Since no manuscript of the Proclamation exists, there are no holograph signatures. The seven signed “on behalf of” the Provisional Government, but it is generally accepted that they were themselves the government. However, there is no evidence that there were any designated responsibilities for any of the seven. It is not obvious in what order they signed. The signatures are commonly read from left to right and top to bottom, but they could just as easily be read from top to bottom on the left and then on the right. This would put Pearse in third place, after Clarke and Mac Diarmada, the original organisers of the Rising. Connolly, as leader of the Irish Citizen Army, would come after him. These four (plus Plunkett) were in the GPO Headquarters during the Rising, and military orders were issued by all four. Even the identity of the head of government is not altogether clear-cut. In all probability, such distinctions were unimportant to the leaders of the Rising, and in the lead-up to Easter 1916, and during Easter Week itself, all their energies were devoted to the military campaign. With their deaths in the first two weeks of May 1916 the first government of the Irish Republic came to an end.

Pearse is generally believed to have been the leader of the rebels, and therefore assumed to have been the Head of Government and President of the Republic, and is described as the "first President of the Irish Republic" by historian Tim Pat Coogan. However Kathleen Clarke, the widow of Tom Clarke, maintained that, by inviting Clarke to sign first, the other signatories acknowledged him as first President of the Republic, and said that Clarke confirmed that interpretation to her. On the 50th anniversary ceremonies in 1966, Mrs Clarke said in an interview that Pearse had "wanted to grab what was due to others . . . surely Pearse should have been satisfied with the honour of Commander-in-Chief when he knew as much about commanding as my dog … I had not intended raising the issue in public but I shall be forced to come out very strongly in public if the powers that be attempt to declare Pearse as President". Clarke's son, however, accepted that Pearse and not his father had been President of the Irish Republic.
