= Charlie Daly =

Irish republican (1896–1923)

Charlie Daly (10 August 1896 – 14 March 1923), born in Castlemaine, County Kerry, was the second son of Con. W. Daly, of Knockaneacoolteen, Firies, County Kerry. He went to school, first to Ballyfinnane National School, and later to the Christian Brothers at Tralee.

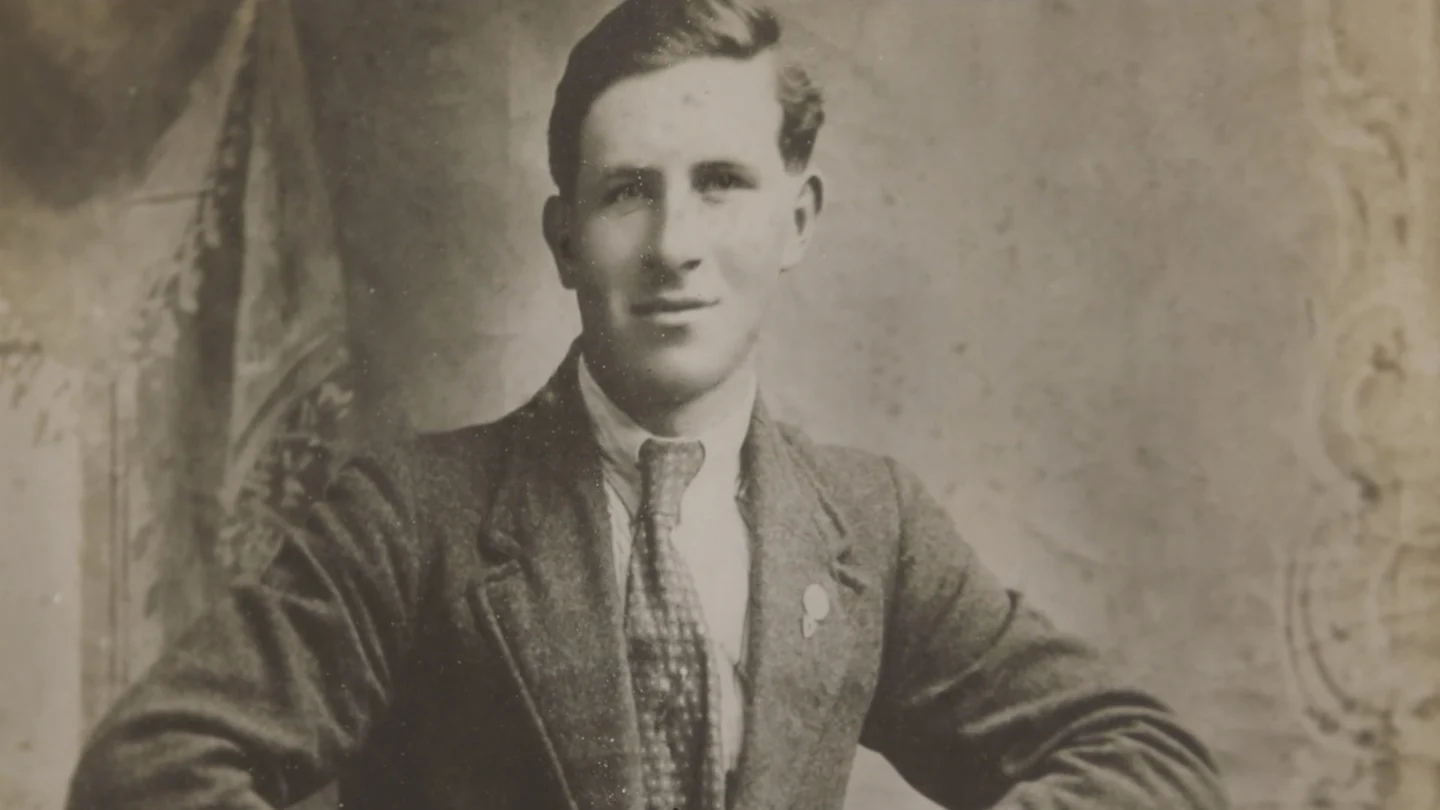
Charlie Daly

Daly had been an active member of the Irish Volunteers from 1913 (before the Easter Rising). Under the Defence of the Realm Act 1914 he was incarcerated at Cork Male Prison 1918–1919 for unlawful assembly; specifically for "throwing stones at the police". In his wound pension application of 1937 IRA leader George Lennon noted Daly as the Officer Commanding (O/C) the prisons No. 10 Wing. A "smash up strike" in the jail resulted in solitary confinement and ill treatment for the men. Charlie Daly rose to the rank of Commandant General in the Irish Republican Army (IRA). Daly was the O/C the IRA's Second Northern Division during the critical time period before the Partition of Ireland.

Accompanied by IRA leaders Liam Lynch and George Lennon he was at the Mansion House on 7 January 1922 when a slim majority of seven voted to accept the Treaty. Daly subsequently took the anti-treaty side in the Irish Civil War and was executed (in retaliation) on orders from the newly formed Irish Free State government.

== O/C 2nd Northern Division & Civil War ==
In early 1920 IRA General Headquarters sent Daly to County Tyrone naming him as the O/C the IRAs 2nd Northern Division which covered all of Tyrone and parts of County Londonderry. Daly was to organize the few units there and was ordered to 'raid for arms' indicating how poorly armed the Tyrone IRA was at that time. Prior to Dalys arrival in Tyrone "...each IRA company was more or less acting independently on its own." Local IRA leadership welcomed Daly, he "impressed us very much with his example and bearing" while working to develop an offensive spirt within the Tyrone IRA. The 24 year old Daly stressed to the local IRA members that a number of people would have to be prepared to make the supreme sacrifice and that "volunteering was not going to be an easy job". Just prior to Christmas 1920 Daly was in Dublin and was arrested in a sweep. He was held in North Dublin Union Barracks under an alias and was released after just a few days.

In the spring of 1921 Monaghan IRA leader Eoin O'Duffy replaced Daly as the Commandant of the IRA's 2nd Northern Division (Tyrone). Liam Kelly, a well respected Tyrone Republican felt the Daly should have gotten the appointment: "I am convinced that O'Duffys appointment was a mistake as Charlie Daly was a better man for the job. He knew the area much better and worked with the men for about twelve months beforehand. He knew all the officers in the area intimately and was a general favourite with all who had contact with him." During this time Daly was a senior leader of the IRA in County Donegal. Following the truce with the British, O'Duffy was reassigned to Belfast, and Daly again assumed command of the 2nd Northern Division of the IRA.

=== Tyrone actions ===
In 1921 Daly commanded 15 active companies in Tyrone, each composed of about 50 men. During this time 27 members of the Crown Forces were killed by the local IRA. Daly's forces carried out numerous attacks on police barracks and raids of private residences for arms/ammunition. The Tyrone based newspaper the Ulster Herald claimed that on 24 September 1920 Dalys forces, consisting of 200 men and 50 vehicles, took part in raids for arms in the area of Gortin, County Tyrone. Another Tyrone newspaper the Tyrone Courier called the raids "...the largest and most extensive raid for arms which has yet taken place in Ireland." On the day of the truce (11 July 1921) Daly led an arson attack on a creamery near Cookstown, County Tyrone. This attack was in retaliation for the numerous burnings of creameries in the south of Ireland by the Black and Tans. On November 23, 1921 Daly led an attack by the Carrickmore Battalion on the RIC at Ballygawley, which resulted in the wounding of three police and two civilian drivers. Just after the signing of the Anglo-Irish Treaty of December 1921, Daly recognized the different enemies his forces now faced: "it seems curious that we must risk our lives for the sake of a cause that has been handed over to the enemy. Of course the Northerners must fight for their existence under whatever government is in power."

In February 1922 Daly was removed from his position as O/C 2nd Northern Division and replaced with a pro treaty officer (Tom Morris). Daly stated that his removal was the result of his opposition to the Treaty and was just one of several moves made by the newly appointed Free State Minister of Defense Richard Mulcahy to replace anti treaty northern IRA leaders. Later in the year Daly publicly challenged Morris who he said "...made up his mind not to fight for, or protect, his own or your people in the "Six Counties". He means to fight against the republic."

Daly continued to fight – he planned the highly successful attack on the Royal Irish Constabulary (RIC) barrack in Pomeroy, County Tyrone (19 March 1922). Approximately 20 heavily armed Tyrone IRA men gained entrance to the base and made off with 75 rifles and a large quantity of ammunition. In the spring of 1922 Daly was involved in the planning and execution of the IRAs Northern Offensive and initially worked to avoid violence between pro and anti treaty forces who were divided over the terms of the Anglo-Irish Treaty. Speaking about the IRAs campaign in Tyrone while he was in command, Daly stated that: "Taking into consideration the hostile civilian population with superior equipment backed by Regular Forces, and the apathy of our own civilian population, this area did far more than several Southern Counties situated under far more favourable circumstances."

At the beginning of the Irish Civil War Daly was committed to what he believed was a common policy between pro and anti treaty forces to resist a newly formed Northern Ireland state. Some northern IRA units had moved into Donegal to avoid being captured but Dalys forces were hopelessly outnumbered and under increased pressure from pro treaty forces. Facing overwhelming opposition, Daly and the O/C the IRAs 1st Northern Division, Sean Lehane split their forces into smaller columns. In a letter dated 17 September 1922, Daly expressed his forces desperate situation: "Here we are with one small column trying to hold our own against desperate odds. A month ago I never expected that one of us would be left by now."

== Arrest, execution and legacy ==
On 2 November 1922, Charlie Daly was captured and imprisoned at Drumboe Castle, County Donegal, where he was held until 16 January 1923, when he was court-martialled and sentenced to death. On 14 March 1923, Commandant General Daly (aged 26), Lt. Daniel Enright (aged 23), Brigadier Commandant Sean Larkin (aged 26), and Lt. Timothy O'Sullivan (aged 23) were given an opportunity to prevent their execution if they each signed the following "Declaration": "I promise that I will not use arms against the Parliament elected by the Irish people, or the Government for the time being responsible to that Parliament, and that I will not support in any way such action. Nor will I interfere with the property or person of others." All four men refused to sign and faced a Free State Army firing squad shortly thereafter, they were part of the 81 official executions. The four men became known as the "Drumboe Martyrs". Like Daly, Enright and O'Sullivan were also from Kerry.

Daly (and the three IRA Officers) were executed in retaliation for an act they did not commit – the shooting of Captain Bernard Cannon a pro-treaty National Army officer. Joseph Sweeney was the Commander of the Provisional Government forces in County Donegal and knew Daly from earlier years. Sweeney was quoted on the execution of Daly: "The terrible thing was that Daly had to be executed...Daly and I had been very friendly when we were students, and it is an awful thing to kill a man you know in cold blood, if you're on level terms with him...I didn't agree with it, but they were orders and you had to do it."

His sister May Daly was a significant figure in Sinn Féin in Kerry up to the 1970s; she stood in the 1957 general election in Kerry North, polling 3,171 votes.

One of his descendants, Mark Daly, was elected senator in 2007 for Fianna Fáil. Another one of his descendants, Lorraine Clifford-Lee, was elected as a Fianna Fáil senator in 2016. While another one of his descendants, Pa Daly was elected as a Sinn Féin TD in 2020.
