= Waterford County Museum =

- Músaem Contae Phort Láirge
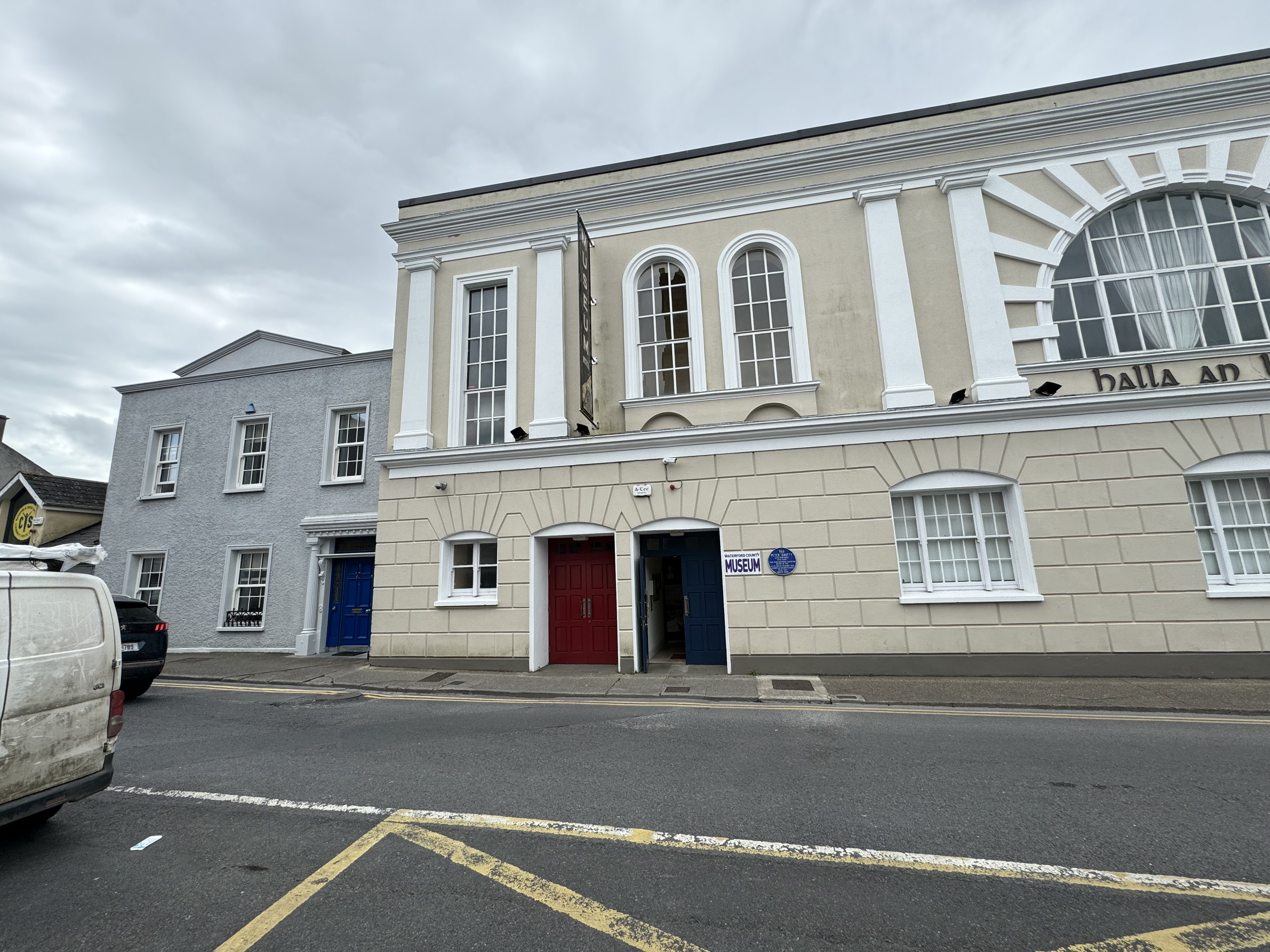
- The museum in 2024

- Location within Ireland
- Established: 1982
- Location: Dungarvan, County Waterford, Ireland
- Coordinates: 52.0887°N 7.6194°W
- Type: County museum
- Curator: William Fraher
- Public transit access: Davitts Quay bus stop (Bus Éireann route 40)
- Website: www.waterfordmuseum.ie

Waterford County Museum (Irish: Músaem Contae Phort Láirge) is a museum documenting the history of County Waterford. The museum is located in the Old Town Hall, Dungarvan.

== History ==
The museum is run by the Waterford County Museum Society, which was founded explicitly to run the museum following a meeting convened in 1982 by the Dungarvan Irish Countrywomen's Association. It was first housed in Market House, but moved to the Old Town Hall in 1999. The Hall had originally been built as a grain store by a local merchant, Thomas Buckley, in the late 1700s. By the middle of the 1880s the buildings had fallen into disrepair, and were converted into a Town Hall and public library. The current façade of the building dates from 1909.

== Contents ==
The museum and its collections aim to document, collect and preserve the history of Dungarvan and west County Waterford. The museum is split into two areas, one for the permanent collections, and one for temporary exhibitions. The collections include trophies, Cap Badges of the Irish Regiments (1914–1918), artefacts related to military history, and a coin collection. The exhibitions cover topics relating to local history such as the Famine, sport, the local Big Houses, the War of Independence and the Civil War, maritime history, as well as World War I and II.

In 2006, the museum received the Best Small Museum Web Site at the museums and the Web international conference for its digital archive of over 2500 images relating to local history. There was an extensive refurbishment of the museum, reopening in 2009 with extended exhibition space.
