= Power O'Malley =

Irish artist

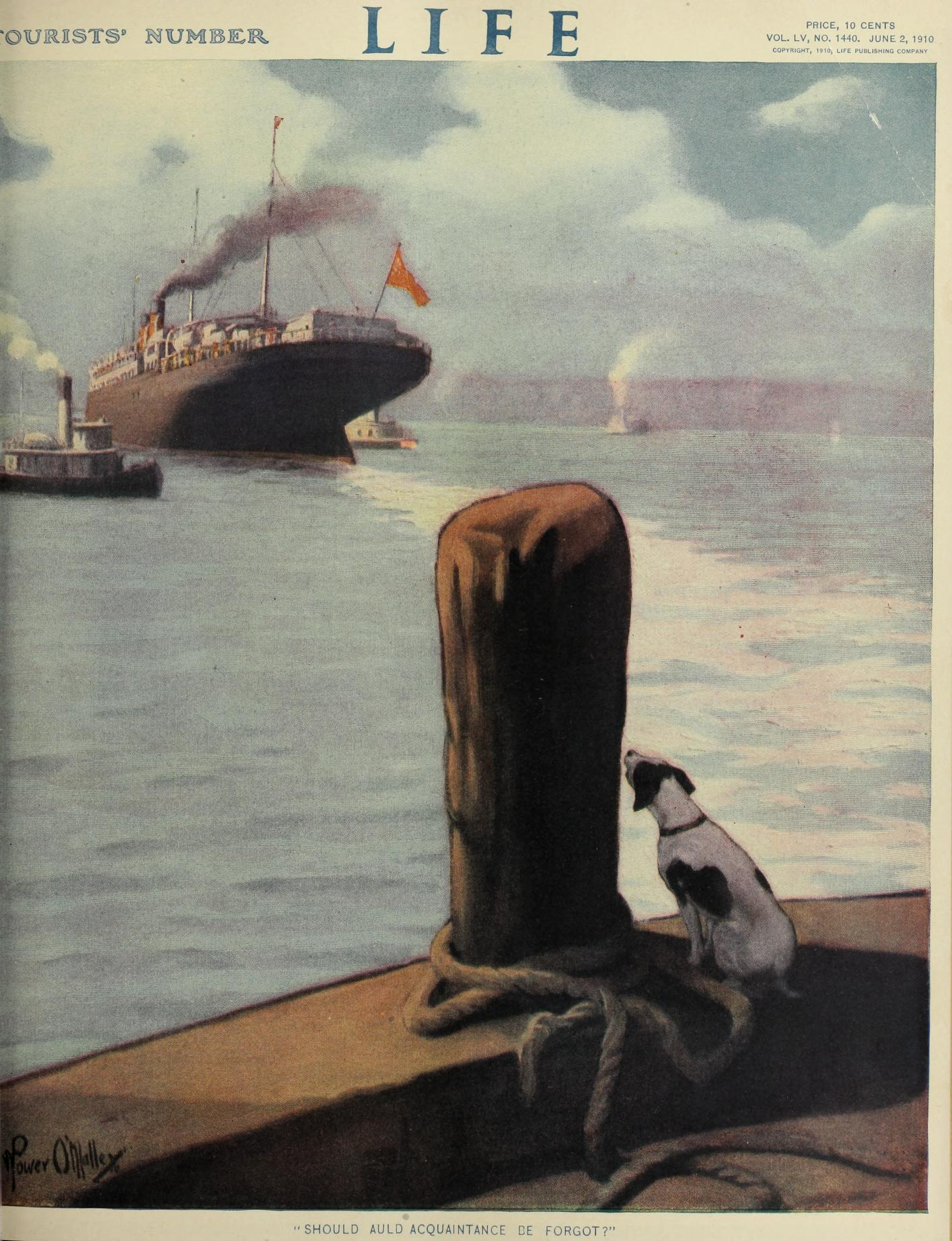
1910 cover of Life magazine.

Michael Augustine Power (19 January 1877 – 1946), better known as Power O'Malley, was an Irish artist during the 19th and 20th centuries.

== Early life and education ==
He was born in Dungarvan, County Waterford, Ireland on 19 January 1877 to Michael Power and Bridget Hannigan. Upon the death of his father, his mother married Dennis O'Malley and the family moved to Dublin, where he studied at the Dublin Metropolitan School of Art. He took the name O'Malley in honour of his much loved stepfather.

== Career ==
=== Book illustrations and magazine covers ===
Emigrating to New York at the turn of the 20th century, O'Malley did book illustrations and covers for Life, The Literary Digest, Harper's, and Puck. He traveled to the west coast where he advised John Ford on film settings and reportedly painted sets for Cecil B DeMille's epic The King of Kings. In 1904 he married Ruth Yeaton Stuart, the daughter of an Alexandria, Virginia judge. The couple moved to France, where he continued his work and study in art. After twenty-three years, the marriage ended in divorce.

The couple had two children, Theo, who died in infancy, and is buried in Bailey's Bay, Bermuda, and Ruth Power-O'Malley, born in 1906 in Bailey's Bay, Bermuda. Ruth Power-O'Malley was a well-known writer of short stories and screenplays during the 1940s. Her novel Mrs Cassatt's Children was published by Houghton Mifflin in 1943. It is based on the story of her Virginia family, who settled in Jamestown, Virginia in 1607. Ruth Power-O'Malley is buried near her brother in the Outerbridge family grave in Bailey's Bay.

=== Painting trips ===
Power O'Malley made regular painting trips home to Ireland, most notably to Achill Island in County Mayo. His first exhibition was held in 1913 at the Gaelic League Hall on Rutland Square (now Parnell Square), Dublin. One of his paintings, the dreamy portrait The Fisherman's Daughter (Munster), was the frontispiece for the December 1912 issue of The Irish Review, then edited by Padraic Colum and Mary Colum. Exhibition locales included New York City, Fort Worth, Los Angeles, San Antonio, London (Beaux Arts Gallery) and the Crawford in Cork (1940). In 1924, he won first prize at the Aonach Tailteann exhibition in Dublin for his painting The Old Quarry.

He was listed as a member of the advisory board of editors of a later version of The Irish Review published in 1934, which included George Lennon (1900–1991) of Dungarvan, former commanding officer of the West Waterford IRA Flying Column (1919–1921) as business manager. At this time, either in Taos, New Mexico or New York City, he most likely met republican guerrilla leader and author (On Another Man's Wound, The Singing Flame) Ernie O'Malley. The late 1930s also found him in Bermuda.

He died in New York City in 1946, after an illness of two years.

== Legacy ==
A 2002-2003 exhibition of his paintings was held at Iona College in New Rochelle, New York. A 2010 exhibit at St John Fisher College in Rochester, New York included Power O'Malley paintings from the collections of granddaughter Marietta Whittlesey and Ivan Lennon. In 2015 the Irish American Heritage Museum of Albany, New York presented the exhibition Visions of Ireland: The Artwork of Michael Augustine Power O'Malley. Additional paintings and other works are held by granddaughters Alexina de Koster and Ann Copeland.

Peter Murray, Curator of the Crawford Municipal Art Gallery in Cork, remarked that "in many ways, Power O'Malley is one of the forgotten artists of Ireland in the twentieth century… The capacity of Ireland so easily to forget those who have emigrated is perhaps unsurprising in a country that saw millions emigrate to the United States in the nineteenth century, only to witness a similar, if less desperate, mass exodus in the twentieth…"
