= Joseph Plunkett =

Irish republican, poet and journalist (1887-1916)

Joseph Plunkett Seosamh Pluincéid
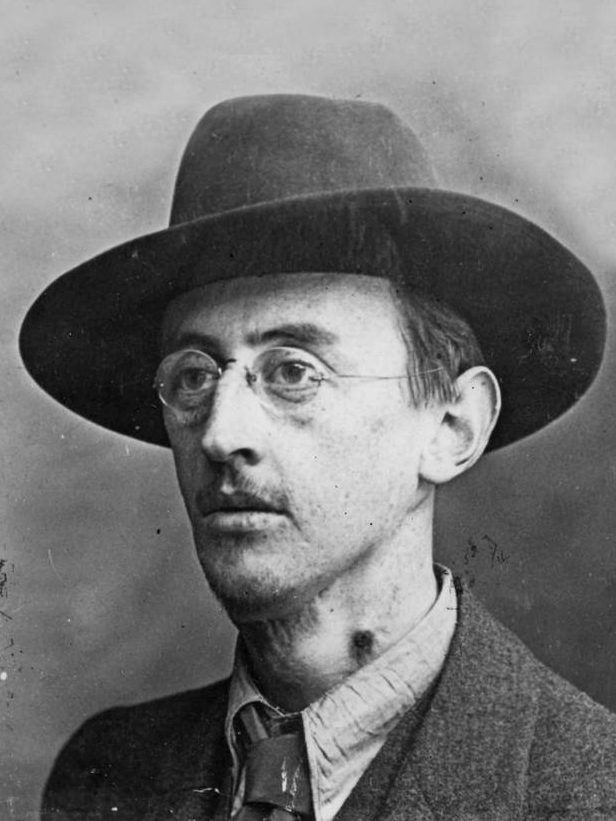
- Born: 21 December 1887; Dublin, Ireland
- Died: 4 May 1916 (aged 28); Kilmainham Gaol, Dublin, Ireland
- Cause of death: Execution by firing squad
- Burial place: Arbour Hill Prison, Dublin
- Spouse: Grace Gifford (m. 1916)
- Military career
- Allegiance: Irish Republic
- Branch: Irish Volunteers
- Service years: 1913–1916
- Rank: Commandant
- Commands: Director of Military Operations, GHQ
- Conflicts: Easter Rising
- Memorials: Waterford Plunkett railway station

Joseph Mary Plunkett (Irish: Seosamh Máire Pluincéid; 21 November 1887 – 4 May 1916) was an Irish republican, poet, and journalist. As a leader of the 1916 Easter Rising, he was one of the seven signatories to the Proclamation of the Irish Republic. Plunkett married Grace Gifford in 1916, seven hours before his execution.

== Background ==
Joseph Plunkett was born on 21 November 1887 at 26 Upper Fitzwilliam Street, in one of Dublin's most affluent districts. Both his parents came from wealthy backgrounds, and his father, George Noble Plunkett, had been made a papal count.

Plunkett contracted tuberculosis (TB) at a young age and spent part of his youth in the warmer climates of the Mediterranean and North Africa. He spent time in Algiers, where he studied Arabic literature and language and composed poetry in Arabic. He was educated at the Catholic University School (CUS) and by the Jesuits at Belvedere College in Dublin, and later at Stonyhurst College, in Lancashire, England, where he acquired some military knowledge from the Officers' Training Corps. Throughout his life, Plunkett took an active interest in Irish heritage and the Irish language, and also studied Esperanto. He was one of the founders of the Irish Esperanto Association in 1907.

He joined the Gaelic League and began studying with Thomas MacDonagh, with whom he formed a lifelong friendship. The two were both poets with an interest in theatre, and both were early members of the Irish Volunteers, joining their provisional committee. Plunkett's interest in Irish nationalism spread throughout his family, notably to his younger brothers George and John, as well as his father, who allowed his property in Kimmage, south Dublin, to be used as a training camp for young men who wished to escape conscription in Britain during the First World War.

== IRB involvement ==
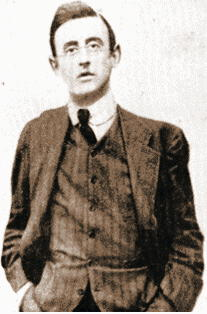
Plunkett c. 1910

Sometime in 1915, Plunkett joined the Irish Republican Brotherhood and soon afterwards was sent to Germany to meet with Roger Casement, who was negotiating with the German government on behalf of Ireland. Casement's role as emissary was self-appointed, and, as he was not a member of the IRB, its leadership wished to have one of their own contact Germany to negotiate German aid for an uprising the following year. He was seeking, but not limiting himself to, a shipment of arms. Casement, on the other hand, spent most of his energies recruiting Irish prisoners of war in Germany to form a brigade to fight for Ireland. Some nationalists in Ireland saw this as a fruitless endeavour and preferred to seek weapons. Plunkett successfully got a promise of a German arms shipment to coincide with the Rising.

According to Ernest Blythe, Plunkett's republicanism did not prevent him from suggesting, at a briefing of Irish Volunteer organisers in January 1915, that in certain circumstances it would be in Irish interests for a German Catholic prince to be crowned king of Ireland, nor did anyone present object. During the Easter Rising, Plunkett and Patrick Pearse argued in a conversation with Desmond Fitzgerald that it would be beneficial for Prince Joachim of Prussia to be crowned king.

== Easter Rising ==
Plunkett was one of the original members of the IRB Military Committee that was responsible for planning the Easter Rising, and it was largely his plan that was followed. Shortly before the rising was to begin, Plunkett was hospitalised following a turn for the worse in his health. He had an operation on tubercular glands in his neck days before Easter and had to struggle out of bed to take part in what followed. Still bandaged, he took his place in the General Post Office with several other leaders such as Patrick Pearse and Tom Clarke, though his health prevented him from being active.

Margaret Skinnider recalls that during Easter Week he was "pale and weak" and "looked like death".

His aide de camp was the then 25-year-old Michael Collins.

== Marriage and execution ==
Following the surrender, Plunkett was held in Kilmainham Gaol and faced a court martial. On 3 May, McDonagh was executed, and Grace received news that Plunkett was to be executed the following morning. She purchased a ring from a jeweller in Dublin and persuaded a priest to let her marry Plunkett before his execution. They were married in the prison chapel in Kilmainham jail just hours before his death. There were only two witnesses, guards John Smith and John Lockerby, in addition to the priest. Grace was awoken at 2 am and taken back to the jail, where they had their final meeting, with a guard counting down the 15 minutes they had together. Plunkett was executed soon afterwards, along with the other 13 leaders.

== Aftermath/legacy ==
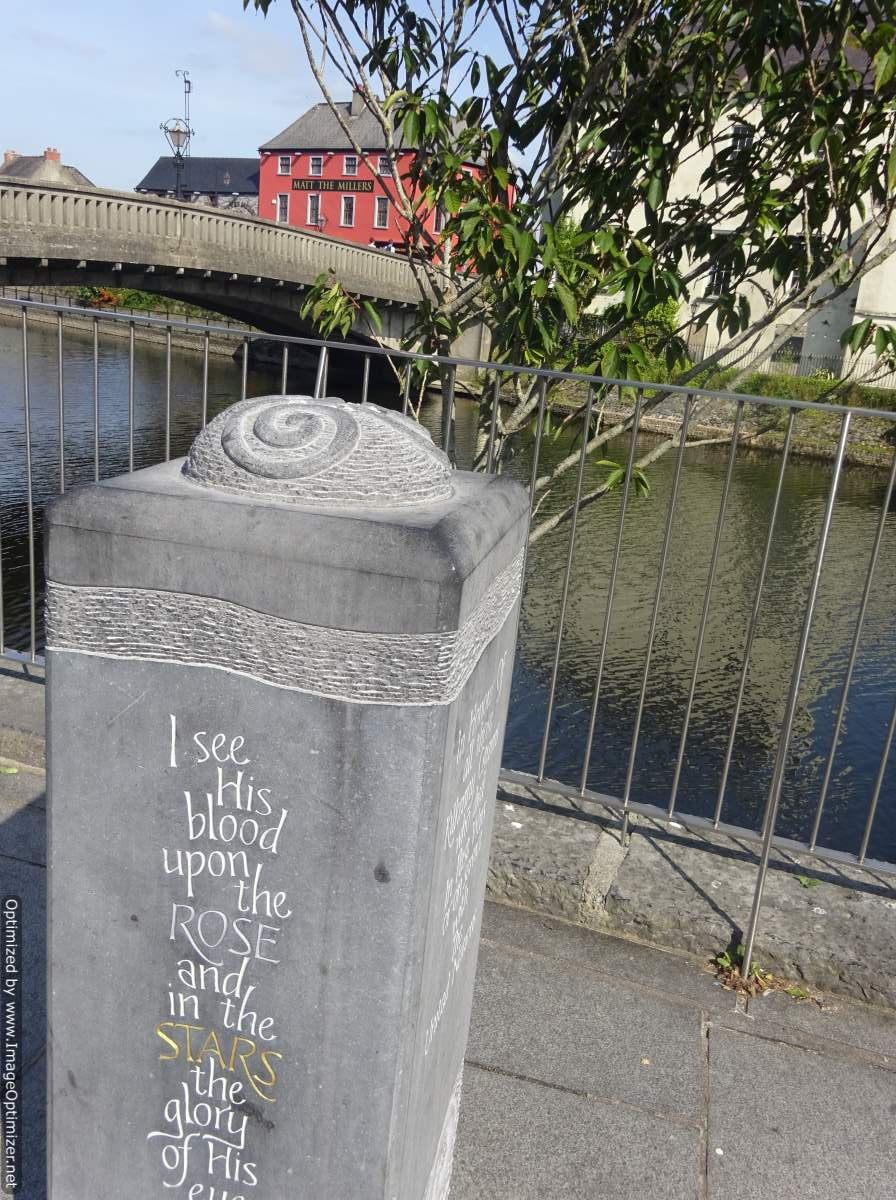
Plunkett poem on a war memorial in Kilkenny

His brothers George Oliver Plunkett and Jack Plunkett joined him in the Easter Rising and later became important IRA men. His father's cousin, Horace Plunkett, was a Protestant and unionist who sought to reconcile unionists and nationalists. Horace Plunkett's home was burned down by the Anti-Treaty IRA during the Civil War.

Plunkett named his sister, Geraldine, the literary executor of his will. She published a volume of his poetry a month after his execution in June 1916.

The main railway station in Waterford City is named after him, as was Joseph Plunkett Tower in Ballymun, a block of flats that has since been demolished. Plunkett barracks in the Curragh Camp, County Kildare, is also named after him.

== In popular culture ==
The Irish ballad "Grace", written by Seán and Frank O'Meara, is a monologue of Plunkett expressing his love to Grace and his love for the cause of Irish independence in the small hours before his execution. The ballad has been covered by artists including The Wolfe Tones, Jim McCann, and Rod Stewart.

American composer Florence Turner-Maley used Plunkett's text in her song "I See Him Everywhere".

His religious poem "I See His Blood upon the Rose" is well known in Ireland.

Plunkett was portrayed by London actor Frank Bourke in the documentary mini‑series 1916 The Easter Seven.
