= MacSwiney =

MacSwiney is a surname. Notable people with the surname include:

- Máire MacSwiney Brugha, Irish author
- Mary MacSwiney (1872–1942), Irish politician and educationalist
- Muriel MacSwiney, Irish nationalist
- Patrick MacSwiney (1885–1940), Irish Catholic priest and historian
- Patrick MacSwiney, 1st Marquis MacSwiney of Mashanaglass (1871–1945), Franco-Irish officer of the papal household
- Seán MacSwiney, Irish Sinn Féin politician
- Terence MacSwiney (1879–1920), Sinn Féin Lord Mayor of Cork during the Irish War of Independence, died on hunger strike in British jail
