= Brugha =

Brugha is a surname. Notable people with the surname include:

- Caitlín Brugha (1879–1959), Irish Sinn Féin politician
- Cathal Brugha (1874–1922), Irish revolutionary and politician
- Ruairí Brugha (1917–2006), Irish Republican and IRA volunteer who became a Fianna Fáil politician

== See also ==
- Cathal Brugha Barracks, Irish Army barracks in Rathmines, Dublin
- Cathal Brugha Street, street on the northside of Dublin, Ireland
