= Cathal MacSwiney Brugha =

Irish academic and scientist (born 1949)

Dr Cathal MacSwiney Brugha
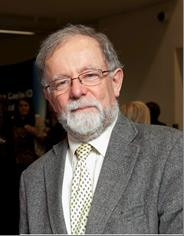
- Born: Cathal Toirdhealbheadh MacSwiney Brugha; 13 January 1949 (age 77); Dublin, Ireland
- Education: Gonzaga College; University College Dublin; Trinity College Dublin
- Children: 5
- Parent(s): Ruairi Brugha and Máire MacSwiney Brugha

Cathal MacSwiney Brugha (born 13 January 1949) is an Irish decision scientist, the Emeritus Professor of Decision Analytics at University College Dublin's College of Business. He has applied his main field of nomology to decision analytics, multi-criteria decision-making, conflict resolution, protecting endangered languages, decision-making in rural Tanzania, strategy in China, and Irish politics. He is President of the Analytics Society of Ireland. His main research projects have been in Europe, Asia and Africa.

== Early life ==
Brugha was born into a prominent Irish political family, the son of Ruairí Brugha and Máire MacSwiney Brugha and grandson of Terence MacSwiney and Muriel MacSwiney, Cathal Brugha and Caitlín Brugha. Brugha earned a BSc, an MSc (Mathematical Science – UCD), a PhD (Combinatorial Optimization - UCD) and MBA (TCD) Prize winner for his dissertation.

== Career ==
Brugha is Emeritus Professor of Decision Analytics at the Business School, University College Dublin; he remains an adjunct professor at the Smurfit and Quinn, Schools of Business, University College Dublin. He was the founding Director, UCD Centre for Business Analytics and of the College of Marketing and Design, now part of Technological University Dublin. Fellow of the Marketing Institute of Ireland.

From 2000 to 2006 Brugha was editor of the IFORS Journal: International Transactions in Operational Research. He is a co-author of Doing Business in China: The Irish Experience (2010) and Doing Business With China, the Irish Advantage and Challenge (2016)

Brugha is President of the Analytics Society of Ireland and Fellow of the Marketing Institute of Ireland. He served as Honorary Professor at the Techno India University in Kolkata, India. Brugha applied the principles of nomology to areas including conflict resolution, endangered languages, rural planning in Tanzania, strategy in China and political analysis. He was co-organiser of the Conference of the Association of European Operational Research Societies EURO2019 UCD. Received the EURO distinguished service award in 2022.

Brugha was a visiting professor at the Academy of Mathematics and Systems Science, China Academy of Science in Beijing, the School of Economics and Management, Xidian University, Xi’an, China, and the University Dar es Salaam, Tanzania.

== Personal life ==
Brugha married in 1977 and had five children. Together with his wife, Brugha founded the Racquetball Association of Ireland and brought its first team to the World Games in California in 1981.

From 1971-1984 Brugha was a member of National Executive of Fianna Fáil party.
