= Seán MacSwiney =

Irish politician (1878–1942)

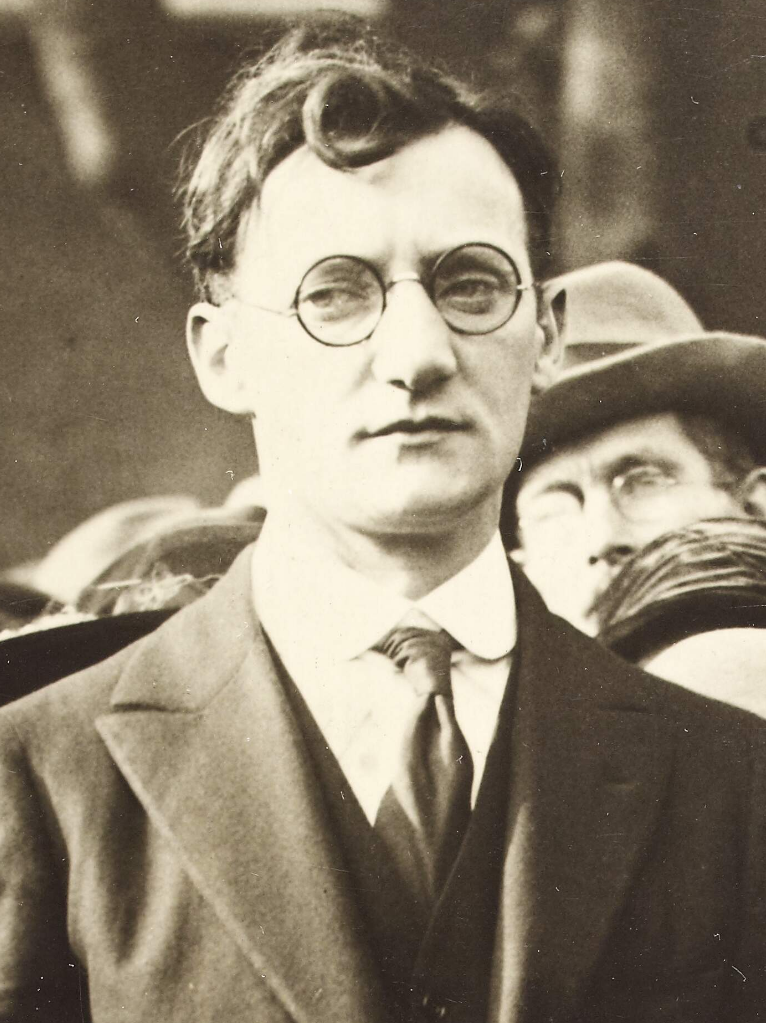
- MacSwiney in 1920

Teachta Dála
- In office May 1921 – June 1922
- Constituency: Cork Mid, North, South, South East and West

Personal details
- Born: John Joseph Patrick MacSwiney; 19 March 1878 Cork, Ireland
- Died: 22 January 1942 (aged 63) Cork, Ireland
- Party: Sinn Féin
- Relatives: Terence MacSwiney (brother); Mary MacSwiney (sister); Muriel MacSwiney (sister-in-law)

Military service
- Branch/service: Irish Republican Army; Anti-Treaty IRA
- Rank: Quartermaster
- Battles/wars: Irish War of Independence; Irish Civil War

Seán MacSwiney (19 March 1878 – 22 January 1942) was an officer in the Irish Republican Army and Sinn Féin politician.

== Biography ==
He was born at 23 North Main Street, Cork city to John McSwiney, a tobacco manufacturer, and Mary Wilkinson. He was the brother of Terence MacSwiney and Mary MacSwiney.

In 1914, he was in Canada, where spent time in custody as a result of his activities against conscription when it was introduced during World War I.

During the Irish War of Independence, he served as an officer in Cork No 1 Brigade in the Irish Republican Army.

Terence, then a Sinn Féin Teachta Dála (TD) and the Lord Mayor of Cork, died on hunger strike in 1920. He was elected at the 1921 elections for the Cork Mid, North, South, South East and West constituency and became a member of the Second Dáil. His sister Mary was elected for the Cork Borough constituency at the same election. Captured in 1921, he was sentenced to death, later commuted to 15 years' penal servitude. A few months into his sentence, in April 1921, he escaped from Spike Island.

He opposed the Anglo-Irish Treaty and voted against it (as did his sister Mary). During the Irish Civil War, he was quartermaster for the 1st Southern Division of the anti-Treaty IRA and served on the IRA executive. He evaded capture until after the IRA called a ceasefire, and in November 1923 he was arrested in Kerry and interned.

He was defeated at the 1922 general election. In 1933, standing on a Republican ticket, he was elected to Cork Corporation. In 1936 MacSwiney and Tomás Mac Curtain's son Tomas Og were imprisoned in Arbour Hill.

He died, aged 63, at Glenvera private hospital, Cork.

== See also ==
- Families in the Oireachtas

Dáil	Election	Deputy (Party)	Deputy (Party)	Deputy (Party)	Deputy (Party)	Deputy (Party)	Deputy (Party)	Deputy (Party)	Deputy (Party)
2nd	1921	Seán MacSwiney (SF)	Seán Nolan (SF)	Seán Moylan (SF)	Daniel Corkery (SF)	Michael Collins (SF)	Seán Hales (SF)	Seán Hayes (SF)	Patrick O'Keeffe (SF)
3rd	1922	Michael Bradley (Lab)	Thomas Nagle (Lab)	Seán Moylan (AT-SF)	Daniel Corkery (AT-SF)	Michael Collins (PT-SF)	Seán Hales (PT-SF)	Seán Hayes (PT-SF)	Daniel Vaughan (FP)
4th	1923	Constituency abolished. See Cork North and Cork West							
