= Annie M. P. Smithson =

Irish novelist, poet and Nationalist

Annie Mary Patricia Smithson (26 September 1873 – 21 February 1948) was an Irish novelist, poet and Nationalist.

== Background and career ==
Smithson was born into a Protestant family in Sandymount, Dublin. She was christened Margaret Anne Jane, but took the names Anne Mary Patricia on her conversion to Catholicism. Her mother and father were first cousins and her father died when she was young. About 1881 her mother married her second husband, Peter Longshaw, who owned a chemical factory in Warrington in Lancashire. Smithson disliked her stepfather and referred to him always as Mr. Longshaw. There were five children of the second marriage.

Smithson abandoned her ambition to become a journalist in order to train as a nurse and a midwife. She trained in London and Edinburgh, before returning to Dublin in 1900. In 1901 she took up a post as district nurse in Millton, Co. Down. There she fell in love with her colleague Dr. James Manton, a married man. Deciding that a relationship was impossible, she left Millton in 1906. They kept up a correspondence until her conversion, when she burnt his letters.

She converted to Catholicism in March 1907 and became a fervent Republican and Nationalist. She became a member of Cumann na mBan and campaigned for Sinn Féin in the 1918 general election.

She took the Republican side in the Irish Civil War and nursed participants in the siege at Moran's Hotel. In 1922 she was imprisoned by Free State forces and was rescued from Mullingar prison by Linda Kearns McWhinney and Muriel MacSwiney, posing as a Red Cross delegation. Her political views led to her resignation from the Queen's Nurses Committee and a move into private nursing. In 1924 she wrote a series of articles on child welfare work for the Evening Mail newspaper, based on her work in tenements in the Dublin Liberties, one of the poorest areas of the city, where she continued to work until 1929.

She was Secretary and Organiser of the Irish Nurses Organisation from 1929 to 1942. She wrote for the Irish Nurses' Magazine and edited the Irish Nurses Union Gazette.

In 1917, she published her first novel, Her Irish Heritage, which became a best-seller. It was dedicated to those who died in the Easter Rising of 1916. In all, she published twenty novels and two short story collections. Other successful novels included By Strange Paths and The Walk of a Queen. Many of her works are highly romantic and draw on her own life experiences, with nationalism and Catholicism featuring as recurrent themes. In 1944 she published her autobiography, Myself – and Others.

From 1932 onward, she shared a house in Rathmines, Dublin with her stepsister and her stepsister's family. She died of heart failure at 12 Richmond Hill, Dublin and was buried in Whitechurch, County Dublin.

Her novels feature in Brian Friel's 1990 play Dancing at Lughnasa. Between 1989 and 1990 the Mercier Press reprinted several of her works.

== Select bibliography ==
- Her Irish Heritage (1917)
- By Strange Paths (1919)
- Carmen Cavanagh (1921)
- The Walk of a Queen (1922)
- Nora Connor: A Romance of Yesteryear (1924)
- The Laughter of Sorrow (1925)
- These Things: The Romance of a Dancer (1927)
- Sheila of the O'Beirnes (1929)
- Traveller’s Joy (1930)
- For God and Ireland (1931)
- Leaves of Myrtle (1932)
- The Light of Other Days (1933)
- The Marriage of Nurse Harding (1935)
- The White Owl (1937)
- Margaret of Fair Hill (1939)
- The Wicklow Heather (1939)
- The Weldons of Tibradden (1940)
- By Shadowed Ways (1942)
- Tangled Threads (1943)
- Paid in Full (1946)

== Autobiography ==
- Smithson, Annie M. P. (1944). Myself—And Others. Dublin: The Talbot Press Limited.
