= Máire MacSwiney Brugha =

Activist and writer

- Born: Máire MacSwiney; 23 June 1918; Cork, Ireland
- Died: 20 May 2012 (aged 93); Dublin, Ireland
- Notable work: History's Daughter: A Memoir from the Only Child of Terence MacSwiney
- Spouse: Ruairí Brugha
- Children: 4; including Cathal MacSwiney Brugha
- Parents: Terence MacSwiney (father); Muriel MacSwiney (mother)

Máire MacSwiney Brugha (23 June 1918 – 20 May 2012) was an Irish activist who was the daughter of Terence MacSwiney and niece of Mary MacSwiney. As well as an activist she was also an author and is now regarded as a person of historical importance.

== Early life ==
MacSwiney Brugha was the daughter of the former lord mayor of Cork Terence MacSwiney and his wife Muriel Frances Murphy. Her father died on hunger strike when she was 2 years old. Her father was in jail when she was born and didn't see her until she was three months old, when she was brought to see him. Her family's republican and political activities left a strong mark on her life.

Once her father died her mother moved to Dublin. MacSwiney went to live with Nancy O'Rahilly, widow of The O'Rahilly, and saw her mother intermittently. Although as a child her parents decided she would speak Irish, her father's death and her mother's health meant that she was moved to Germany in 1923 and there she was moved around a lot. She learned German and spoke no English and little or no Irish. In 1930 MacSwiney was moved to Grainau, in Bavaria where she attended school. Her aunt Mary MacSwiney, a legal guardian of hers, eventually came to collect her and took her back to Ireland. This caused a court case when it was claimed her aunt had kidnapped her. As a result of the court case her aunt was given custody, and she and her mother became estranged.

== Education and career ==
MacSwiney attended Scoil Íte and then St. Louis convent in Monaghan where, in 1936, she completed her Leaving Certificate and got a scholarship to University College Cork to study arts. In 1937 MacSwiney played the lead role in a play, The Revolutionist was published in 1914, written by her father and produced by her aunt. She returned to Germany in 1938 to keep up her German and graduated with a first-class honours degree. She went on to get her Higher Diploma and became a teacher. She spent some time teaching in Scoil Íte and then went to Dublin in 1942 to get a master's degree. She met Ruairí Brugha while in Dublin. His father, Cathal Brugha, was killed in the Irish Civil War in 1922 . She married 10 July 1945. They had Deirdre, Cathal, Traolach and Ruairí.

== Married life ==
Her husband had a strong political career with her support. He was a senator, a TD, and a member of the European Parliament. MacSwiney Brugha lead her Fianna Fáil cumann and volunteered with the aid agency Gorta. Her husband was Official Opposition Spokesman on Northern Ireland from 1975 to 1977. Through this the couple were involved in creating the policy of developing conciliation rather than ending partition, which they previously had been focused on. At the age of 85 and after her sight had failed, she dictated her story to her daughter-in-law, Catherine Brugha. History's Daughter: A Memoir from the Only Child of Terence MacSwiney was launched in 2005. Her own story was recorded in Irish Life and Lore. Her story was also the subject of a radio production.

Fianna Fáil leader Micheál Martin described her as having made a "strong and valued" contribution to the development of Fianna Fáil while Gerry Adams said she "made her mark" on Irish history.
