= Terence MacSwiney =

Irish writer and politician (1879–1920)

- MacSwiney in his graduation gown, 1907

Teachta Dála
- In office December 1918 – 25 October 1920
- Constituency: Cork Mid

Lord Mayor of Cork
- In office March 1920 – October 1920
- Constituency: Cork County Council

Personal details
- Born: Terence James MacSwiney; 28 March 1879 Cork, Ireland
- Died: 25 October 1920 (aged 41) Brixton Prison, London, England
- Cause of death: Hunger strike
- Resting place: St. Finbarr's Cemetery, Cork
- Party: Sinn Féin
- Spouse: Muriel Murphy (m. 1917)
- Children: Máire
- Relatives: Mary MacSwiney (sister); Seán MacSwiney (brother); Ruairí Brugha (son-in-law)

Terence James MacSwiney (/məkˈswiːni/; Irish: Toirdhealbhach Mac Suibhne; 28 March 1879 – 25 October 1920) was an Irish playwright, author and politician. He was elected as Sinn Féin Lord Mayor of Cork during the Irish War of Independence in 1920. He was arrested by the British Government on charges of sedition and imprisoned in Brixton Prison. His death there in October 1920 after 74 days on hunger strike brought him and the Irish Republican campaign to international attention.

== Background ==
Born at 23 North Main Street, Cork, MacSwiney was one of eight children. His father, John MacSwiney, of Cork, who had volunteered in 1868 to fight as a papal guard against Garibaldi, had been a schoolteacher in London and later opened a tobacco factory in Cork. Following the failure of this business, John emigrated to Australia in 1885 leaving Terence and the other children in the care of their mother and the eldest daughter.

MacSwiney's mother, Mary (née Wilkinson), was an English Catholic with strong Irish nationalist opinions. Terence was educated by the Christian Brothers at the North Monastery school in Cork city but left at fifteen to help support the family. He became an accountancy clerk but continued his studies and matriculated successfully. He continued in full-time employment while he studied at Queen's College, Cork, graduating from the Royal University with a degree in Mental and Moral Science in 1907.

In 1901 he helped to found the Celtic Literary Society, and in 1908 he founded the Cork Dramatic Society with Daniel Corkery and wrote a number of plays for them. His first play The Last Warriors of Coole was produced in 1910. His fifth play The Revolutionist (1914) took the political stand made by a single man as its theme. In addition to his work as a playwright, he also wrote pamphlets on Irish history.

== Political activity ==
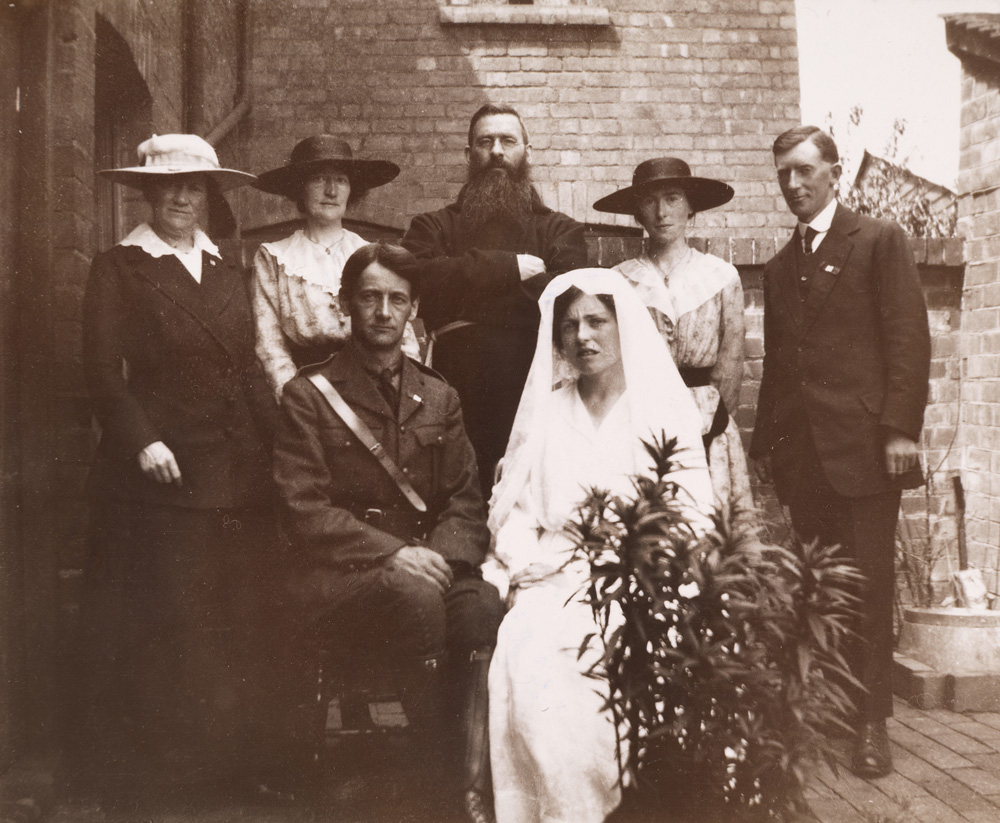
The MacSwineys on their wedding day. The best man Richard Mulcahy can be seen on the right.

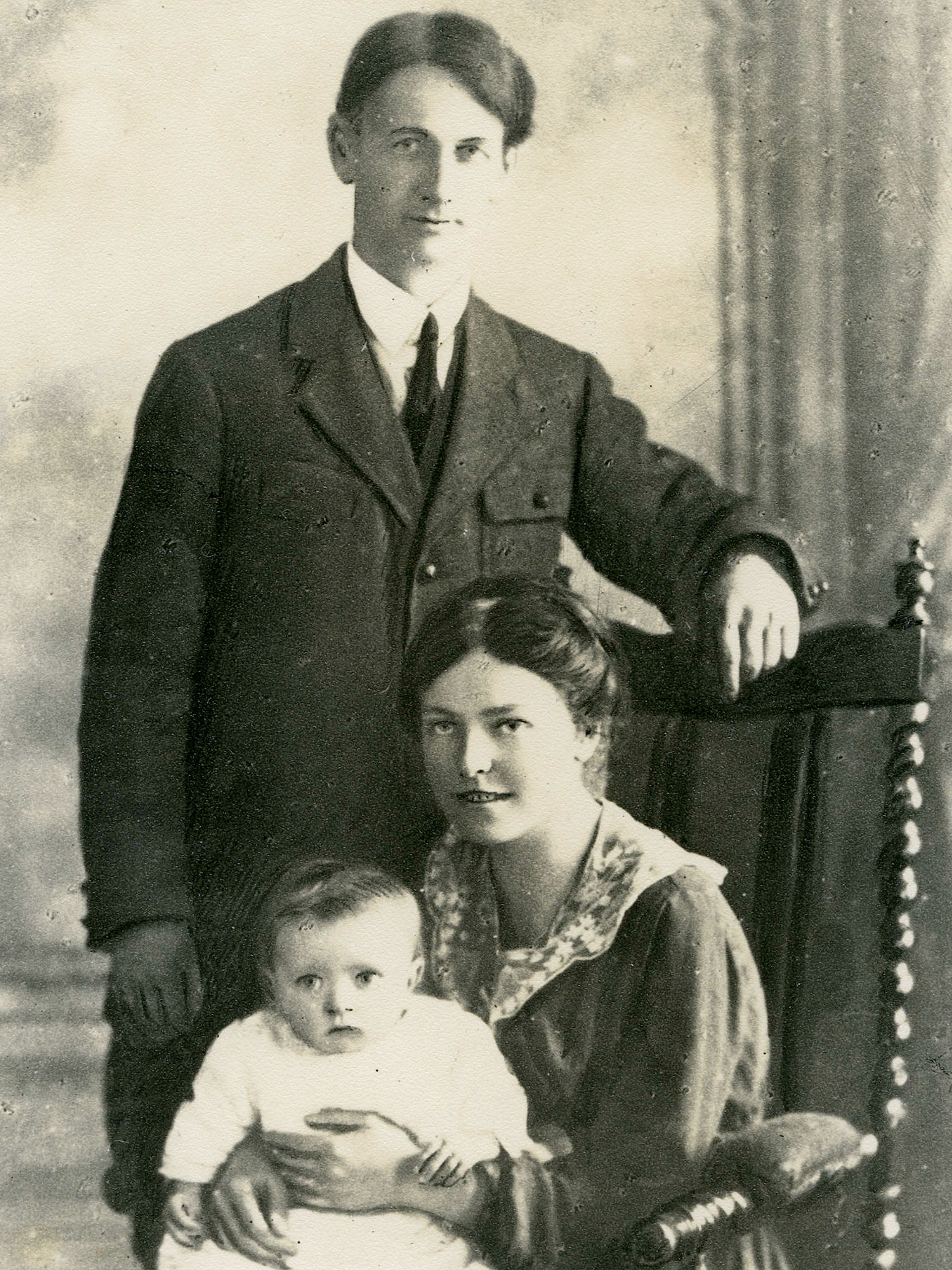
Terence, Muriel and daughter Máire in circa May 1919

Described as a sensitive poet-intellectual, MacSwiney's writings in the newspaper Irish Freedom brought him to the attention of the Irish Republican Brotherhood. In 1913, he was one of the founders of the Cork Brigade of the Irish Volunteers, and was President of the Cork branch of Sinn Féin. In 1914, he founded a newspaper, Fianna Fáil, which was suppressed after only 11 issues.

At Christmas 1915, MacSwiney spent a night at the home of the Fleischmanns. While there, he met a friend of his sisters, Muriel Murphy. She was from a rich brewing family in Cork with conservative politics, but in 1915 she became a member of the Gaelic League and Cumann na mBan. MacSwiney and Murphy continued to see each other after the night at the Fleischmanns.

In April 1916, he was intended to be second in command of the Easter Rising in Cork and Kerry, but stood down his forces on the order of Eoin MacNeill. Amongst the confusion about whether to mobilise his forces or not, Muriel Murphy brought him food and information as his forces held up at Volunteer Hall in Cork City.

Following the rising, MacSwiney was imprisoned until December 1916 in Reading and Wakefield Gaols by the British Government, under the Defence of the Realm Act. In February 1917, he was deported from Ireland and imprisoned in Shrewsbury and Bromyard internment camps until his release in June 1917. Muriel followed Terence to England to support him and, upon his release, the two were married on 9 June 1917 in Bromyard, England, one day after Murphy's 25th birthday, and one day after she was eligible for her inheritance, ensuring the independence of the couple from the Murphy family, which had disapproved of the relationship every step of the way. Muriel's bridesmaid was Geraldine O'Sullivan (Neeson), while Terence's best man was Richard Mulcahy.

In November 1917, MacSwiney was arrested in Cork for wearing an Irish Volunteers uniform, and, inspired by the example of Thomas Ashe, went on a hunger strike for three days prior to his release.

In the 1918 general election, MacSwiney was returned unopposed as the member for Mid Cork, representing Sinn Féin, succeeding the Nationalist MP D. D. Sheehan. However, along with 27 other elected members, MacSwiney joined the first Dáil Éireann rather than take up his seat in the UK Parliament. After the murder on 20 March 1920 of his friend Tomás Mac Curtain, the Lord Mayor of Cork, MacSwiney was elected Lord Mayor. Richard Mulcahy wrote to MacSwiney on 8 April 1920 to warn him he was in danger and asking him to agree to have Mulcahy's men protect him at all times, "after what has happened in Cork" (likely a reference to MacCurtain's death less than a month earlier). On 12 August 1920, MacSwiney was arrested in Cork for possession of "seditious articles and documents", and possession of a cypher key. He was summarily tried by a court on 16 August and sentenced to two years' imprisonment at Brixton Prison in England.

== Hunger strike and death ==
On 12 August, the day he was imprisoned in Cork, MacSwiney joined the prisoners there who had started the 1920 Cork hunger strike one day prior. However, he was transferred to Brixton Prison soon after, where he continued his hunger strike. On 26 August, the British cabinet stated that "the release of the Lord Mayor would have disastrous results in Ireland and would probably lead to a mutiny of both military and police in south of Ireland."

MacSwiney's hunger strike gained world attention. In response to the strike, 3,000 longshoremen in the United States pledged to refused to load goods for British-flagged merchantmen until all British forces were withdrawn from Ireland, and four South American nations appealed for Pope Benedict XV to intervene. Protests in support of the strikers were held in France and Germany, while the Australian MP Hugh Mahon was expelled from the Parliament of Australia for "seditious and disloyal utterances at a public meeting" after claiming that the sobs of MacSwiney's widow would one day shake the foundations of "this bloody and accursed Empire". Two weeks later, the Autonomous Center of Employees of Commerce and Industry (CADCI), a Catalan nationalist organization, sent a petition to British Prime Minister David Lloyd George calling for MacSwiney's release and the newspaper of the organization, Acció (Action in English), began a campaign in support of MacSwiney.

Prison officials often placed food near MacSwiney to persuade him to give up the hunger strike. Attempts at force-feeding MacSwiney were undertaken in the final days of his strike. On 20 October 1920, he fell into a coma and died five days later after being on hunger strike for 74 days. His body was laid in St George's Cathedral, Southwark, where 30,000 people filed past it. Two other Cork Irish Republicans Joe Murphy and Michael Fitzgerald died while on hunger strike in October 1920, Murphy died on the same day as MacSwiney.

MacSwiney's family planned on having his body taken to Dublin, but British authorities feared it would lead to large-scale demonstrations and diverted his coffin directly to Cork, reportedly on the insistence of Sir Henry Wilson, 1st Baronet. MacSwiney's funeral in the Cathedral of St Mary and St Anne on 31 October attracted large crowds, and he was buried in the Republican plot in St. Finbarr's Cemetery, Cork. Arthur Griffith delivered the graveside oration.

== Legacy ==
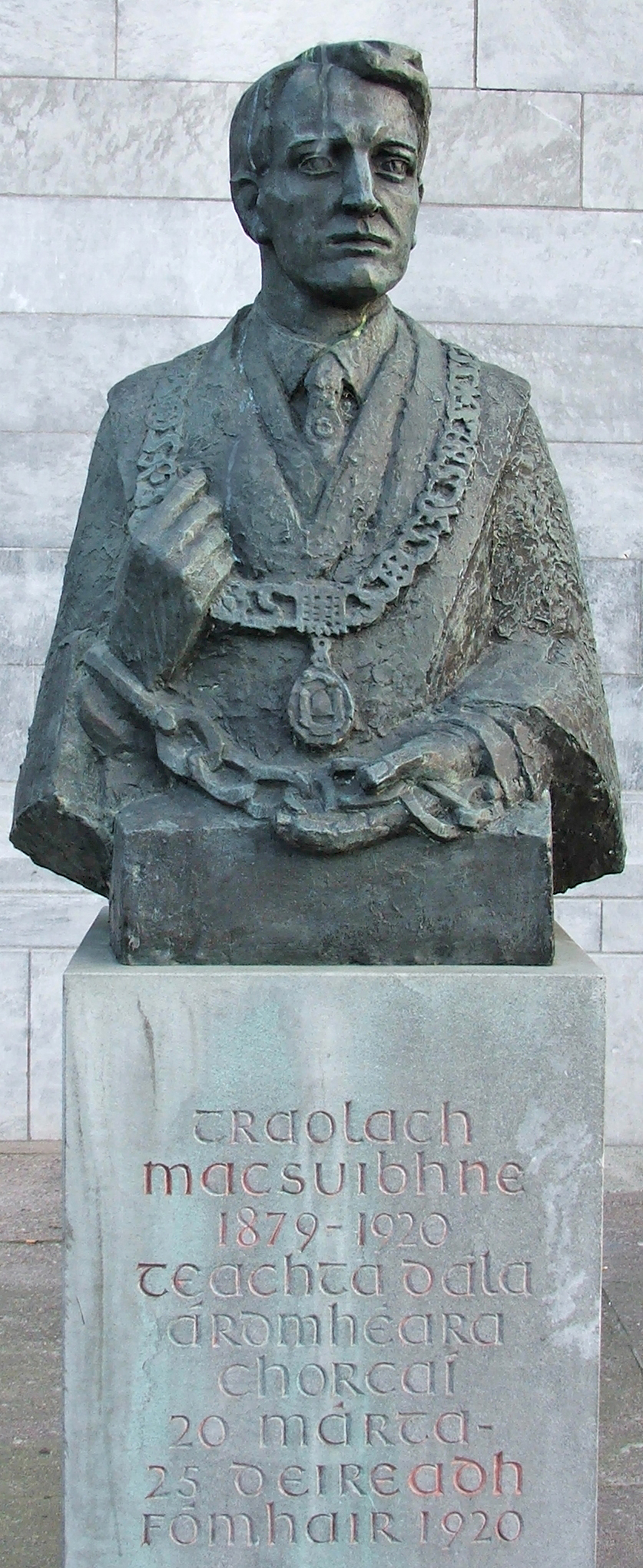
A bust of Terence MacSwiney outside Cork City Hall. The text, written in Irish, translates as: Terence MacSwiney 1879–1920 Teachta Dála Lord Mayor of Cork 20 March – 25 October 1920

A collection of his political writings, entitled Principles of Freedom, was published posthumously in 1921. It was based upon articles MacSwiney contributed to Irish Freedom during 1911–1912. His collected works, prose, plays and poetry, The Art and Ideology of Terence MacSwiney: Caught in the Living Flame, were published in 2023.

MacSwiney's life and work had a particular impact in India. Jawaharlal Nehru took inspiration from MacSwiney's example and writings, and Mahatma Gandhi counted him among his influences. Principles of Freedom was translated into various Indian languages including Telugu. The Indian revolutionary Bhagat Singh was an admirer of MacSwiney and wrote about him in his memoirs. When Singh's father petitioned the British colonial authorities to pardon his son, Bhagat Singh quoted Terence MacSwiney and said "I am confident that my death will do more to smash the British Empire than my release" and told his father to withdraw the petition. He was executed on 23 March 1931 with two other men after being convicted of a murdering a British police officer.

Other figures beyond India who counted MacSwiney as an influence include Ho Chi Minh, who was working in London at the time of MacSwiney's death and said of him, "A nation that has such citizens will never surrender". On 1 November 1920, the Catalan organization CADCI held a demonstration in Barcelona, where the poet and politician Ventura Gassol delivered an original poem extolling MacSwiney. Chinese poet Guo Moruo wrote a poem about MacSwiney.

In Ireland MacSwiney's sister Mary MacSwiney took on his seat in the Dáil and spoke against the Anglo-Irish Treaty in January 1922. His brother Seán MacSwiney was also elected in the 1921 elections for another Cork constituency. He also opposed the Treaty.

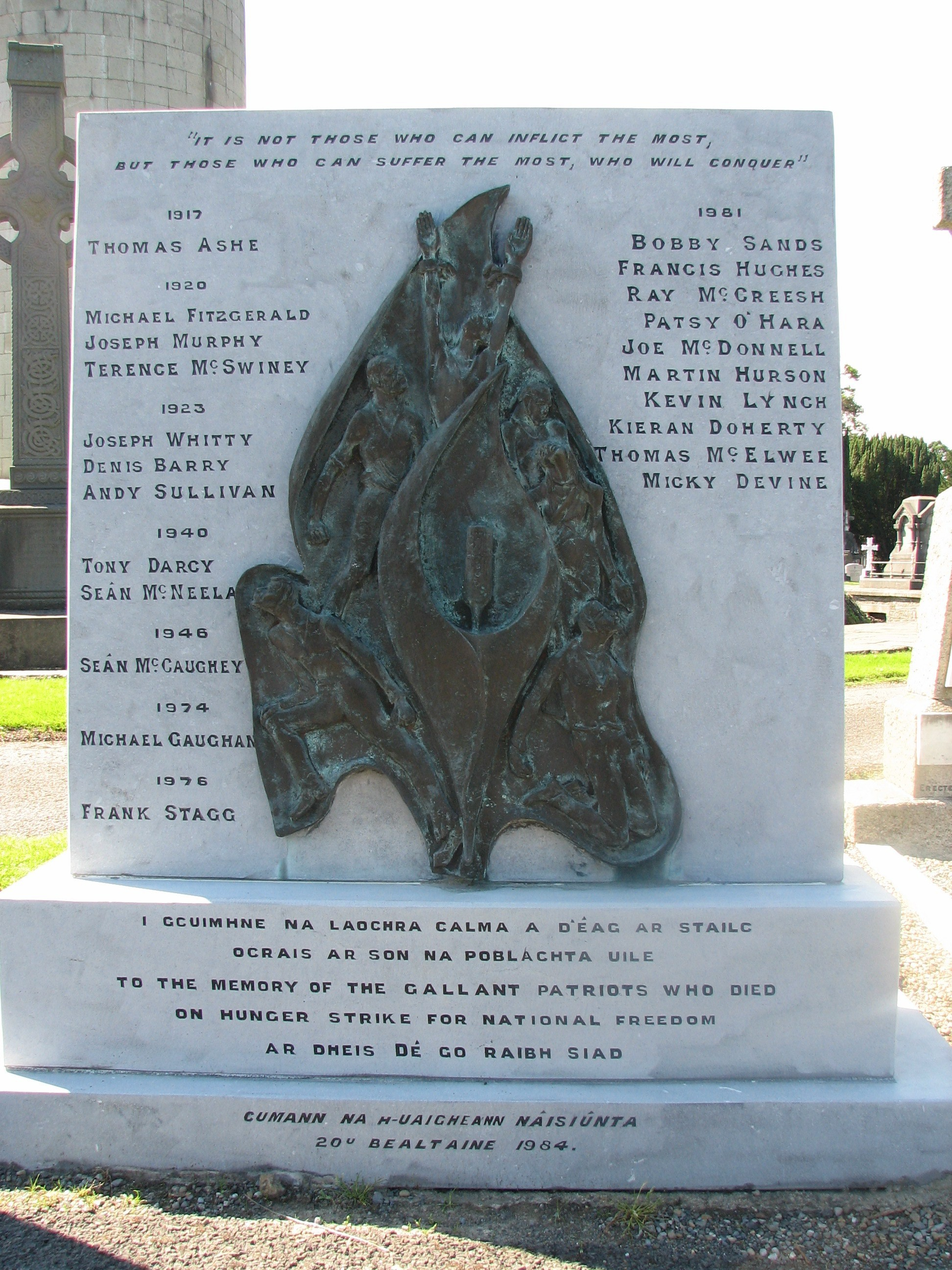
Hunger Strikers Memorial Glasnevin Cemetery Dublin

MacSwiney's hunger strike set an example for future hunger strikers with nationwide strikes taking place during the 1923 Irish Hunger Strikes.

In 1945 his only child, Máire MacSwiney, married Ruairí Brugha, son of the nationalist Teachta Dála Cathal Brugha. Ruairí later became a TD, Member of the European Parliament, and Senator. Máire MacSwiney is the author of a memoir History's Daughter: A Memoir from the Only Child of Terence MacSwiney (2006). She died in May 2012.

A collection of artefacts relating to MacSwiney's life is held at Cork Public Museum. His portrait, and a painting of his funeral mass, by Sir John Lavery, are exhibited in Cork's Crawford Art Gallery. There is also a secondary school named after him on the north side of Cork City, with a room dedicated to his memory.

On 28 October 2012, there was a friendship tree planting in memory of MacSwiney in Southwark. The Paris-based Irish-American composer Swan Hennessy (1866–1929) dedicated his String Quartet No. 2, Op. 49 (1920) to the memory of MacSwiney ("à la Mémoire de Terence McSwiney, Lord Mayor de Cork"). It was first performed in Paris, on 25 January 1922, by an Irish quartet led by Arthur Darley.

== Writings ==
- The Music of Freedom, by 'Cuireadóir' (poems; Cork: The Risen Gaedheal Press, 1907).
- Fianna Fáil: The Irish Army: A Journal for Militant Ireland, a weekly publication edited and mainly written by MacSwiney; Cork, 11 issues (September to December 1914).
- The Revolutionist; a play in five acts (Dublin & London: Maunsel and Co., 1914) Internet Archive.
- The Ethics of Revolt: A Discussion from a Catholic Point of View as to When it Becomes Lawful to Rise in Revolt Against the Civil Power, by Toirdhealbhach Mac Suibhne (pamphlet, 1918).
- Battle-cries (poems, 1918).
- Principles of Freedom (Dublin: The Talbot Press, 1921).
- Despite Fools' Laughter. Poems by Terence MacSwiney; edited by B. G. MacCarthy (Dublin: M. H. Gill and Son, 1944).

== Quotes ==
- "It is not those who can inflict the most, but those who can suffer the most who will conquer." (Some sources replace "conquer" with "prevail")
- "I am confident that my death will do more to smash the British Empire than my release." (On his hunger strike)
- "I want you to bear witness that I die as a Soldier of the Irish Republic." His last words to a visiting priest.
- "If I die the fruit will exceed the cost a thousand fold. The thought of it makes me happy. I thank God for it."

== See also ==
- Families in the Oireachtas
- Kevin Barry
- List of members of the Oireachtas imprisoned during the Irish revolutionary period

== Bibliography ==
- Francis J Costello, Enduring the Most: The Biography of Terence McSwiney. Dingle: Brandon Books, 1996.
- Robert Welch (ed), The Oxford Companion to Irish Literature. Oxford: Clarendon Press, 1996.
- Máire MacSwiney Brugha History's Daughter: a Memoir from the Only Child of Terence MacSwiney. Dublin: O'Brien Press, 2006.
- Terence Mac Swiney's private papers are held in the University College Dublin Archives (IE UCDA P48b, P48c). There are also manuscript papers and copies of his published writings in the National Library of Ireland (MSS 35029–35035).

Parliament of the United Kingdom
Preceded by D. D. Sheehan	Member of Parliament for Cork Mid; 1918–1920	Vacant
Oireachtas
New office	Teachta Dála for Cork Mid; 1918–1920	Vacant
Civic offices
Preceded by Tomás Mac Curtain	Lord Mayor of Cork; 1920	Succeeded by Donal O'Callaghan
