= Mary MacSwiney =

Irish politician and teacher (1872–1942)

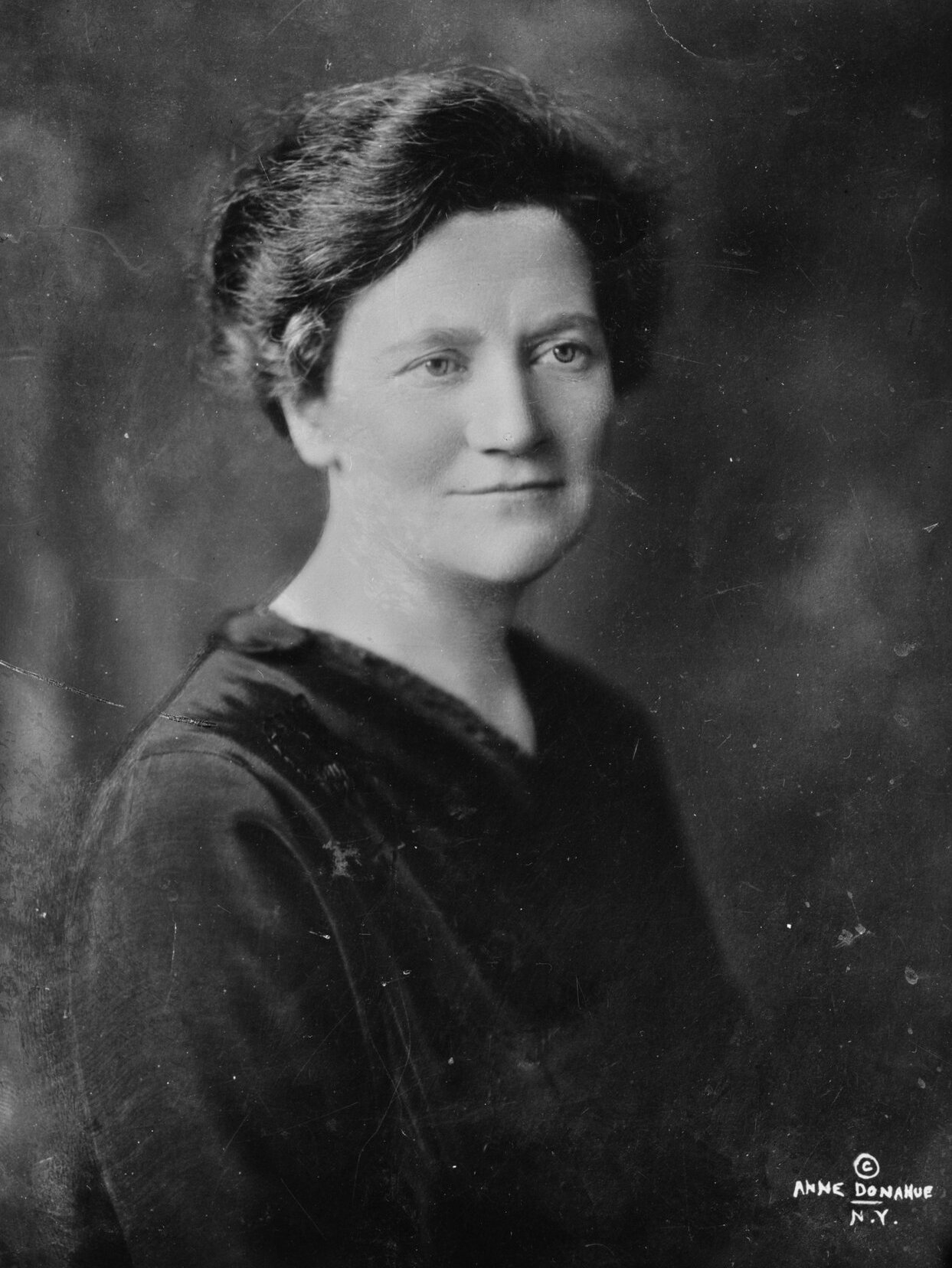

Vice President of Sinn Féin
- In office 1927–1933
- Leader: John J. O'Kelly; Brian O'Higgins
- Preceded by: Kathleen Lynn
- Succeeded by: Margaret Buckley

Teachta Dála
- In office May 1921 – June 1927
- Constituency: Cork Borough

Personal details
- Born: 27 March 1872 London, England
- Died: 8 March 1942 (aged 69) County Cork, Ireland
- Occupation: Politician; Teacher; Activist

Mary MacSwiney (pronounced 'MacSweeney'; Irish: Máire Nic Shuibhne; 27 March 1872 – 8 March 1942) was an Irish republican activist and politician, as well as a teacher.

MacSwiney was thrust into both the national and international spotlight in 1920 when her brother Terence MacSwiney, then the Lord Mayor of Cork, went on hunger strike in protest of British policy in Ireland. Mary, alongside her sister-in-law Muriel MacSwiney kept daily vigil over Terence and effectively became spokespeople for the campaign. Terence MacSwiney would ultimately die in October 1920, and from then on Mary MacSwiney acted as an unofficial custodian of his legacy, becoming a dogged and zealous advocate of Irish Republicanism.

Following a high-profile seven-month tour of the United States in 1921 in which she and Muriel raised the profile of the Irish independence movement, Mary was elected to Dáil Éireann amidst the ongoing Irish War of Independence. During debates of the Anglo-Irish Treaty, a proposed peace deal between the British and the Irish, MacSwiney was amongst the most outspoken advocates against it. During the ensuing Irish Civil War, MacSwiney supported the Anti-Treaty IRA and was imprisoned for it, resulting in her partaking in two hunger strikes herself.

Following the Sinn Féin/Fianna Fáil split in 1926, she became deputy leader of Sinn Féin in 1927. As Sinn Féin and hardline republicans became increasingly sidelined politically in the decade following the split, MacSwiney reacted by endorsing violence carried out by the IRA. Towards the end of her life, she formally endorsed the World War II era leadership of the IRA under Seán Russell, who would go on to carry out the "S-Plan", a bombing campaign of Northern Ireland and England designed to weaken the UK in the face of Germany.

== Early life ==
Born in London to an Irish father and English mother, she returned to Ireland with her family at the age of six and was educated at St Angela's School in Cork. Her father was a fervent Irish nationalist and imparted those values to all of his children, including Mary.

During her childhood, a severe infection in her leg led to the loss of a foot, which had to be amputated, and delayed her education.

At the age of twenty, she obtained a teaching post at a private school in England. After receiving a loan from the Students' Aid Society in Ireland, she studied for a Teaching Diploma at the University of Cambridge, which was normally reserved for men. She worked at Hillside Convent, Farnborough, and considered becoming a nun, beginning a one-year noviciate with the Oblates of St Benedict, Ventnor.

On the death of her mother in 1904, she returned to Cork to look after the younger members of her family and took a post at St Angela's where she had been a pupil. She attended the first meeting of the Munster Women's Franchise League, becoming a committee member. She opposed militancy within the Irish suffrage movement, and her nationalist views caused irritation to other members.

== Politics ==
=== Entry into Suffragette and Republican politics ===
She attended the first meeting of the Munster Women's Franchise League, becoming a committee member. She opposed militancy within the Irish suffrage movement, and her nationalist views caused irritation to other members.

Influenced by her younger brother Terence MacSwiney's staunch Irish republicanism, she joined the Gaelic League and Inghinidhe na hÉireann.

After her brother Terence and Tomás MacCurtain founded a Cork branch of the Irish Volunteers, Mary in turn founded a Cork branch of Cumann na mBan in 1914, a move which resulted in her leaving the Munster Women's Franchise League. That same year MacSwiney denounced British rule at their general convention in November 1914.

During the Easter Rising of 1916, there was mass confusion in Cork City over whether or not the Volunteers should mobilise, due to conflicting orders. Unsure of what to do, Terence MacSwiney and other volunteers held up in Volunteers Hall in the city, where they were arrested by the British authorities. Mary, who had been running messages for the Volunteers, attempted to return to teaching at St Angela's but she too was arrested later in the week during class. In the aftermath she was dismissed from her teaching position for her republican activities. Several months later, upon her release from prison, she and her sister Annie re-founded Scoil Íte, a sister school to Patrick Pearse's St. Enda's School, a Gaelscoil she would be involved with for the rest of her life.

In 1917 MacSwiney was elected to the national executive of a newly reorganised Cumann na mBan, marking her increasing seniority amongst the women's side of the Republican movement.

=== Death of Terence MacSwiney, becoming a TD ===
Terence MacSwiney died on hunger strike in 1920, protesting British treatment of Irish republicans

In the summer of 1920, a number of imprisoned Irish republicans went on hunger strike, most prominently the now Lord Mayor of Cork Terence MacSwiney. The British government resolved not to cave to the demands of the strikers, fearing that it would contribute towards a widespread revolution in Ireland. Terence began his strike on 12 August and rapidly it became an international cause célèbre, being reported on from all over the world. Terence would ultimately die on 25 October 1920 and would be held up as a martyr by the now-pulsating Irish nationalist movement.

Throughout Terence's strike, both Mary, her sister Annie, and Terence's wife Muriel MacSwiney kept vigil and visited him daily, and were thrust into the roles of republican activists. All of them were deeply traumatised by Terence's death, and were driven into extreme militant Irish republicanism thereafter, Mary perhaps most of all.

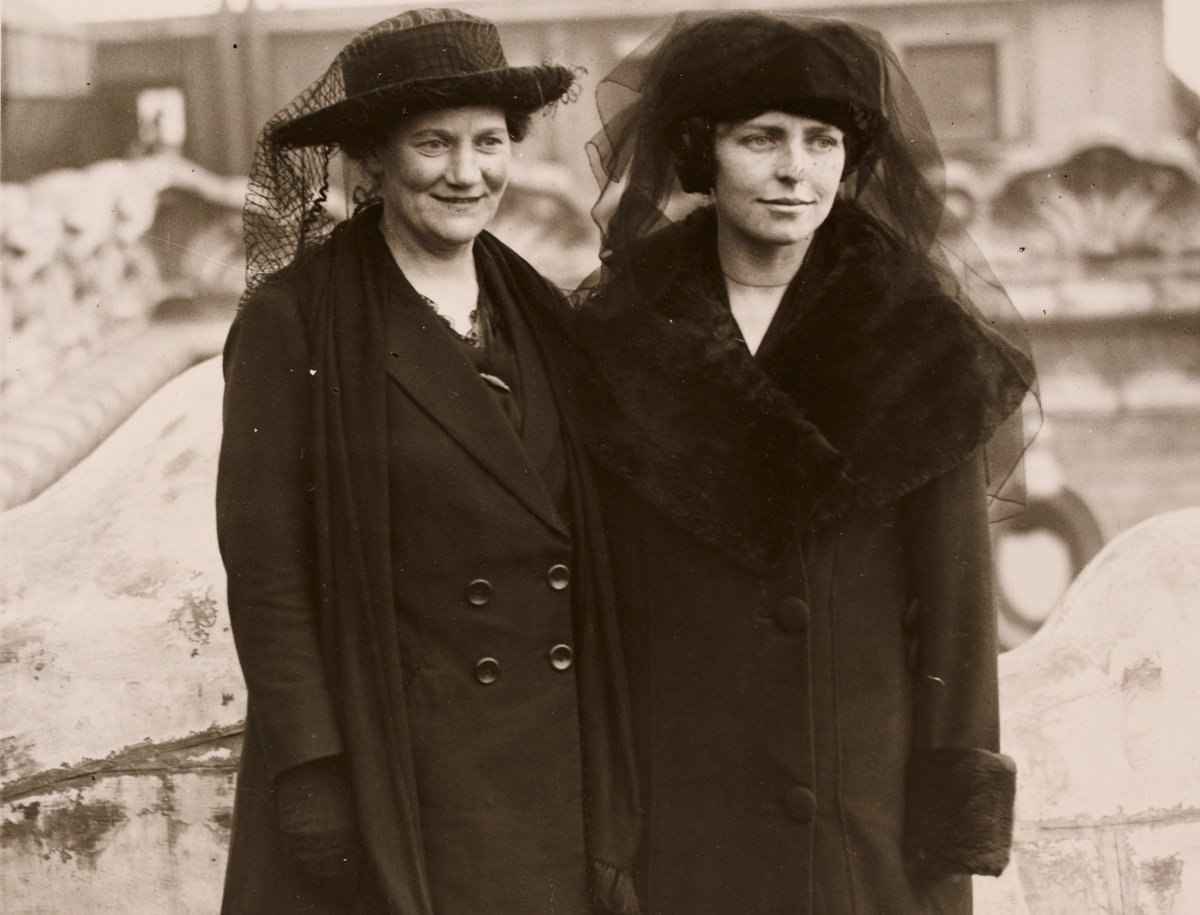
Mary (left) and Muriel MacSwiney while campaigning in the United States in 1920

In the wake of Terance's death, Mary and Muriel MacSwiney embarked on a seven-month tour (1920–1921) of the United States, intended to raise awareness of the Irish cause in America. As part of the tour she gave evidence in Washington, D.C., before the American Commission on Conditions in Ireland. Mary MacSwiney ended up paying a considerable amount of money of her own to cover the costs of the tour.

At the 1921 Irish elections, MacSwiney was elected for Sinn Féin to the Cork Borough constituency (taking her seat in Dáil Éireann), taking the seat that had once been held by her brother. Another brother, Seán, was also elected to the Dáil in a different Cork constituency.

=== Opposition to Anglo-Irish Treaty ===
By the end of 1921, the Irish and British had begun discussing peace terms in London. In October 1921, a second delegation was to be sent to London, that for the first time included Michael Collins. MacSwiney, who remained implacably opposed pleaded with Éamon De Valera to be allowed to go. She was refused as Éamon De Valera thought her "too extreme."

Following the signing of Anglo-Irish Treaty, MacSwiney made clear her utter opposition to it during debates in the Dáil between December 1921 to January 1922, declaring she would prefer to resume the war:

This matter has been put to us as the Treaty or war. I say now if it were war, I would take it gladly and gleefully, not flippantly, but gladly, because I realise that there are evils worse than war, and no physical victory can compensate for a spiritual surrender.

On 21 December MacSwiney spoke for 2 hours and 41 minutes against the treaty, the longest speech by any member during the debates, criticising the agreement from all angles. Her speech was described as being "uncompromisingly Republican" and drew the ire of many of the pro-treaty TDs, Arthur Griffith and Ernest Blythe amongst them. Ultimately, TDs would vote to endorse the treaty by a vote of 64 to 57. The result was devastating to MacSwiney, and in the aftermath, she publicly endorsed threats of violence by the Irish Republican Army against pro-treaty TDs.

=== Irish Civil War and her own hunger strikes ===
Despite the vote in the Dáil to endorse the treaty, matters would not be solved there and would explode into the Irish Civil War, with split the Irish Republican Army into the National Army (Ireland) supporting the newly formed Irish Free State, and the Anti-Treaty IRA who stood against it. MacSwiney backed the Anti-Treaty IRA.

==== November 1922 hunger strike ====
MacSwiney was arrested at Nell Ryan's home (a safe house) in Ballsbridge on 4 November 1922 after it was raided by Free State soldiers. She was taken to Mountjoy Gaol, where she was interned. She immediately went on hunger strike. Cumann na mBan organized vigils outside the prison in protest of Mary's and others' internment. The Women's Prisoner's Defence League was formed in August 1922 to protect their rights. During the hunger strike she refused doctor visits. She was resigned to her death, and the inmates signed a joint 'Message from Mountjoy'. Her condition was critical and she was given the Last Rites by a catholic priest. The Government were not prepared to allow strikers die, and she was released.

==== April 1923 hunger strike ====
En route to Liam Lynch's funeral, she was arrested when the car she was in stopped, and she was recognised. She was taken with Kathleen O'Callaghan to Kilmainham Gaol. She began another protest, fearless of death, being "ready for it". They continued to be interned (held without charge), but it was explained she was distributing anti-government propaganda. After nineteen days of hunger strike she was due to be released on 30 April 1923. The Governor allowed O'Callaghan to go, but stayed a decision on MacSwiney. Most of the women on hunger strike were sent to the North Dublin Union. The 1923 Irish Hunger Strikes saw several thousand of the 12,000 republican prisoners on hunger strikes in Irish prisons/internment camps across Ireland, protesting the continuation of internment without charge/trial, demanding immediate release or status as political prisoners.

She retained her seat at the 1923 general election and along with other Sinn Féin members she refused to enter the Dáil.

=== Vice-President of post-De Valera Sinn Féin ===
In March 1926 Sinn Féin held its annual Ard Fheis, and the topic on the agenda was whether the party should accept the legitimacy of the Dáil and enter it. De Valera had come to believe that abstentionism was not a workable tactic and now saw the need to become the elected government of the Dáil and republicanise the Free State from within. De Valera proposed a motion to accept the Free State Constitution (contingent on the abolition of the Oath of Allegiance), but it was narrowly defeated by a vote of 223 to 218, with MacSwiney amongst those starkly opposed. De Valera immediately resigned from the party and walked out, taking the great majority of Sinn Féin support with him. De Valera and his supporters would go on to immediately form a new Irish republican party, Fianna Fáil. Following the split, MacSwiney became vice-president of what remained of Sinn Féin. She had not foreseen De Valera walking out of the party, believing he would accept the vote against his motion and was greatly bittered when he left, condemning him.

At the June 1927 general election, MacSwiney lost her seat in the Dáil, as did every other remaining Sinn Féin TD, as their place as the primary republican party was completely eclipsed by Fianna Fáil. When a second general election was called that September, Sinn Féin did not have the ability to contest it as they were completely depleted of funds. MacSwiney called for a boycott of the election by the voters, declaring "no true Irish citizen can vote for any of the other parties".

MacSwiney continued her efforts to reinvigorate the party. However, when De Valera's Fianna Fáil won the 1932 election, she felt there was less need for the extreme oppositional position she had previously taken. However, the fragmentation of the rigid republican side continued with the membership also drifting to the left, which MacSwiney opposed. In 1933 MacSwiney resigned from Cumann na mBan, and founded Mná na Poblachta instead. In 1934 she resigned from Sinn Féin when Fr Michael O'Flanagan was elected president since he was a Free State civil servant.

== Renewed support of the IRA and violent action ==
In 1936 the IRA killed 72-year-old retired British vice-admiral Boyle Somerville and an alleged informer John Egan. De Valera unambiguously condemned the killings but MacSwiney equivocated, stating "that if any man was shot by the IRA, he was shot for being a spy". The entire incident pushed MacSwiney into pulling what little support she had been giving to Fianna Fáil and into backing violent militant republicanism. When newly elected IRA Chief-of-Staff Seán Russell reached out to republican former members of the 2nd Dáil to help legitimise his position, MacSwiney responded and supported him. In December 1938 MacSwiney and six others signed over what supposed they had as the "remaining legitimate government of Ireland" to the IRA Army Council. Russell would use this new found authority to "declare war" on England and begin the "S-Plan", a bombing campaign of Northern Ireland and England carried out by the IRA as World War II began.

MacSwiney suffered a heart attack in 1939, which would ultimately contribute towards her death on 8 March 1942 aged 69. De Valera offered to attend, but her sister Annie blankly refused. One contemporary of Mary MacSwiney was the committed supporter of Cumann na mBan Maire Comerford who commented on her friend: "She was one of the finest people I ever knew, straight, incorruptible, kind and just, very brave, soft when it was right to be soft, clear-headed and intelligent."

British Army intelligence file for Mary McSwiney

== Legacy ==
In the mid-2000s, the Blackpool overpass on Dublin Street (N20) in Cork was officially designated as the "Máire MacSwiney Bridge", but the name was not marked until July 2025, when Cork City Council installed a bilingual commemorative sign reading "Droichead Máire Nic Suibhne / Máire MacSwiney Bridge" on the eastern side of the overpass.

== Personal life ==
In 1923, Terence's widow Muriel left Ireland forever, dismayed that the Anti-Treaty IRA has lost the Irish Civil War. She relocated to continental Europe, taking her daughter Máire with her. Máire would grow up primarily in Germany and her communication with the MacSwiney family was severely limited, as Muriel had fallen out with them. However, by the 1930s Máire pined to return to Ireland and made contact with Mary. Mary, for her part, claimed that upon Terence's death, he had placed Máire in both Mary and Muriel's joint custody. Mary journeyed to Switzerland, where she met up with Máire who had run away from boarding school, and together the two returned to Ireland. Because Mary refused to acknowledge the legitimacy of the Irish state, she had no passport, and Éamon De Valera had to see to it that Mary was granted a special one that allowed her to travel.

Upon learning of Máire's return to Ireland, Muriel engaged in a bitter legal battle with Mary that raged in the Irish courts. De Valera's issuing of a passport led Muriel to suggest that Mary and De Valera were conspiring together to kidnap Máire. Ultimately, an Irish judge would rule that Muriel's life in Europe was too chaotic for Máire, and that she should remain in Ireland with her aunt Mary. A distraught Muriel sent Máire one final letter ordering her to return to her side or she would never speak to her again; when Máire did not return, Muriel kept her promise and the two never reconcided despite many attempts from Máire's side.

Máire finished her education in Scoil Íte which MacSwiney had founded and continued to manage and work in as a teacher. Her school, educational advances and feminism were recognised as progressive.

== See also ==
- Families in the Oireachtas

Party political offices
Preceded by P. J. Ruttledge	Vice President of Sinn Féin; With: John Madden	Succeeded by Margaret Buckley

Dáil	Election	Deputy (Party)	Deputy (Party)	Deputy (Party)	Deputy (Party)	Deputy (Party)
2nd	1921	Liam de Róiste (SF)	Mary MacSwiney (SF)	Donal O'Callaghan (SF)	J. J. Walsh (SF)	4 seats 1921–1923
3rd	1922	Liam de Róiste (PT-SF)	Mary MacSwiney (AT-SF)	Robert Day (Lab)	J. J. Walsh (PT-SF)	4 seats 1921–1923
4th	1923	Richard Beamish (Ind.)	Mary MacSwiney (Rep)	Andrew O'Shaughnessy (Ind.)	J. J. Walsh (CnaG)	Alfred O'Rahilly (CnaG)
4th	1924 by-election	Richard Beamish (Ind.)	Mary MacSwiney (Rep)	Andrew O'Shaughnessy (Ind.)	J. J. Walsh (CnaG)	Michael Egan (CnaG)
5th	1927 (Jun)	John Horgan (NL)	Seán French (FF)	Richard Anthony (Lab)	J. J. Walsh (CnaG)	Barry Egan (CnaG)
6th	1927 (Sep)	W. T. Cosgrave (CnaG)	Seán French (FF)	Richard Anthony (Lab)	Hugo Flinn (FF)	Barry Egan (CnaG)
7th	1932	W. T. Cosgrave (CnaG)	Thomas Dowdall (FF)	Richard Anthony (Ind.)	Hugo Flinn (FF)	William Desmond (CnaG)
8th	1933	W. T. Cosgrave (CnaG)	Thomas Dowdall (FF)	Richard Anthony (Ind.)	Hugo Flinn (FF)	William Desmond (CnaG)
9th	1937	W. T. Cosgrave (FG)	Thomas Dowdall (FF)	Richard Anthony (Ind.)	Hugo Flinn (FF)	4 seats 1937–1948
10th	1938	W. T. Cosgrave (FG)	Thomas Dowdall (FF)	James Hickey (Lab)	Hugo Flinn (FF)	4 seats 1937–1948
11th	1943	W. T. Cosgrave (FG)	Frank Daly (FF)	Richard Anthony (Ind.)	Séamus Fitzgerald (FF)	4 seats 1937–1948
12th	1944	William Dwyer (Ind.)	Frank Daly (FF)	Richard Anthony (Ind.)	Walter Furlong (FF)	4 seats 1937–1948
12th	1946 by-election	Patrick McGrath (FF)	Frank Daly (FF)	Richard Anthony (Ind.)	Walter Furlong (FF)	4 seats 1937–1948
13th	1948	Patrick McGrath (FF)	Michael Sheehan (Ind.)	James Hickey (NLP)	Jack Lynch (FF)	Thomas F. O'Higgins (FG)
14th	1951	Patrick McGrath (FF)	Seán McCarthy (FF)	James Hickey (Lab)	Jack Lynch (FF)	Thomas F. O'Higgins (FG)
14th	1954 by-election	Patrick McGrath (FF)	Seán McCarthy (FF)	James Hickey (Lab)	Jack Lynch (FF)	Stephen Barrett (FG)
15th	1954	Patrick McGrath (FF)	Anthony Barry (FG)	Seán Casey (Lab)	Jack Lynch (FF)	Stephen Barrett (FG)
15th	1956 by-election	John Galvin (FF)	Anthony Barry (FG)	Seán Casey (Lab)	Jack Lynch (FF)	Stephen Barrett (FG)
16th	1957	John Galvin (FF)	Gus Healy (FF)	Seán Casey (Lab)	Jack Lynch (FF)	Stephen Barrett (FG)
17th	1961	John Galvin (FF)	Anthony Barry (FG)	Seán Casey (Lab)	Jack Lynch (FF)	Stephen Barrett (FG)
17th	1964 by-election	Sheila Galvin (FF)	Anthony Barry (FG)	Seán Casey (Lab)	Jack Lynch (FF)	Stephen Barrett (FG)
18th	1965	Gus Healy (FF)	Pearse Wyse (FF)	Seán Casey (Lab)	Jack Lynch (FF)	Stephen Barrett (FG)
18th	1967 by-election	Gus Healy (FF)	Pearse Wyse (FF)	Seán French (FF)	Jack Lynch (FF)	Stephen Barrett (FG)
19th	1969	Constituency abolished. See Cork City North-West and Cork City South-East				
