= Muriel MacSwiney =

Irish republican and left-wing activist

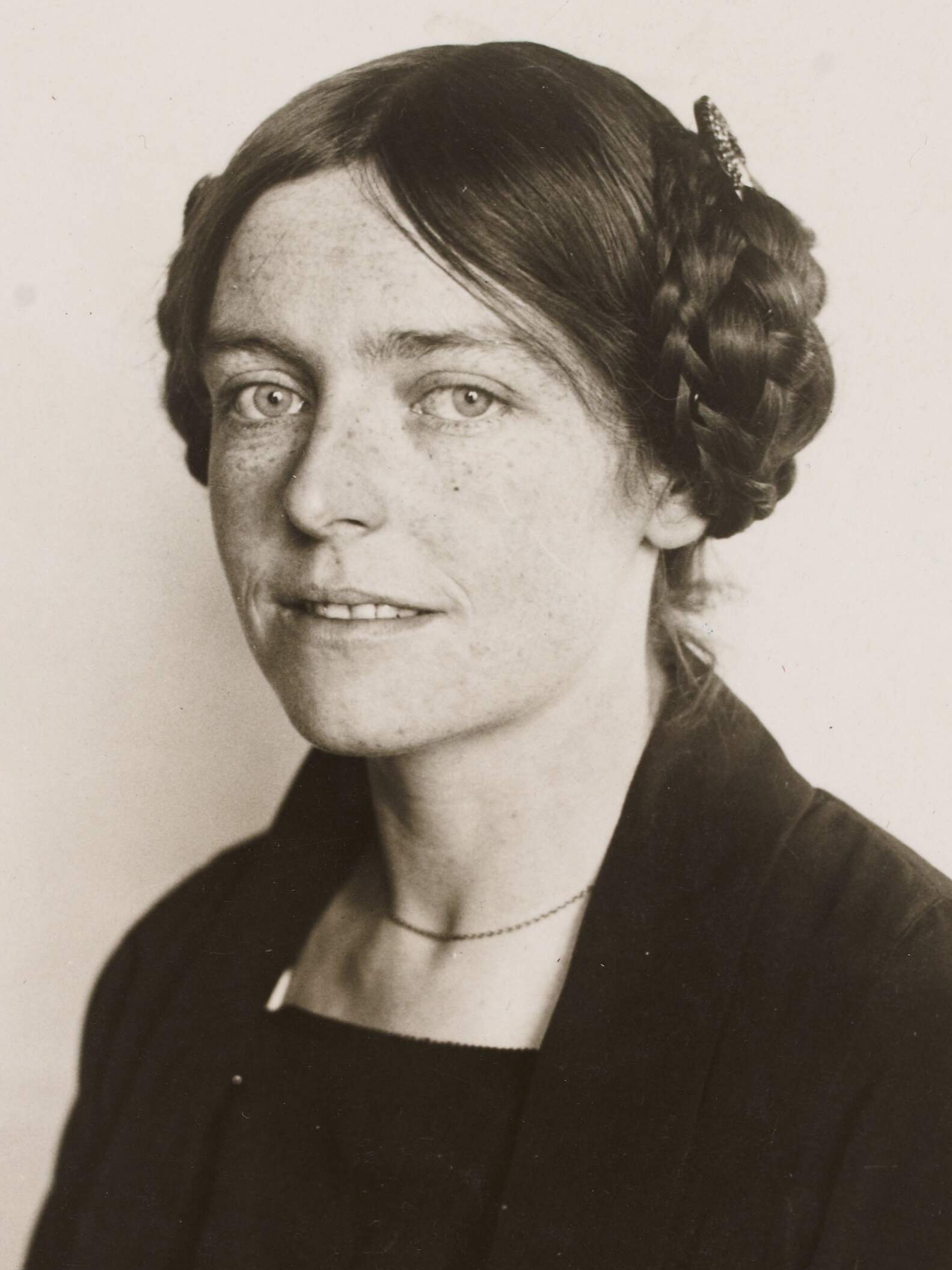
- MacSwiney in 1920
- Born: Muriel Frances Murphy; 8 June 1892; Cork, Ireland
- Died: 26 October 1982 (aged 90); Maidstone, United Kingdom
- Spouse: Terence MacSwiney
- Children: Máire MacSwiney Brugha

Muriel MacSwiney (née Murphy, 8 June 1892 – 26 October 1982) was an Irish republican and left-wing activist, and the first woman to be given the Freedom of New York City. She was the wife of Terence MacSwiney, mother of Máire MacSwiney Brugha and sister-in-law of Mary MacSwiney. The 1920 hunger strike of her husband Terence became an international cause célèbre, and following his death she became one of the most high profile Irish republican activists in the world, widely campaigning in the United States throughout the early 1920s. Following the defeat of the Anti-Treaty IRA in the Irish Civil War in 1923, Muriel never again lived in Ireland and instead embarked upon a bohemian life on the European continent. However, this led to a falling out with her daughter Máire, resulting in a bitter custody battle when Máire attempted to return to Ireland and ultimately total estrangement after 1934. MacSwiney spent most of the 1930s in Paris, France and from 1940 onwards lived in England, where she still occasionally involved herself in left-wing and republican causes.

== Early life ==
Muriel Frances Murphy was born on 8 June 1892 to a wealthy Cork family. Her father was Nicholas Murphy and her mother Mary Gertrude Purcell of Carrigmore, in Montenotte, Cork city. MacSwiney was sent away to school, to a convent in Sussex. As an adult she came to despise the privilege of her upbringing, remarking that her family was "completely imperialist, conservative, capitalist, and Roman Catholic".

== Political activism and marriage to Terence MacSwiney ==
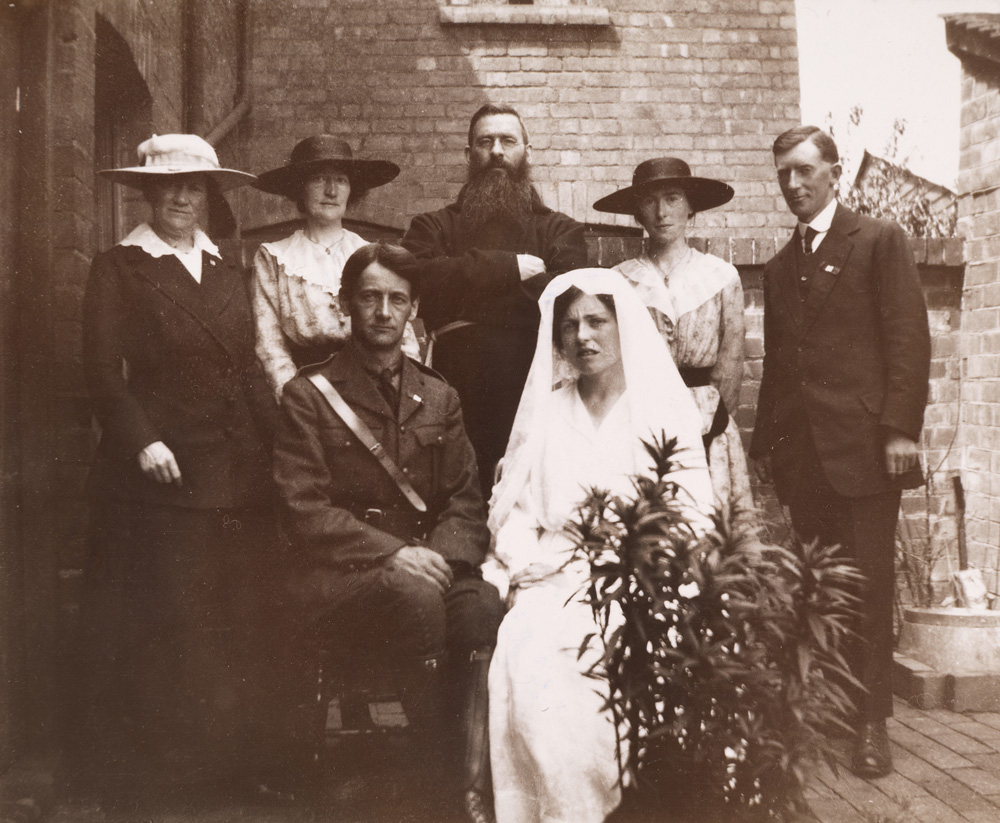
The MacSwineys on their wedding day. The best man Richard Mulcahy can be seen on the right.

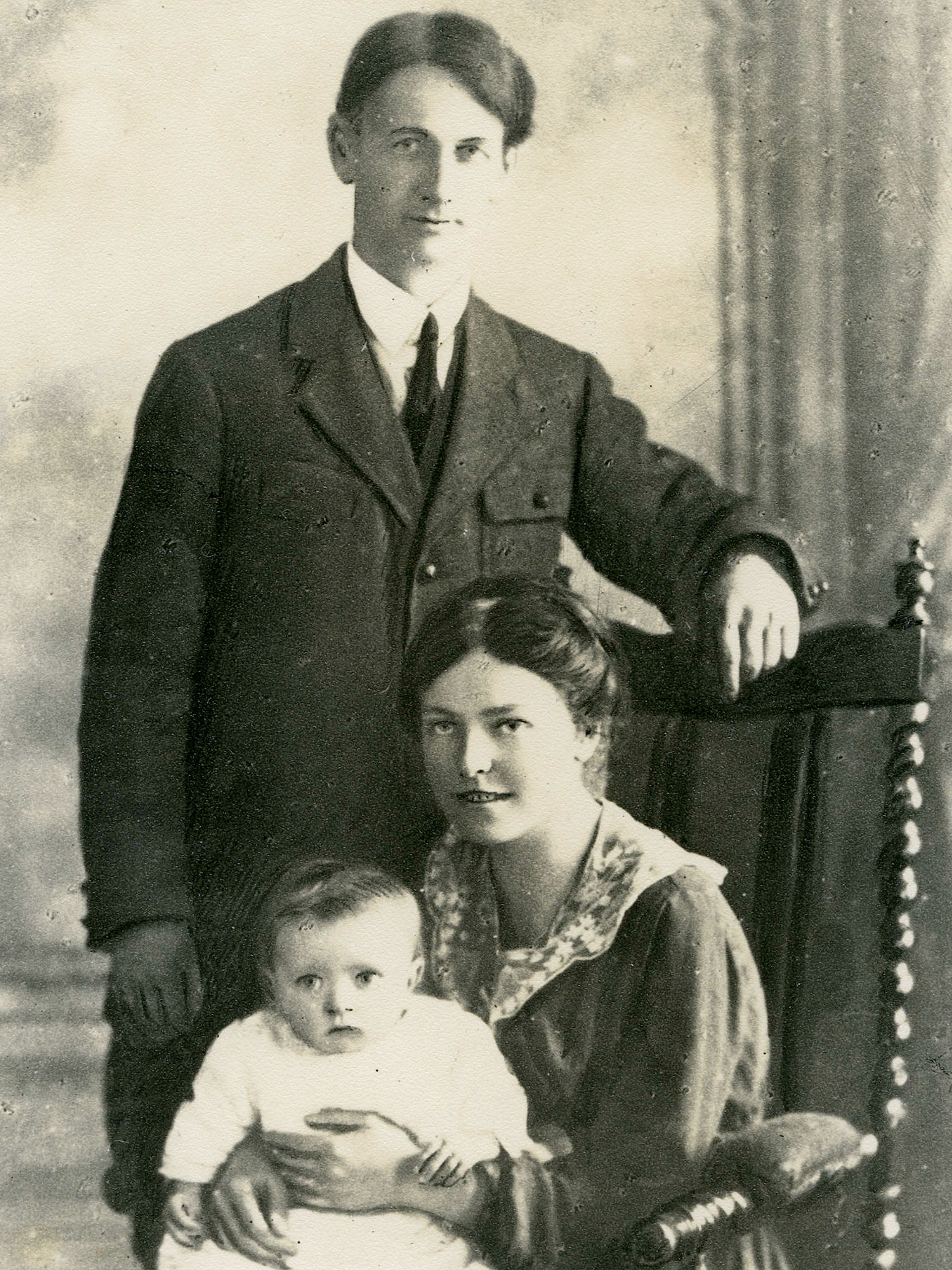
Terence, Muriel and daughter Máire in circa May 1919

By 1915 she had become interested and involved in the Irish nationalist movement, and joined both the Gaelic League and Cumann na mBan. It was as part of these organisations she met and befriended the sisters of Terence MacSwiney. Murphy witnessed MacSwiney give a public speech at a Manchester Martyrs meeting, but didn't meet him personally until Christmas 1915 when she attended an evening at the Fleischmann. From there they began seeing each other, and during the Easter Rising of 1916, Murphy brought MacSwiney food and information to Volunteer Hall in Cork, where MacSwiney was held up with other members of the Irish Volunteers, confused about whether they should mobilise or not. Their relationship continued to develop in the aftermath of the Rising and the two communicated by letter while MacSwiney was imprisoned. Murphy's family was horrified by the courtship and discouraged it every step of the way, nevertheless, after MacSwiney was deported to England immediately after his release from prison, Murphy joined him there. The two married on 9 June 1917 in Bromyard, England one day after Murphy's 25th birthday, and one day after she was eligible for her inheritance, ensuring the independence of the couple from the Murphy family. Her bridesmaid was Geraldine O’Sullivan (Neeson) while his best man was Richard Mulcahy.

In the summer of 1917 the couple moved several times before settling on Douglas Road, Cork. In November Terence was imprisoned again, and briefly went on hunger strike, which Muriel (by this point pregnant) objected to. She wrote privately that she "did not approve of hunger strike although entirely for the cause". Throughout the rest of 1917 and 1918 Terence would be released only to be almost immediately reimprisoned, with Muriel following him to prisons in Dundalk and Belfast. She returned to Cork in June 1918 to give birth to their daughter, Máire MacSwiney Brugha, but by August brought Máire with her to visit Terence in a Belfast prison.

=== Terence MacSwiney's final hunger strike ===
MacSwiney's daily life remained held in this pattern until Terence's final hunger strike, which he began in the summer of 1920. Terence had become Lord Mayor of Cork in March 1920 and he began the highest-profile member of the 1920 Cork hunger strike, which became an internationally known news event. Although offering Terence daily support, MacSwiney also petitioned the newly emergent Irish Republican Army to call Terence off the strike. Although Muriel later claimed publicly to have fully supported the strike, her private fears about it caused her to conflict with her sister-in-law Mary MacSwiney, a fellow activist who urged Terence to see out the strike. Terence died due to his hunger strike on 25 October 1920. In the aftermath, Muriel was the only member of Terence's family to attend a British-run inquest into his death, which caused more infighting. Muriel was physically unable to return to Ireland for the funeral, which was attended by 10,000s of mourners.

== Continued activism ==
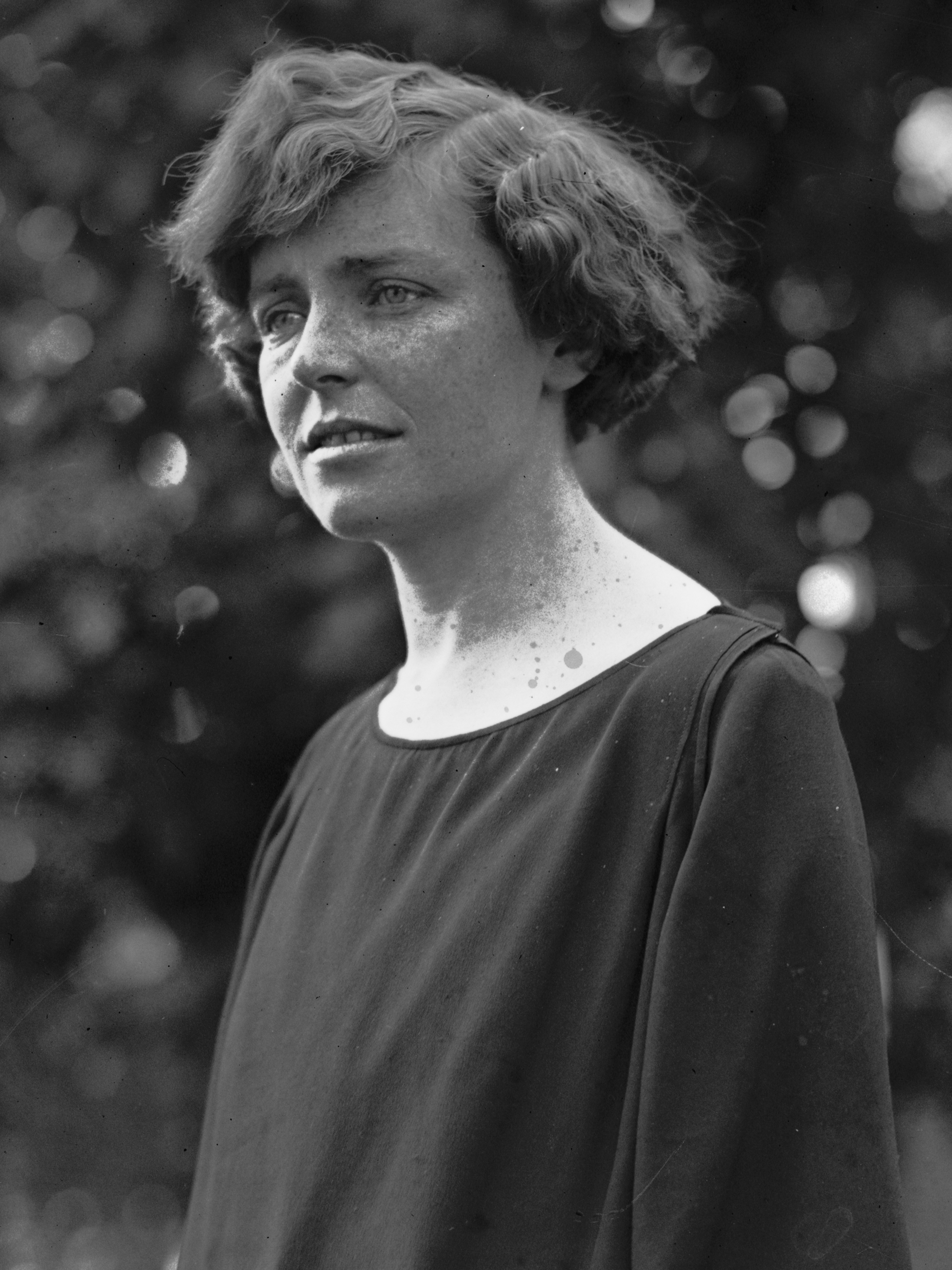
A photographic portrait of MacSwiney taken in 1922

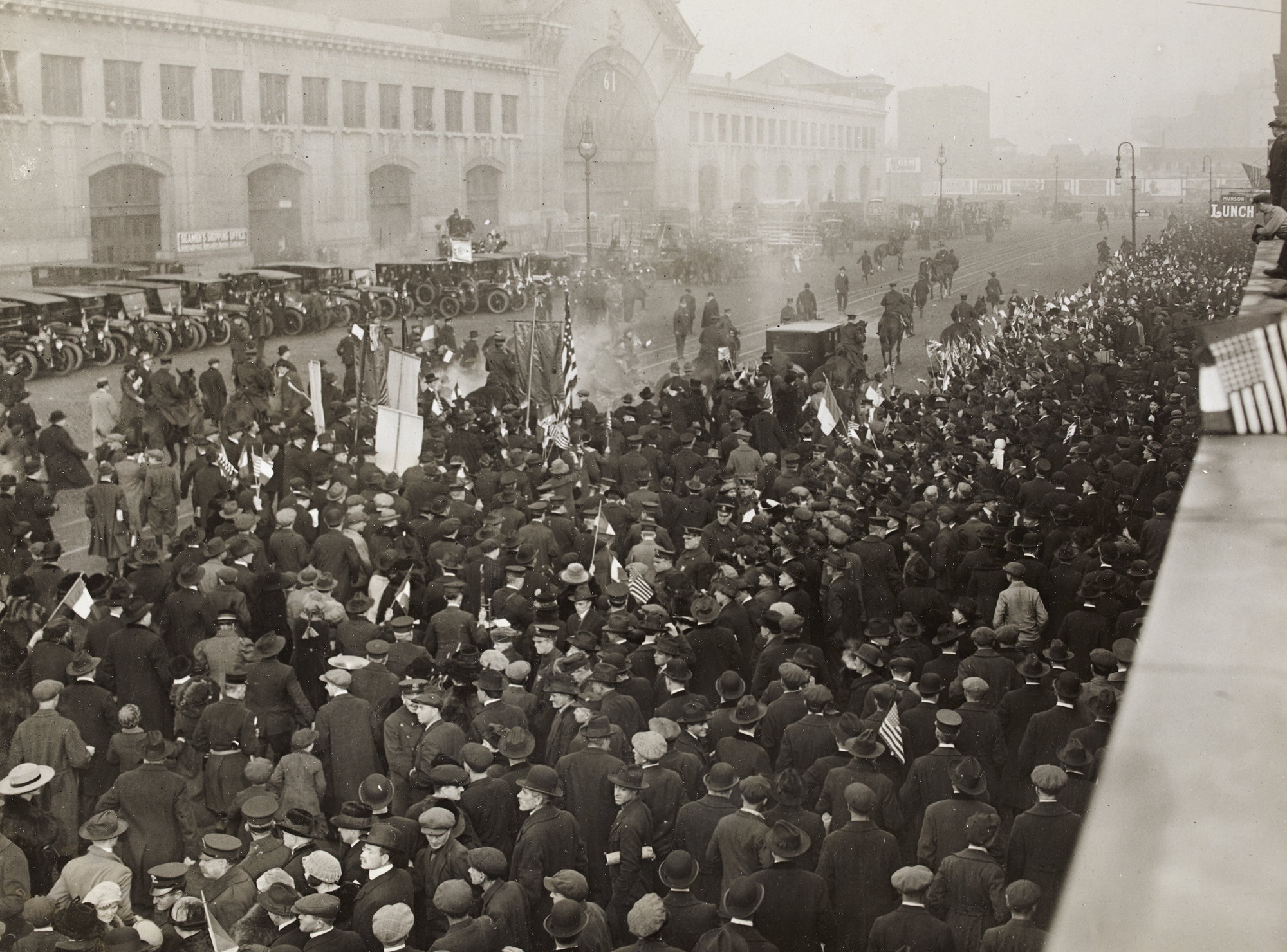
MacSwiney being welcomed to the United States in 1922 by crowds in New York City

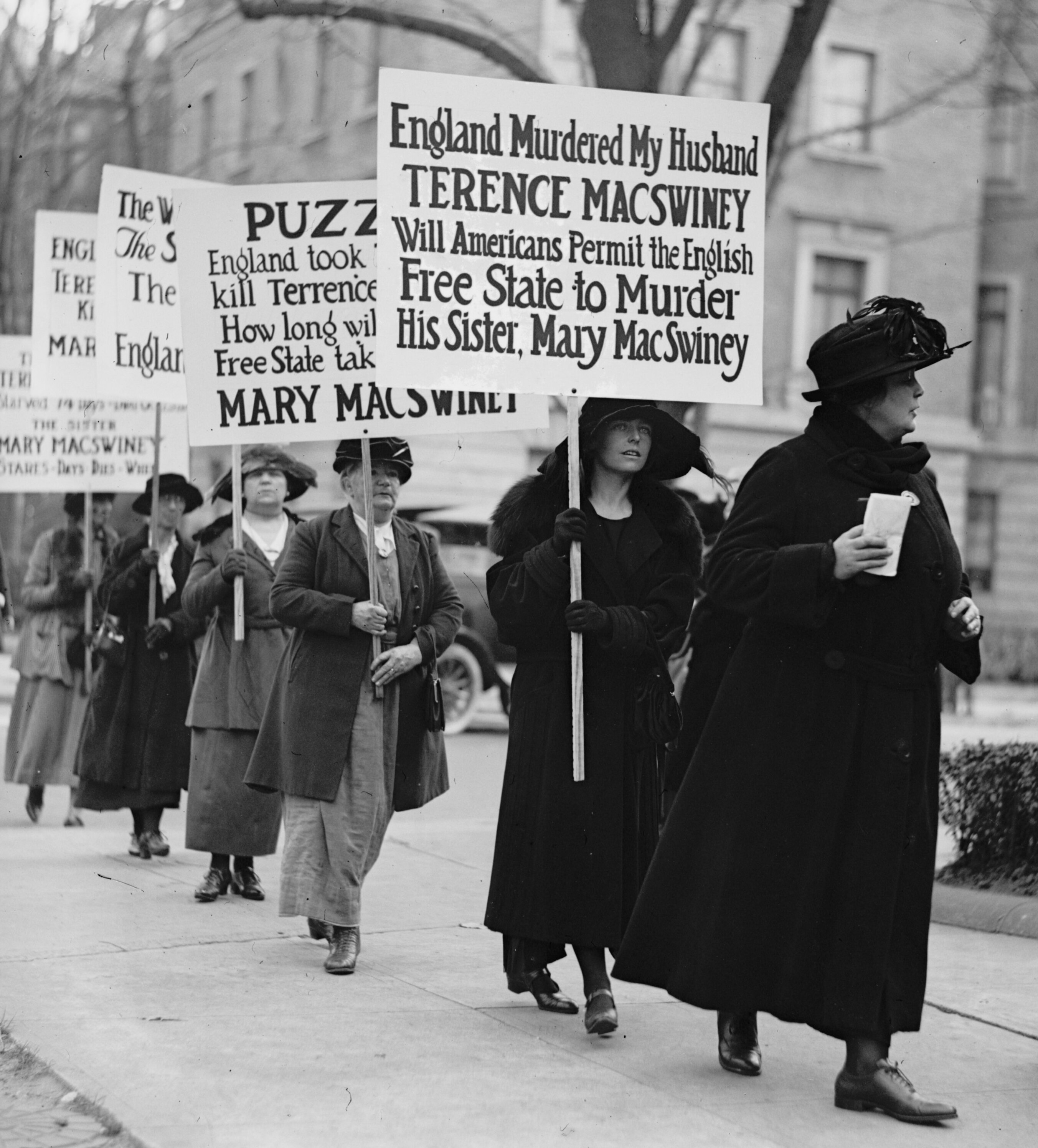
MacSwiney leading protests in America that same year

The death of MacSwiney's husband dealt a huge impact on her life, being a public event as well as a personal loss. MacSwiney was catapulted into the spotlight as the mourning widow of someone the Irish nationalist movement was now holding up as a martyr. In this capacity MacSwiney travelled to the United States to attend the "Commission on conditions in Ireland" of 1921, which was being held in Washington DC. Along the way, MacSwiney headed a delegation of widows Irish women, including Mary MacSwiney, who visited major cities such as New York and Boston en route, where they delivered speeches at public meetings intended to rally Irish Americans to the cause. The American tour ended up lasting nine months total and was a major success in swaying both the view of the American public and American politicians towards the Irish, and saw Muriel becoming the first woman in history to receive the Freedom of New York City in 1922.

MacSwiney returned, exhausted, to Ireland in January 1922, just after the signing of the Anglo-Irish Treaty in December 1921. MacSwiney took the anti-treaty position; a letter expressing her opposition to it was read in the Dáil by William Stockley and in June 1922 was part of the garrison in the Hammam hotel led by Cathal Brugha. It was also during this period that MacSwiney was part of a group posing as a Red Cross delegation who broke Annie M. P. Smithson from Mullingar prison with the help of Linda Kearns MacWhinney.

In the aftermath, MacSwiney was briefly arrested. Thereafter, MacSwiney and Kearns departed for America, where once again MacSwiney embarked on a political tour, this time trying to build support for the anti-treaty side. She left her daughter Máire in the care of the family of the O'Rahilly. While campaigning in the States, different Irish-American factions squabbled for her support, but nevertheless MacSwiney struggled to raise support for the anti-treaty side. While in New York City, MacSwiney and Robert Briscoe broke into and occupied the Irish consular offices and had to be removed by police. It was during this time period she also campaigned for the release from prison of the Irish Communist Jim Larkin, who had been sentenced to 5 to 10 years for "Criminal Anarchy" in 1919 and imprisoned in New York's Sing Sing.

== Later life ==
MacSwiney returned to Ireland in the summer of 1923; by that point, the Irish Civil War was fizzling to an end in a decisive defeat for the Anti-Treaty IRA. MacSwiney publicly declared herself an atheist and began supporting, and eventually joining, Jim Larkin's Irish Worker League. (Note: Larkin had returned to Ireland following the granting of a pardon, aided by the Irish-American mayor of New York, Al Smith.) This did not improve her relations with her conservative sister-in-law Mary, who began to claim that on Terence's deathbed, he had placed his daughter Máire in the joint custody of both Muriel and Mary, rather than solely to Muriel. In response, Muriel took Máire and left for Germany.

For the next several years, amid what appeared to be long-term depression, MacSwiney travelled between Germany, Switzerland and France, while Máire attended boarding schools in Germany. MacSwiney continued to be sporadically involved in left-wing causes and married a German left-wing activist with the surname Pullman, which led to the birth of a second daughter, Alix, in 1926. Pullman was later killed during the Nazi Germany period.

=== Estrangement from Máire ===
In 1932 Máire MacSwiney attempted to return to Ireland alongside her aunt Mary. Because Mary refused to acknowledge the legitimacy of the Irish Free State, she had to be issued a special passport by the newly elected leader of the country, the republican Éamon de Valera. In turn, this led Muriel to believe that de Valera had conspired with Mary to kidnap Máire. Máire, however, for her part, always refused the idea that she had been kidnapped, instead claiming that she felt her life with her mother on the continent was too chaotic and unstable. What followed was a bitter custody battle over Máire, in which the court ultimately ruled in favour of Mary. Muriel blamed the influence of the Catholic Church for the decision, although the Judge did seem to seriously consider Máire wishes and also the apparent uncertainty of Muriel's lifestyle. When an adult Máire refused to return to her mother's side in Switzerland in 1934, the relationship between the two was permanently severed and Muriel never spoke to Máire again, despite several attempts by Maire and her husband Ruairi Brugha over the years.

=== Life in France and England ===
For the duration of the 1930s, MacSwiney lived in Paris, France, where she continued to be engaged with politics, typically those of left-wing, including communist, groups. She was particularly active in the Ligue de l'enseignement, a non-sectarian teachers' union that she recruited Owen Sheehy Skeffington, an Irish socialist who was living in Paris at the time, into. While living in France she was romantically involved with the Communist Pierre Kaan. Kaan, a member of the French resistance during World War II, was sent to a concentration camp by the Gestapo and died on 18 May 1945 as a result of his treatment there.

MacSwiney evacuated France for England in 1940 upon the onset of the Battle for France, and she began working in a hospital in Oxford. Later, living in London, she became associated with the Irish-British Connolly Association, however, by 1956 she fell out with its primary leader C. Desmond Greaves and left.

By 1950 MacSwiney's entire inheritance had been spent, however, she was able to successfully apply for a widow's pension, to the sum of £500 a year, from the Irish state on account of her marriage to Terence. In 1957 she objected to the creation of a chapel in honour of Terence MacSwiney in St George's cathedral, Southwark, England. MacSwiney argued any memorial to Terence should be built in Ireland, on a non-sectarian bias, and that it should serve the poor.

As late as the 1970s, MacSwiney remained politically engaged: She was critical of American foreign policy on Vietnam, calling the USA a "world imperialist power". In 1972, she spoke publicly at a meeting of the Workers’ Association for the Democratic Settlement of the National Conflict in Ireland.

MacSwiney never resolved her relationships with either Máire or the rest of her family. MacSwiney was living in Tonbridge in Kent with her daughter Alix near the end of her life. She died on 26 October 1982 at Oakwood Hospital, Maidstone.
