= Acció =

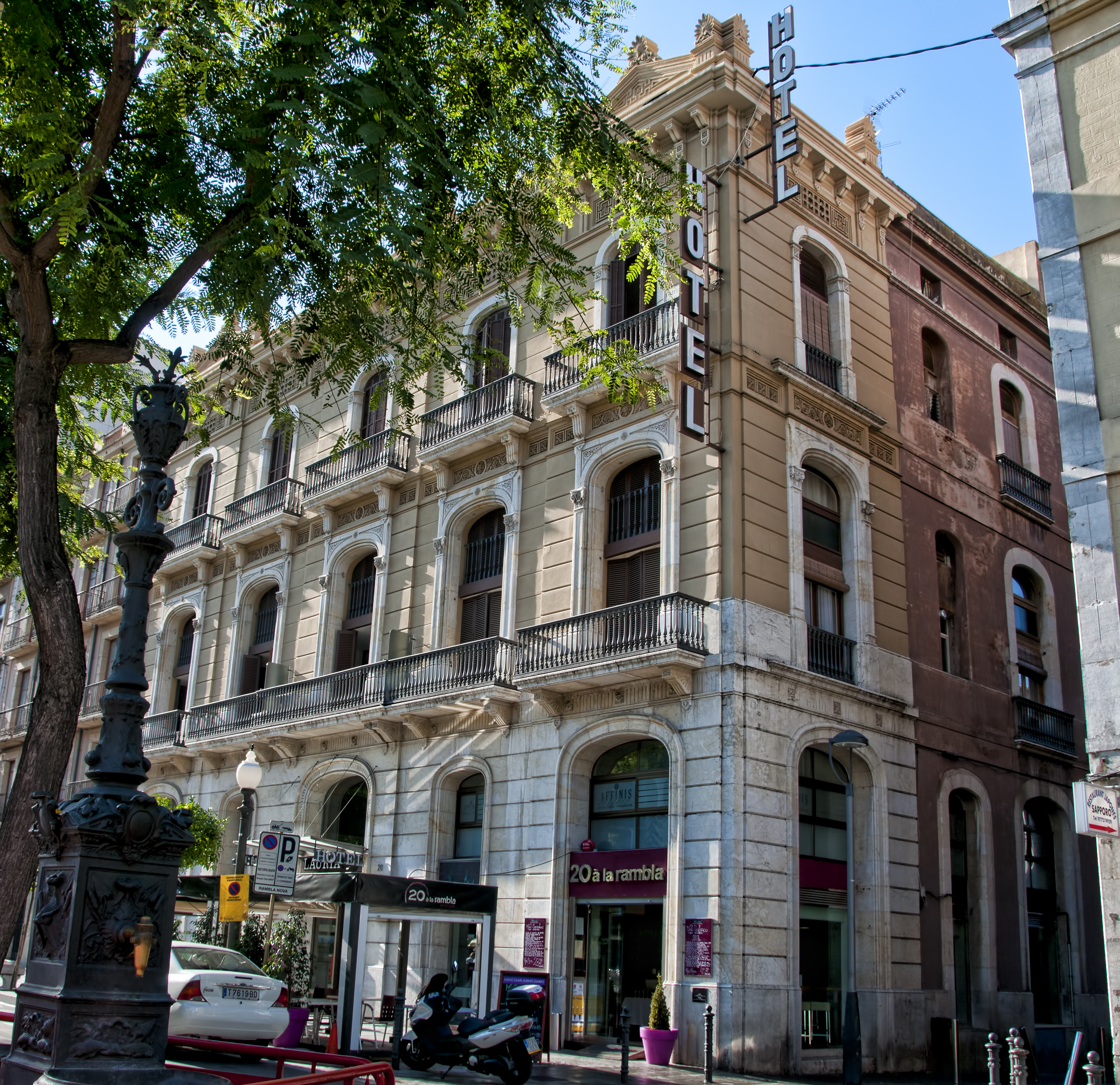
- Casa Rosell, which hosted the Acció and POUM offices, currently a hotel
- Type: Weekly
- Publisher: Iberian Communist Youth
- Founded: 1 October 1936
- Ceased publication: 1937
- Political alignment: Marxism
- Language: Catalan language, Spanish language
- Headquarters: Tarragona
- OCLC number: 781772762

Acció ('Action') was a weekly newspaper published from Tarragona, Spain 1936–1937. It was the local organ of the Iberian Communist Youth (JCI), the youth wing of POUM. The first issue was published on 1 October 1936. Ricard Garriga Salvadó was the director of Acció. When Garriga was sent to the front, Josep Vilar took over as director of the newspaper. The offices of the newspaper were located inside the POUM-JCI office in downtown Tarragona (Casa Rosell, which had hosted the CEDA office before the war), at Rambla 14 Abril on the corner with Carrer de Girona. The newspaper was printed at Suc de Torres & Virgili.

Acció was a bilingual publication. The issues of Acció carried four pages. The format was 503 x 350 mm. It was sold at 15 céntimos per issue.

Acció disappeared after the events of May 1937.
