= Caitlín Brugha =

Irish politician (1879–1959)

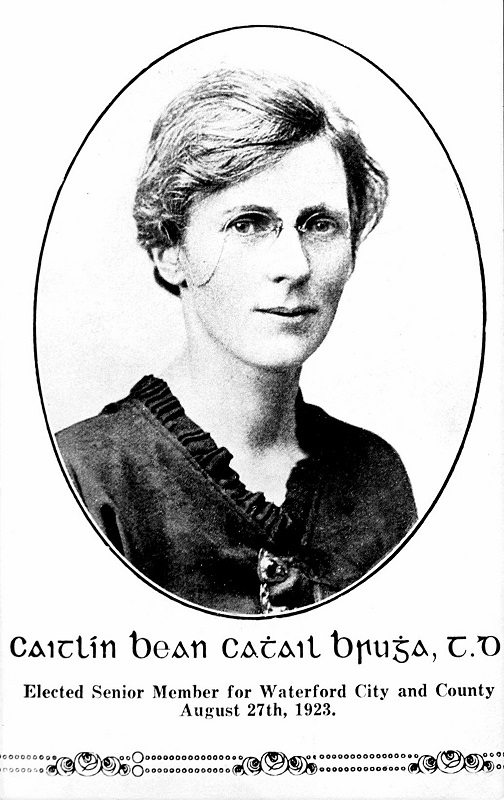
- Brugha in 1923

Teachta Dála
- In office August 1923 – June 1927
- Constituency: Waterford

Personal details
- Born: Kathleen Kingston; 11 December 1879 Parsonstown, Ireland
- Died: 1 December 1959 (aged 79) Dublin, Ireland
- Party: Sinn Féin
- Spouse: Cathal Brugha (m. 1912)
- Children: 6, including Ruairí

Caitlín Brugha ([ˈkatʲlʲiːnʲˈbˠɾˠuː] KOT-leen BROO; née Kathleen Kingston; 11 December 1879 – 1 December 1959) was an Irish Sinn Féin politician who served as a Teachta Dála (TD) for the Waterford constituency from 1923 to 1927.

== Early life ==
Kingston was born in Parsonstown, King's County (modern Birr) to William Kingston, a shopkeeper, and Catherine (née Roche). She attended the Convent of the Sacred Heart in Roscrea. Her family later moved to Dublin when she was 31 and she continued the activism she had been part of through the Gaelic League when she got there.

She married Irish revolutionary Cathal Brugha, head of a candle manufacture company, in 1912. Because of the family activities and involvement in the Irish War of Independence, they moved several times, to the Waterford Gaeltacht and Ballybunion in Kerry. In the aftermath of the Truce the family was able to return to Dublin.

== Politics ==
Cathal Brugha died in battle on 7 July 1922 in the first days of the Irish Civil War, having taken the Republican side opposing the Anglo-Irish Treaty. His death left her widowed with six children under the age of 10. She ran in the same constituency that her husband represented and was elected to Dáil Éireann as a Sinn Féin TD at the 1923 general election for the Waterford constituency. In accordance with Sinn Féin policy of the time she did not take her seat in Dáil Éireann. She stayed with the abstentionists of Sinn Féin when Éamon de Valera left to found Fianna Fáil in 1926.

She was re-elected at the June 1927 general election. Sinn Féin was unable to raise the funds to contest the second election called that year, and Brugha did not contest the September 1927 general election. Brugha successfully campaigned on the welfare of Republican prisoners.

== Later life ==
She established a drapery business, Kingston's Ltd, in 1924 and following her exit from politics devoted much time to the venture.

Her continuing anti-Britishness was evidenced when, in 1941, she was accused of harbouring German spy Günther Schütz, who had parachuted into Wexford.

Her son, Ruairí Brugha, became a Fianna Fáil politician and was elected to Dáil Éireann at the 1973 general election.

== See also ==
- Families in the Oireachtas

Dáil	Election	Deputy (Party)	Deputy (Party)	Deputy (Party)	Deputy (Party)
4th	1923	Caitlín Brugha (Rep)	John Butler (Lab)	Nicholas Wall (FP)	William Redmond (NL)
5th	1927 (Jun)	Caitlín Brugha (Rep)	Patrick Little (FF)	Vincent White (CnaG)	William Redmond (NL)
6th	1927 (Sep)	Seán Goulding (FF)	Patrick Little (FF)	Vincent White (CnaG)	William Redmond (NL)
7th	1932	Seán Goulding (FF)	Patrick Little (FF)	John Kiersey (CnaG)	William Redmond (CnaG)
8th	1933	Seán Goulding (FF)	Patrick Little (FF)	Nicholas Wall (NCP)	Bridget Redmond (CnaG)
9th	1937	Michael Morrissey (FF)	Patrick Little (FF)	Nicholas Wall (FG)	Bridget Redmond (FG)
10th	1938	Michael Morrissey (FF)	Patrick Little (FF)	William Broderick (FG)	Bridget Redmond (FG)
11th	1943	Michael Morrissey (FF)	Patrick Little (FF)	Denis Heskin (CnaT)	Bridget Redmond (FG)
12th	1944	Michael Morrissey (FF)	Patrick Little (FF)	Denis Heskin (CnaT)	Bridget Redmond (FG)
12th	1947 by-election	John Ormonde (FF)	Patrick Little (FF)	Denis Heskin (CnaT)	Bridget Redmond (FG)
13th	1948	John Ormonde (FF)	Patrick Little (FF)	Thomas Kyne (Lab)	Bridget Redmond (FG)
14th	1951	John Ormonde (FF)	Patrick Little (FF)	Thomas Kyne (Lab)	Bridget Redmond (FG)
14th	1952 by-election	John Ormonde (FF)	Patrick Little (FF)	Thomas Kyne (Lab)	William Kenneally (FF)
15th	1954	John Ormonde (FF)	Thaddeus Lynch (FG)	Thomas Kyne (Lab)	William Kenneally (FF)
16th	1957	John Ormonde (FF)	Thaddeus Lynch (FG)	Thomas Kyne (Lab)	William Kenneally (FF)
17th	1961	John Ormonde (FF)	Thaddeus Lynch (FG)	Thomas Kyne (Lab)	3 seats 1961–1977
18th	1965	Billy Kenneally (FF)	Thaddeus Lynch (FG)	Thomas Kyne (Lab)	3 seats 1961–1977
18th	1966 by-election	Billy Kenneally (FF)	Fad Browne (FF)	Thomas Kyne (Lab)	3 seats 1961–1977
19th	1969	Billy Kenneally (FF)	Fad Browne (FF)	Edward Collins (FG)	3 seats 1961–1977
20th	1973	Billy Kenneally (FF)	Thomas Kyne (Lab)	Edward Collins (FG)	3 seats 1961–1977
21st	1977	Billy Kenneally (FF)	Jackie Fahey (FF)	Edward Collins (FG)	Austin Deasy (FG)
22nd	1981	Billy Kenneally (FF)	Jackie Fahey (FF)	Edward Collins (FG)	Austin Deasy (FG)
23rd	1982 (Feb)	Paddy Gallagher (SF–WP)	Jackie Fahey (FF)	Edward Collins (FG)	Austin Deasy (FG)
24th	1982 (Nov)	Donal Ormonde (FF)	Jackie Fahey (FF)	Edward Collins (FG)	Austin Deasy (FG)
25th	1987	Martin Cullen (PDs)	Jackie Fahey (FF)	Brian Swift (FF)	Austin Deasy (FG)
26th	1989	Brian O'Shea (Lab)	Jackie Fahey (FF)	Brendan Kenneally (FF)	Austin Deasy (FG)
27th	1992	Brian O'Shea (Lab)	Martin Cullen (PDs)	Brendan Kenneally (FF)	Austin Deasy (FG)
28th	1997	Brian O'Shea (Lab)	Martin Cullen (FF)	Brendan Kenneally (FF)	Austin Deasy (FG)
29th	2002	Brian O'Shea (Lab)	Martin Cullen (FF)	Ollie Wilkinson (FF)	John Deasy (FG)
30th	2007	Brian O'Shea (Lab)	Martin Cullen (FF)	Brendan Kenneally (FF)	John Deasy (FG)
31st	2011	Ciara Conway (Lab)	John Halligan (Ind.)	Paudie Coffey (FG)	John Deasy (FG)
32nd	2016	David Cullinane (SF)	John Halligan (Ind.)	Mary Butler (FF)	John Deasy (FG)
33rd	2020	David Cullinane (SF)	Marc Ó Cathasaigh (GP)	Mary Butler (FF)	Matt Shanahan (Ind.)
34th	2024	David Cullinane (SF)	Conor D. McGuinness (SF)	Mary Butler (FF)	John Cummins (FG)
