= Tomás Mac Curtain =

Irish revolutionary and Cork Lord Mayor (1884–1920)

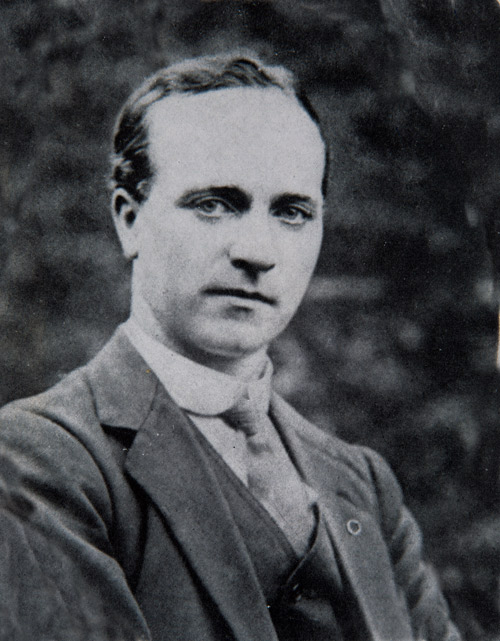
- Born: 20 March 1884; Mourne Abbey, Ireland
- Died: 20 March 1920 (aged 36); Cork, Ireland
- Occupation: Lord Mayor of Cork
- Known for: Sinn Féin Lord Mayor of Cork (assassinated)
- Military career
- Allegiance: Irish Republic
- Service: Irish Volunteers; Irish Republican Army
- Service years: 1913–1920
- Rank: Commandant
- Commands: Commander, Cork Brigade, Irish Volunteers; Commander, No.1 Cork Brigade, IRA
- Conflicts: Easter Rising; Irish War of Independence

Tomás Mac Curtain (20 March 1884 – 20 March 1920) was an Irish republican and Sinn Féin politician. He was active with the Irish Republican Brotherhood and Irish Volunteers, and led the Volunteers during the Easter Rising in Cork. He was also elected and served as the Lord Mayor of Cork until his assassination by the Royal Irish Constabulary in 1920.

== Background ==
Tomás Mac Curtain was born at Ballyknockane, Mourne Abbey, County Cork, on 20 March 1884, the son of Patrick Curtin, a farmer, and Julia Sheehan. He attended Burnfort National School. In 1897 the family moved to Cork City, where he attended the North Monastery School.

Mac Curtain, as he would later be known, was active in a number of cultural and political movements beginning around the turn of the 20th century. He joined the Blackpool, Cork branch of Conradh na Gaeilge (the Gaelic League), becoming its secretary in 1902. He had interests in music, poetry, history, archaeology and Irish history. He worked as a clerk in his early career and taught Irish in his free time.

He met Elizabeth Walsh (Eibhlís Breathnach) at a Gaelic League meeting and they married on 28 June 1908. They had six children, five of whom survived into adulthood. The family lived over 40 Thomas Davis Street, where Mac Curtain ran a small clothing and rainwear factory.

== Revolutionary career ==
Mac Curtain joined the Irish Republican Brotherhood in 1906, Sinn Féin in 1907, Fianna Éireann in 1911, and the Irish Volunteers in 1913. He remained with the Volunteers after the split, becoming the Commandant of the 1st (Cork City) Battalion and later commander of the Cork Brigade.

On Easter Sunday 1916, over 1,000 men of the Cork Brigade of the Irish Volunteers mobilised and took up their assigned positions across Cork City and County. After multiple contradictory orders including MacNeill's countermanding order, later that evening Mac Curtain decided that he and his deputy Terence MacSwiney would travel across rural Cork to stand down his men. By the time he arrived back in Volunteer Headquarters on Sheares Street late on Easter Monday, he heard that the Rising had been in progress in Dublin for several hours. With only the city Volunteers available and British forces alerted, the Volunteers barricaded themselves into their headquarters.

A tense stand-off ensued as British forces surrounded the Volunteer's hall. After a few days, the Lord Mayor of Cork, Thomas C Butterfield, and Bishop of Cork, Daniel Cohalan negotiated an agreement with Captain F. W. Dickie, aide-de-camp to Brigadier General W. F. H. Stafford, the General Officer Commanding (GOC) in Cork, that on the following Monday 1st May, the Volunteers would surrender their arms to the Lord Mayor for safekeeping and be allowed to go home. However, on Tuesday the British authorities seized the weapons and began arresting Volunteers.

Mac Curtain was arrested at his home on 11 May and jailed in various gaols in Britain until his release in December. After his release, two inquiries, one by the IRB and one by the Irish Volunteers, were held to review the failure of the Cork Brigade during the Rising. Both inquiries found no blame on Mac Curtain considering the multiple contradictory orders he received, however events of Easter week weighted heavily on him. By 1919, the Cork Brigade had expanded to twenty battalions, which was too big, and it was split into three brigades. Mac Curtain became commander of No.1 Brigade, which covered the city and middle of the county.

== Assassination ==
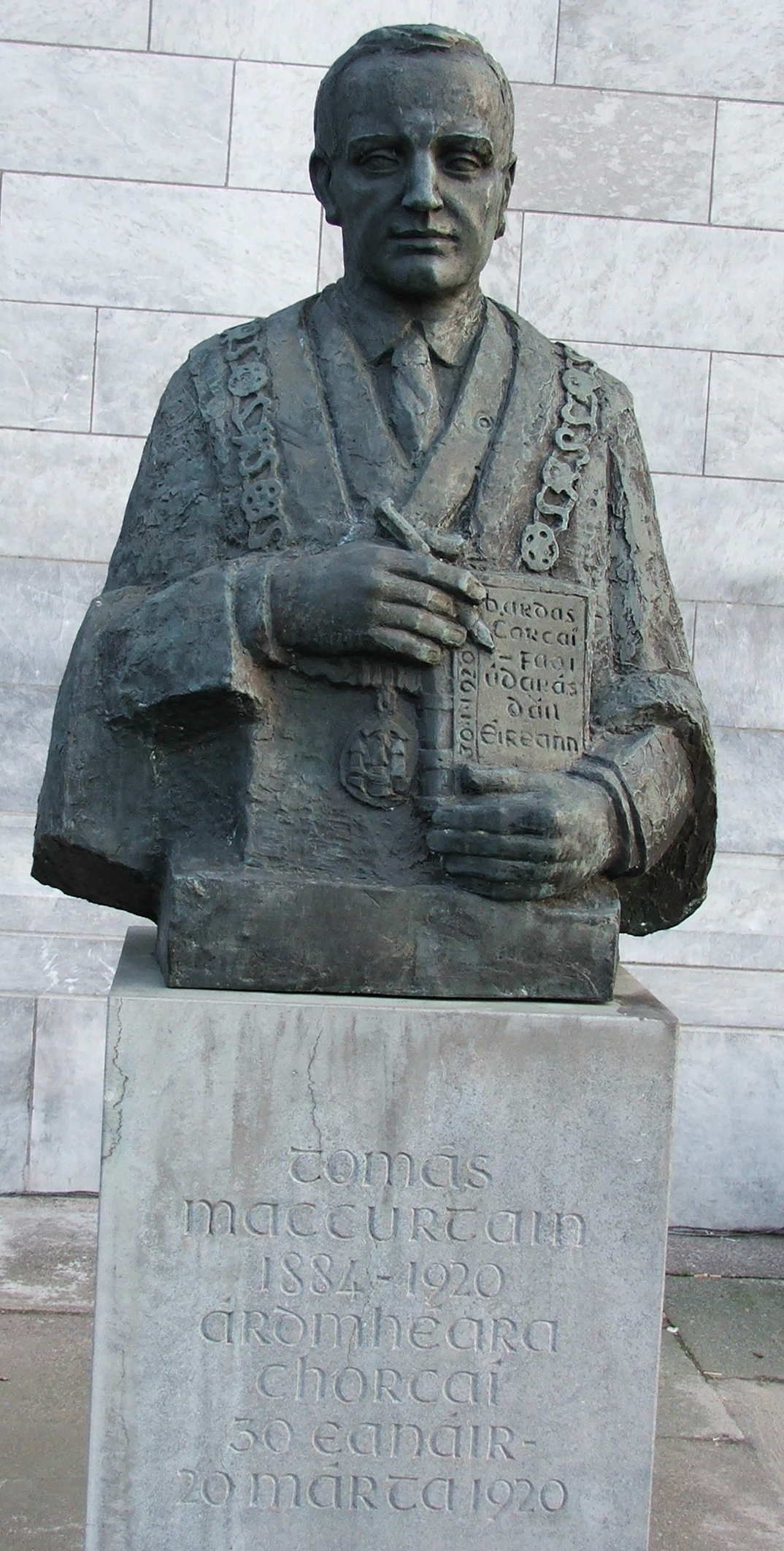
A memorial outside Cork City Hall which reads 'Tomás Mac Curtain 1884-1920 Ardmhéara Chorcaí 30 Eanáir- 20 Márta 1920'

While Mac Curtain continued his activities for both the Volunteers and Sinn Féin, he left the IRB considering it no longer necessary. However, this caused disputes with his vice-commandant, Sean O'Hegarty, who remained a senior commander in the IRB, preferred more aggressive attacks on the British, and also blamed Mac Curtain for the failure of 1916. However O'Hegarty's attacks on the Royal Irish Constabulary also caused retaliations. In the January 1920 local elections, Mac Curtain was elected Alderman in the Blackpool electoral area to Cork Corporation, and later elected Lord Mayor of Cork by his fellow councillors.

On 19 March 1920, O'Hegarty's men killed off-duty policeman Constable Joseph Murtagh. Very early the following morning several disguised men, later found to be RIC policemen, entered Mac Curtain's bedroom and shot him dead in front of his wife. The coroner's inquest passed a verdict of wilful murder against British Prime Minister Lloyd George, the Lord Lieutenant Lord French and members of the RIC, including District Inspector Oswald Swanzy.

The IRA sought out Mac Curtain's killers and in May, Sergeant Garvey and Constable Harrington were shot dead. Michael Collins used his intelligence assets to find Swanzy in Lisburn, County Antrim where he had been transferred. On 22 August 1920, Swanzy was shot dead by IRA men while leaving a church, with the first shot was fired from Mac Curtain's own revolver. His death resulted in an organised pogrom against local Catholics, as every Catholic business was burnt to the ground, and hundreds of Catholics fled in fear of their lives.

Mac Curtain is buried in St. Finbarr's Cemetery, Cork.

MacCurtain Street in the centre of Cork City is named after him.

=== Tomás Óg Mac Curtain ===
Mac Curtain's son, Tomás Óg (1915–1994) was a member of Anti-Treaty IRA. In 1935, while armed, he was arrested by unarmed Garda Patrick Malone, who received the Silver Scott Medal for bravery. In 1940, Tomás Óg, on being approached by three Gardaí, fired his revolver at Detective John Roche, who later died. Tomás Óg was convicted of murder and sentenced to death by hanging. His sentence was commuted to life imprisonment and he was released after serving only seven years. He later served on the IRA Executive during the Border Campaign.

Civic offices
Preceded by William F. O'Connor	Lord Mayor of Cork; 1920	Succeeded by Terence MacSwiney
