= Cathal Brugha =

Irish revolutionary and republican politician (1874–1922)

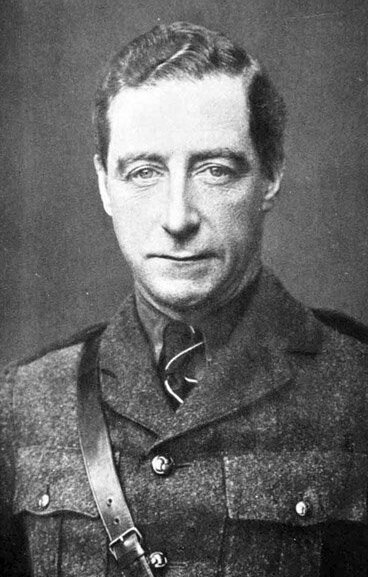
- Brugha, c.1920s

Minister for Defence
- In office 1 April 1919 – 9 January 1922
- President: Éamon de Valera
- Preceded by: Richard Mulcahy
- Succeeded by: Richard Mulcahy

Ceann Comhairle of Dáil Éireann
- In office 21 January 1919 – 22 January 1919
- Deputy: John J. O'Kelly
- Preceded by: Office established
- Succeeded by: Count Plunkett

President of Dáil Éireann
- In office 21 January 1919 – 1 April 1919
- Preceded by: New office
- Succeeded by: Éamon de Valera

Chief of Staff of the Irish Republican Army
- In office 27 October 1917 – 23 March 1918
- Preceded by: New office
- Succeeded by: Richard Mulcahy

Teachta Dála
- In office May 1921 – 7 July 1922
- Constituency: Waterford–Tipperary East
- In office December 1918 – May 1921
- Constituency: Waterford County

Personal details
- Born: Charles William St John Burgess; 18 July 1874 Dublin, Ireland
- Died: 7 July 1922 (aged 47) Dublin, Ireland
- Resting place: Glasnevin Cemetery, Dublin, Ireland
- Spouse: Caitlín Kingston (m. 1912)
- Children: 6, including Ruairí
- Education: Belvedere College

Military service
- Allegiance: Irish Republic
- Branch/service: Irish Volunteers; Irish Republican Army
- Years of service: 1913–1922
- Rank: Vice-Commandant, 4th Battalion, Irish Volunteers (1916)
- Commands: Chief of Staff, IRA (1917–1918)
- Conflicts: Easter Rising; Irish War of Independence; Irish Civil War
- Memorials: Cathal Brugha Street; Cathal Brugha Barracks

Cathal Brugha ([ˈkahəlˠ ˈbˠɾˠuː] KOH-ul BROO; born Charles William St John Burgess; 18 July 1874 – 7 July 1922) was an Irish republican politician who served as Minister for Defence from 1919 to 1922, Ceann Comhairle of Dáil Éireann in January 1919, the first president of Dáil Éireann from January 1919 to April 1919 and Chief of Staff of the Irish Republican Army from 1917 to 1918. He served as a Teachta Dála (TD) from 1918 to 1922.

He was active in the Easter Rising, the Irish War of Independence and the Irish Civil War. In 1919, he served briefly as the first Ceann Comhairle of Dáil Éireann as well as the first president of Dáil Éireann.

== Early life ==
Brugha was born in Dublin, of mixed Roman Catholic and Protestant parentage. He was the tenth child in a family of fourteen. His father, Thomas, was a cabinet maker and antique dealer who had been disinherited by his family for marrying an Irish Catholic, Maryanne Flynn.

Brugha attended Colmcille Schools on Dominick Street until 1888 when he moved to Belvedere College. He had intended to study medicine but this did not come to fruition after his father's business failed in 1890. Brugha was seen as an austere figure, not very different from Éamon de Valera, and was known not to smoke cigarettes, swear or drink alcohol.

== Political activity ==
In 1899, Brugha joined the Gaelic League, and he subsequently changed his name from Charles Burgess to Cathal Brugha. He met his future wife, Kathleen Kingston, at an Irish class in Birr, County Offaly, and they married in 1912 in the Church of Three Patrons in Rathgar (where fellow Belvederean James Joyce had sung in the choir before leaving for Europe). They had six children, five girls and one boy. Brugha became actively involved in the Irish Republican Brotherhood (IRB); in 1913, he became a lieutenant in the Irish Volunteers. He led a group of twenty Volunteers to receive the arms smuggled into Ireland in the Howth gun-running of 1914.

Brugha started work with Hayes & Finch, a firm supplying churches with candles. In 1909 he and two of his workmates, Anthony and Vincent Lalor, founded Lalor Ltd, a candlemaking and church supplies firm based at 14 Lower Ormond Quay; Brugha became a director and travelling salesman. Caitlín Kingston came from a family of large shopkeepers; later she ran Kingston's drapery, one of Dublin's central draperies.

He was second-in-command at the South Dublin Union under Commandant Éamonn Ceannt in the Easter Rising of 1916. On the Thursday of Easter Week, being badly wounded, he was unable to leave when the retreat was ordered. Brugha, weak from loss of blood, continued to fire upon the enemy, and was found by Eamonn Ceannt singing "God Save Ireland" with his pistol still in his hands. He was initially not considered likely to survive. He recovered over the next year, but was left with a permanent limp. Brugha was elected Ceann Comhairle of Dáil Éireann at its first meeting on 21 January 1919, and he read out the Declaration of Independence in Irish, which ratified "the establishment of the Irish Republic". On the following day, 22 January, he was appointed president of the ministry pro tempore. He retained this position until 1 April 1919, when Éamon de Valera took his place.

== Militant republicanism ==
=== War of Independence ===
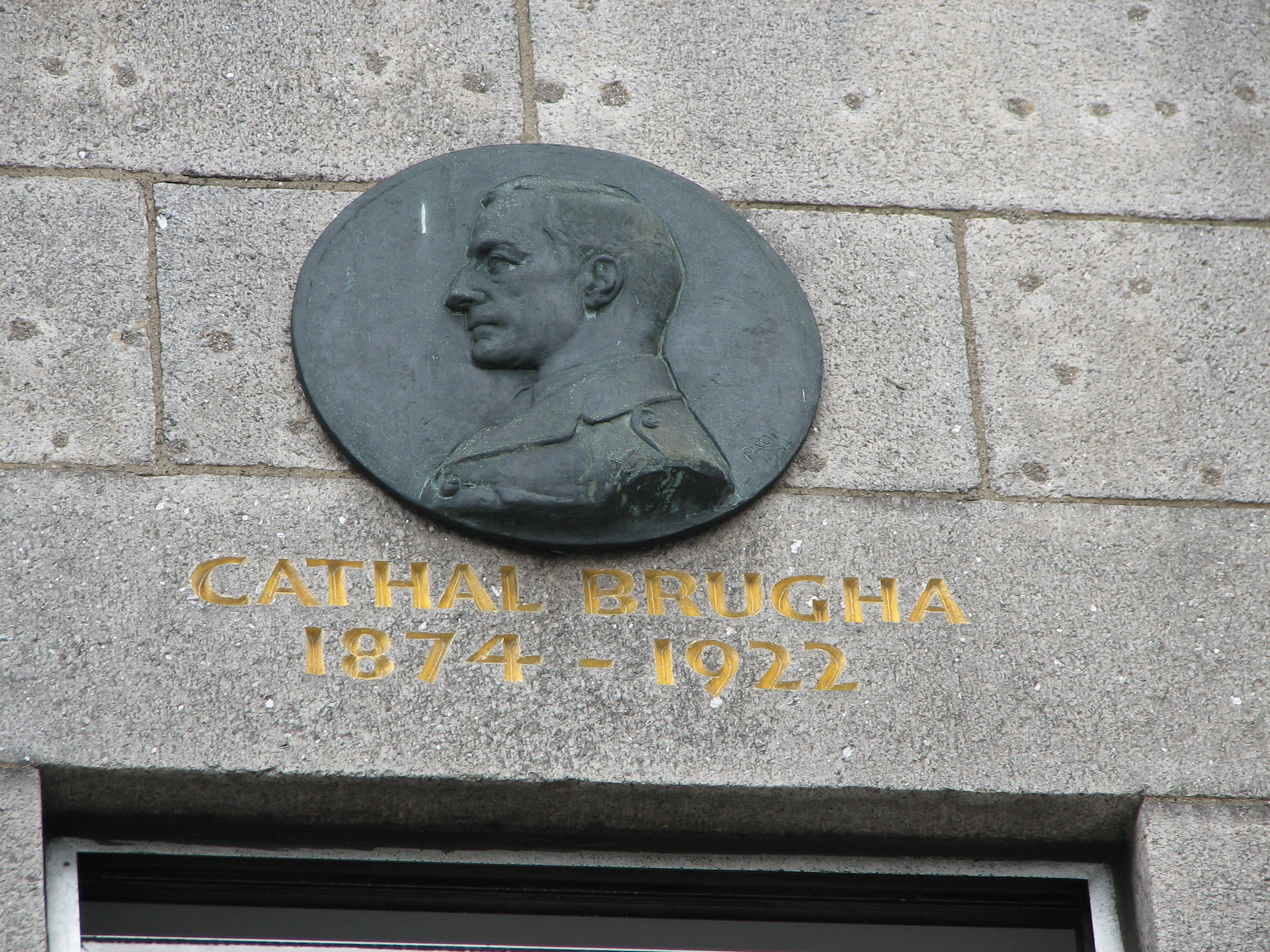
Cathal Brugha commemorative plaque in O'Connell Street, Dublin, at the northeast corner of the junction with Cathedral Street. (Bullet-marked stonework included as part of memorial)

He proposed a Republican constitution at the 1917 Sinn Féin convention, which was unanimously accepted. In October 1917, he became Chief of Staff of the Irish Republican Army and held that post until March 1918. All through the War of Independence, Brugha continued to run his business as a candle maker. He never went on the run.

He was elected as a Sinn Féin Member of Parliament (MP) for the County Waterford constituency at the 1918 general election. In January 1919, Sinn Féin MPs refused to recognise the Parliament of the United Kingdom and instead assembled at the Mansion House in Dublin as a revolutionary parliament called Dáil Éireann. Owing to the absence of Éamon de Valera and Arthur Griffith, Brugha presided over the first meeting of Dáil Éireann on 21 January 1919.

He had differences with Michael Collins, who, although nominally only the IRA's Director of Intelligence, had far more influence in the organisation as a result of his position as a high-ranking member of the IRB, an organisation that Brugha saw as undermining the power of the Dáil and especially the Ministry for Defence. Brugha opposed the oath of allegiance required for membership of the IRB. Brugha had left the IRB after the 1916 Rising and did not approve of a secret organization having control over the Volunteers or the Dail Eireann. In 1919, his proposition that all Volunteers should swear allegiance to the Irish Republic and the Dáil was adopted.

At a top-level IRA meeting in August 1920, Brugha argued against ambushes of Crown forces unless there was first a call to surrender, but it was dismissed as unrealistic by the brigade commanders present. Brugha also had the idea of moving the front line of the war to England, but was opposed by Collins. Brugha worked to maintain strict rules of conduct for members of the army and for the treatment of prisoners.

=== Civil War ===
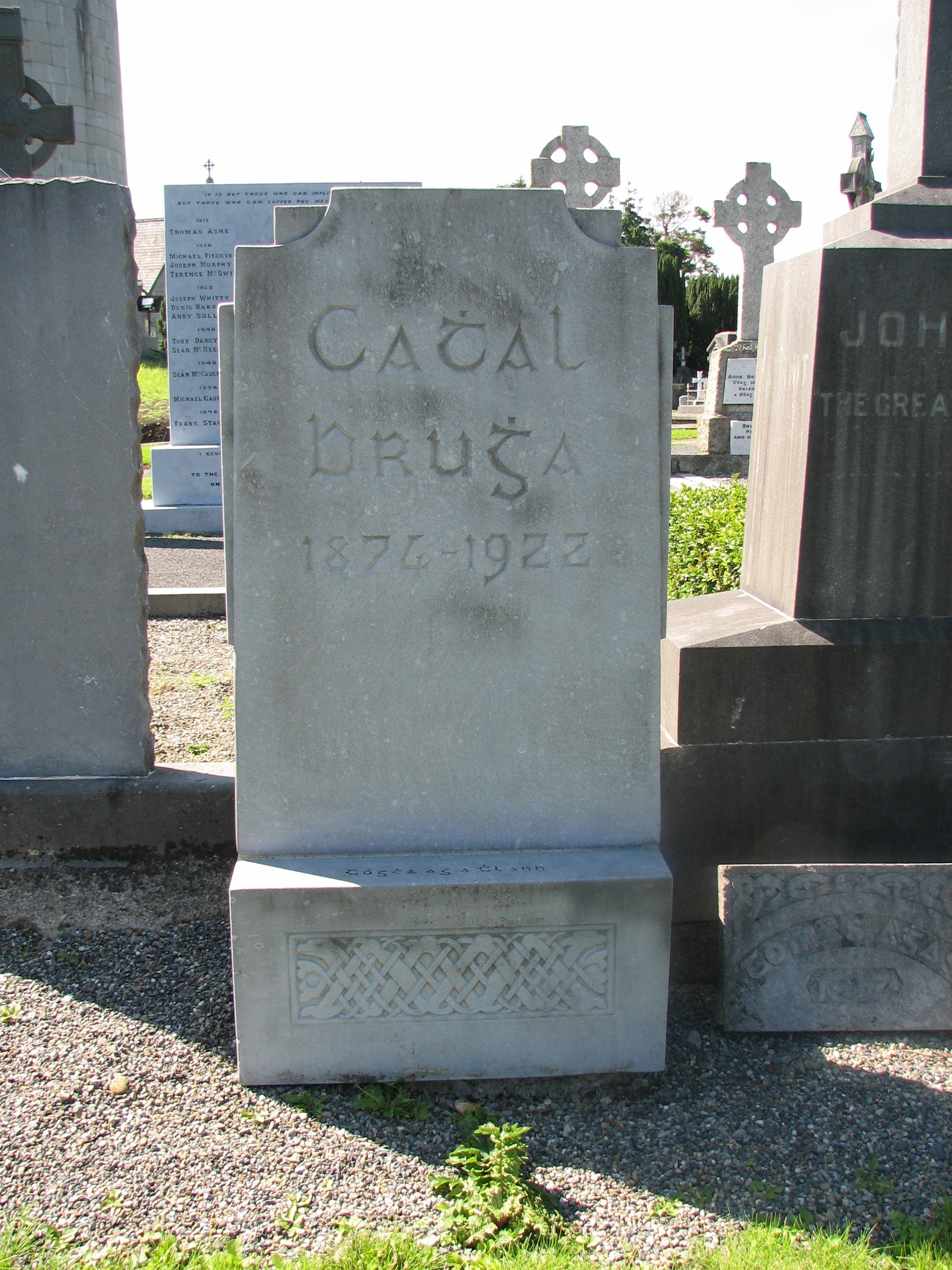
Cathal Brugha's grave at Glasnevin Cemetery, Dublin

On 7 January 1922, Brugha voted against the Anglo-Irish Treaty. During the Treaty Debates, he pointed out that Collins had only a middling rank in the Department for Defence, which supervised the IRA, even though Griffith hailed him as 'the man who had won the war'. It has been argued that, by turning the issue into a vote on Collins' popularity, Brugha swung the majority against his own side. Frank O'Connor, in his biography of Collins, states that two delegates who had intended to vote against the Treaty changed sides in sympathy with Collins. After the vote, the anti-Treaty TDs moved into opposition and Brugha was succeeded as Minister for Defence by Richard Mulcahy.

In the months between the Treaty debates and the outbreak of Civil War, Brugha attempted to dissuade his fellow anti-treaty army leaders including Rory O'Connor, Liam Mellows and Joe McKelvey from taking up arms against the Free State. When the IRA occupied the Four Courts, he and Oscar Traynor called on them to abandon their position. When they refused, Traynor ordered the occupation of the area around O'Connell Street in the hope of easing the pressure on the Four Courts and of forcing the Free State to negotiate.

On 28 June 1922, Brugha was appointed commandant of the forces in O'Connell Street. The outbreak of the Irish Civil War ensued in the first week of July when Free State forces commenced shelling of the anti-treaty positions.

Most of the anti-Treaty fighters under Oscar Traynor escaped from O'Connell Street when the buildings they were holding caught fire, leaving Brugha in command of a small rearguard. On 5 July 1922, he ordered his men to surrender but refused to do so himself. In Thomas Lane he then approached the Free State troops, brandishing a revolver and sustained a bullet wound to the leg which 'severed a major artery causing him to bleed to death'. Two members of the Irish republican women's paramilitary organisation Cumann na mBan were with Brugha when he died - Kathleen Barry Moloney (the sister of executed IRA man Kevin Barry) and Linda Kearns. He died on 7 July, eleven days before his 48th birthday. He had been re-elected as an anti-Treaty TD at the 1922 general election but died before the Dáil assembled. He is buried in Glasnevin Cemetery.

His wife Caitlín Brugha served as a Sinn Féin TD from 1923 to 1927. His son Ruairí Brugha later became a politician, firstly supporting Clann na Poblachta and later Fianna Fáil, and was elected to Dáil Éireann at the 1973 general election. Ruairí married Máire MacSwiney, the daughter of Terence MacSwiney, the Republican Lord Mayor of Cork who had died on hunger strike in 1920.

== Legacy and commemoration ==
Cathal Brugha Street and Cathal Brugha Barracks in Dublin and Cathal Brugha Street in Waterford are named after him. As of 2016, he is survived by his grandson Cathal MacSwiney Brugha and his great-grandson, Air Corps lieutenant Gearóid Ó Briain.

His wife, Caitlín Brugha, survived him, along with their five daughters and his son, Ruairí Brugha. Caitlín was elected as a Sinn Féin TD for Waterford; Ruairí would follow in his father's and mother's footsteps and become a Fianna Fáil TD in Dublin from 1973 to 1977.

Brugha is mentioned by name in "The Foggy Dew" with the lyrics:

"Oh had they died by Pearse's side Or fought with Cathal Brugha"

He is also mentioned in the song "Soldiers of '22" where the lyrics say:

"When their praise you sing let the echoes ring with the memory of Cathal Brugha"

== See also ==
- List of people on the postage stamps of Ireland
- Families in the Oireachtas

Parliament of the United Kingdom
New constituency	Member of Parliament for Waterford County; 1918–1922	Constituency abolished
Oireachtas
New constituency	Teachta Dála for Waterford County; 1918–1921	Constituency abolished
Political offices
New office	Ceann Comhairle of Dáil Éireann; 21–22 January 1919	Succeeded by Count Plunkett
New office	President of Dáil Éireann; Jan–Apr 1919	Succeeded by Éamon de Valera
Preceded by Richard Mulcahy	Minister for Defence; 1919–1921	Succeeded by Richard Mulcahy

Dáil	Election	Deputy (Party)	Deputy (Party)	Deputy (Party)	Deputy (Party)	Deputy (Party)
2nd	1921	Eamon Dee (SF)	Frank Drohan (SF)	Cathal Brugha (SF)	Vincent White (SF)	Séumas Robinson (SF)
3rd	1922	John Butler (Lab)	Nicholas Phelan (Lab)	Cathal Brugha (AT-SF)	Vincent White (PT-SF)	Daniel Byrne (FP)
4th	1923	Constituency abolished. See Waterford and Tipperary				
