= Ruairí Brugha =

Irish republican and politician (1917–2006)

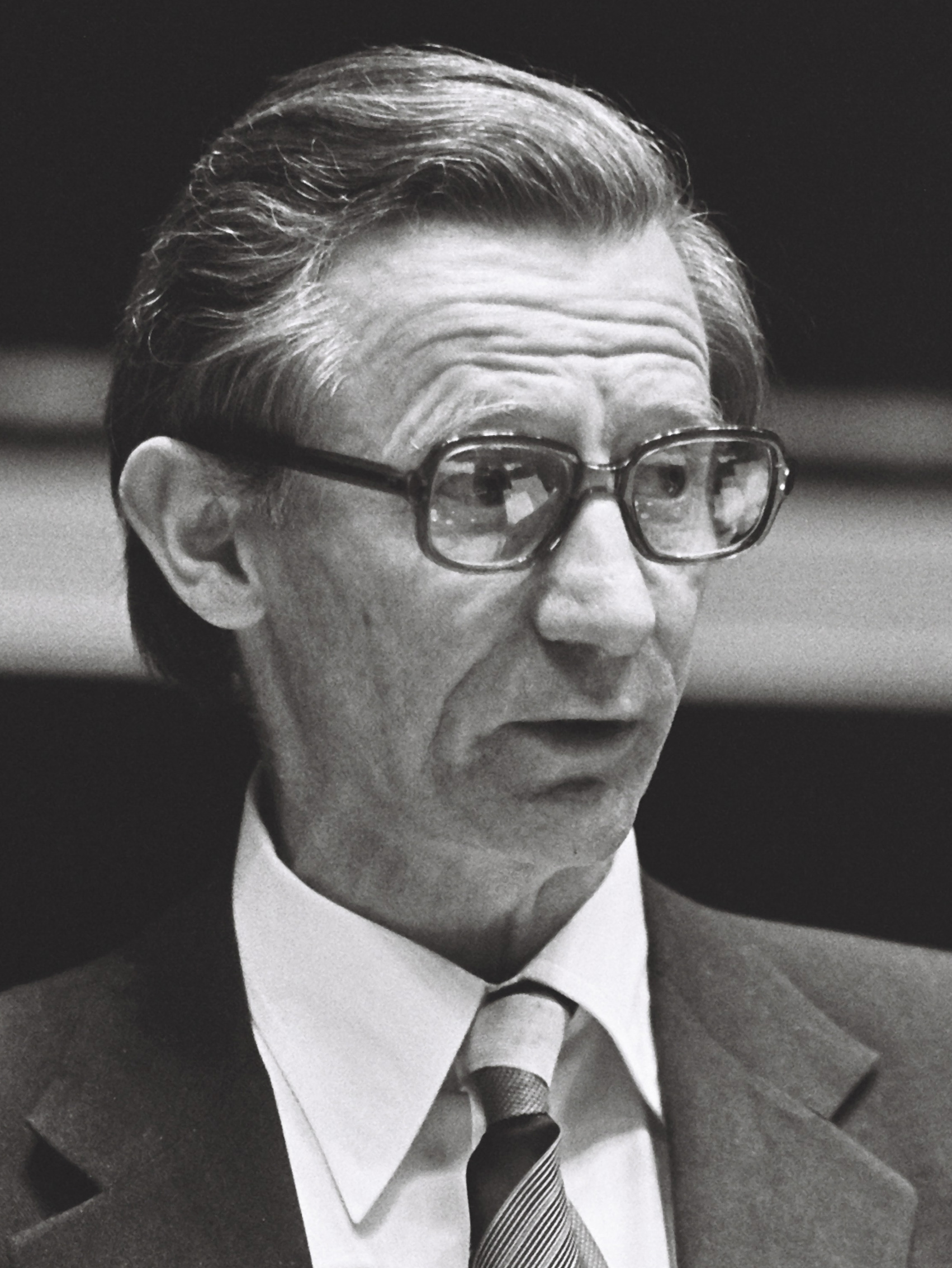
- Brugha in 1978

Member of the European Parliament
- In office December 1977 – June 1979
- Constituency: Oireachtas Delegation

Senator
- In office 16 June 1977 – 8 October 1981
- In office 5 November 1969 – 1 June 1973
- Constituency: Industrial and Commercial Panel

Teachta Dála
- In office February 1973 – June 1977
- Constituency: Dublin County South

Personal details
- Born: 15 October 1917 Dublin, Ireland
- Died: 31 January 2006 (aged 88) Dublin, Ireland
- Party: Fianna Fáil
- Other political affiliations: Clann na Poblachta (1946–1961)
- Spouse: Máire MacSwiney Brugha (m. 1941)
- Children: 4, including Cathal
- Parents: Cathal Brugha (father); Caitlín Kingston (mother)
- Education: Coláiste Mhuire; University College Dublin

Ruairí Brugha (Irish pronunciation: [ˈɾˠuəɾʲiː ˈbˠɾˠuː]; 15 October 1917 – 31 January 2006) was an Irish politician who served as a Member of the European Parliament (MEP) for Ireland from 1977 to 1979, Senator for the Industrial and Commercial Panel from 1969 to 1973 and 1977 to 1981 and a Teachta Dála (TD) for the Dublin County South constituency from 1973 to 1977. Brugha was a member of the Irish republican parties Clann na Poblachta (1946–1961) and Fianna Fáil.

== Family and early life ==
He was born in Dublin in 1917. He was the son of Cathal Brugha, who was Minister for Defence in the First Dáil and was killed in 1922, during the Civil War; his mother Caitlín Brugha (née Kingston) was an anti-Treaty TD from 1923 to 1927.

Brugha was brought up as an Irish speaker, and educated at Rockwell College and in Coláiste Mhuire, and joined the IRA at the age of 16. When IRA members were interned at the outbreak of World War II, he went on the run. He was eventually arrested in 1940, and interned at the Curragh for the duration of The Emergency. While on parole for health reasons he met Máire MacSwiney, the only child of Lord Mayor of Cork Terence MacSwiney who died while on hunger strike in 1920, and they married in Cork in July 1945. They had four children; three sons and a daughter.

Brugha then joined the business which his mother had established, the menswear shop Kingstons Ltd, eventually becoming managing director.

== Political career ==
Released from detention, he began to rethink his relationship with republicanism. Talking in 1968, to Tim Pat Coogan for his book The IRA, Brugha described his eventual rejection of the IRA's doctrine of the continued legitimacy of the second Dáil, saying: "We became the victims of an illusion that could never become a reality" and that "it was obvious to me that the 26 counties were politically free and that the sort of activity in which the IRA had been engaged had not helped to end Partition."

Ruairí and Máire both joined Clann na Poblachta shortly after its foundation in 1946, and at the 1948 general election, he stood in the Waterford constituency which his mother had represented in the 1920s. However, the election was a disappointment for the new party, which won only ten seats, and with less than 5% of the first-preference votes, Brugha did not win a seat. Despite differences with Clann na Poblachta leader Seán MacBride — particularly over MacBride's antagonism to Fianna Fáil — he remained on the party executive during the 1950s.

In 1962, he joined Fianna Fáil, and at the 1969 general election, Brugha stood unsuccessfully as a Fianna Fáil candidate in Dublin County South. He was then elected to the 12th Seanad on the Industrial and Commercial Panel, and at the 1973 general election, he won a seat in the Dáil, succeeding his former Fianna Fáil running mate Kevin Boland, who stood for his new Aontacht Éireann party. After that election, Fine Gael and Labour formed the National Coalition government led by Liam Cosgrave, and Fianna Fáil went into opposition for the first time in 16 years. In 1974, Jack Lynch appointed Brugha as Fianna Fáil Spokesman on Northern Ireland, where he helped reshape the party's policy and supported the Cosgrave government's position in favour of the Sunningdale Agreement.

After boundary changes, he lost his Dáil seat at the 1977 general election, to his party colleague, Niall Andrews. However, he was elected to the 14th Seanad, again on the Industrial and Commercial Panel. On the recommendation of John Hume, he was also appointed as an MEP, serving until the first direct elections to the European Parliament in 1979, when he stood unsuccessfully in the Dublin constituency. He was also active in the European Movement Ireland into his late eighties, serving as an honorary president of the organisation.

Brugha did not contest the 1981 or February 1982 general elections, but at the November 1982 election he stood in Dublin South, where he polled less than 3% of the first-preference votes, and did not stand for election again.

== Death ==
He died in Dublin on 31 January 2006, at the age of 88. On his death Taoiseach Bertie Ahern said Ruairí Brugha was "a man of firm convictions who was passionate about politics and had a deep patriotic concern for the welfare of this country". His wife, Máire, died on 20 May 2012, aged 93.

In 2006, Máire's memoir History's Daughter: A Memoir from the Only Child of Terence MacSwiney was published by O'Brien Press. It includes a detailed account of her husband's life, before and after their marriage.

== See also ==
- Families in the Oireachtas

Dáil	Election	Deputy (Party)	Deputy (Party)	Deputy (Party)
19th	1969	Kevin Boland (FF)	Tom O'Higgins (FG)	Richard Burke (FG)
19th	1970 by-election	Larry McMahon (FG)	Tom O'Higgins (FG)	Richard Burke (FG)
20th	1973	Larry McMahon (FG)	Ruairí Brugha (FF)	Richard Burke (FG)
21st	1977	John Kelly (FG)	Niall Andrews (FF)	John Horgan (Lab)
22nd	1981	Constituency abolished. See Dublin South		
