= 1923 Irish hunger strikes =

1923 Hunger strike

In October 1923 mass hunger strikes were undertaken by Irish republican prisoners protesting the continuation of their internment without trial. The Irish Civil War had ended six months earlier yet the newly formed Provisional Government of the Irish Free State was slow in releasing the thousands of Irish republican prisoners opposed to the Anglo-Irish Treaty.

== Background ==
In the 20th-century, 22 Irish republicans died while on hunger strike. In the early part of 20th century hunger strikes were adopted as a protest of last resort by Irish republican prisoners. In the period between 1916 and 1918 there had been over a dozen hunger strikes in Ireland. In the period between August 1918 and October 1923 over 30 more hunger strikes occurred. Eight Irish republicans died during these hunger strikes with many more suffering health complications at later dates. Irish revolutionary Thomas Ashe died as a result of forced feedings on 25 September 1917 in Mountjoy Prison. He was arrested after making a speech in County Longford and was charged with "causing disaffection" among the people. After the death of Ashe, the remaining striking prisoners were granted political status and ended that hunger strike.

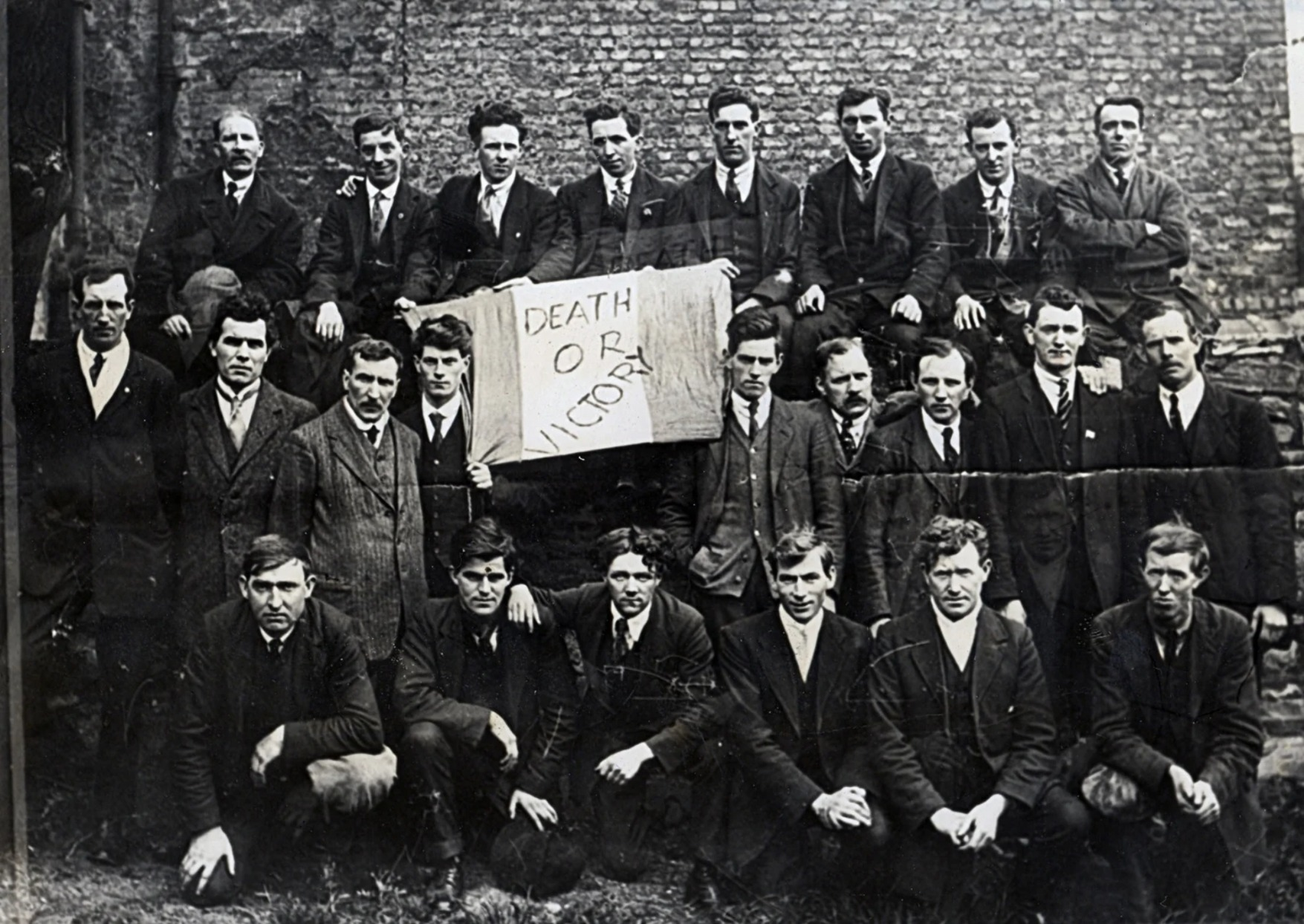
Released Belfast Hunger Strikers May 1920

=== Mountjoy Hunger Strike of 1920 ===
A highly publicized hunger strike began on Easter Monday, 5 April 1920, when sixty men went on hunger strike protesting their internment without charges/trials and demanding release or political prisoner status. Eventually there were 101 men participating in the strike which brought much media attention to the hunger strikers. At that time this was the largest hunger strike in Irish history. The British government made the decision to not interfere with and to support the decisions concerning the hunger strikers made by their representative in Ireland - the Lord Lieutenant of Ireland John French. After large demonstrations (estimates range from 5,000 to 10,000) and a general strike throughout Dublin, the government released the prisoners (14 April 1920). Within the following month, approximately 200 internees were also released from HM Prison Wormwood Scrubs in London.

Peadar Clancy and Frank Gallagher led the Mountjoy hunger strikers and refused all concessions from the prison authorities. After a 14-day strike, Clancy was able to successfully negotiate the release of all hunger strikers being detained in Mountjoy. On 3 May 1920 the special powers (searching of individuals/property and internment) given to the military were cancelled (see Defence of the Realm Act 1914). Those powers were quickly returned to the military in the Restoration of Order in Ireland Act 1920.

=== Cork Hunger Strike of 1920 ===
On 13 August 1920 seventy-eight Irish republican prisoners went on hunger strike in Cork County Gaol demanding a general, immediate and unconditional release. Notables in the group included Terence MacSwiney the Lord Mayor of Cork and Liam Lynch, Irish Republican Army Commandant, Cork No 2 Brigade. A week into the hunger strike, all but 11 of the hunger strikers were released or deported to prisons in England.

During the course of the strike three fully observed work stoppages took place in Cork. These work stoppages were organised by the city's Civic and Labour Council allowing workers to attend masses for the hunger strikers. On 12 November 1920 (after 94 days) the men were directed to come off the strike by Arthur Griffith. Griffith said that they had 'sufficiently proved their devotion and fidelity, and that they should now, as they were prepared to die for Ireland, prepare again to live for her.'

When the hunger strike was called off the remaining nine strikers required hospitalization and all died relatively young. This strike resulted in three death from starvation: MacSwiney (d. 25 October 1920) in Brixton Prison, London (he had been transferred there from Cork Gaol) and two men died in Cork Gaol – Michael Fitzgerald (d.17 October 1920) and Joe Murphy (d. 25 October 1920).

== End of the Irish Civil War ==
In the spring of 1923 it became evident to the anti Anglo-Irish Treaty Irish Republican Army (IRA) that they could not win the Irish Civil War. On 20 April 1923 Frank Aiken assumed the leadership position (Chief of Staff) of the anti-treaty IRA. He ordered a cessation of military operations on 30 April and his ceasefire order to 'dump arms' on 24 May 1923 effectively ended the Irish Civil War. Aiken wrote "We took up arms to free our country and we'll keep them until we see an honourable way of reaching our objective without arms." With no decisive battle or formal surrender by the anti- treaty IRA, Republicans continued to be rounded up and interned by the Irish Free State Army. The civil war was now ended, but the Irish Free State still had to deal with at least 12,000 anti treaty men and women in prison. The Free State government did not issue a general amnesty to the IRA internees until the following year (1924), leaving many republican prisoners interned long after the ending of the war.

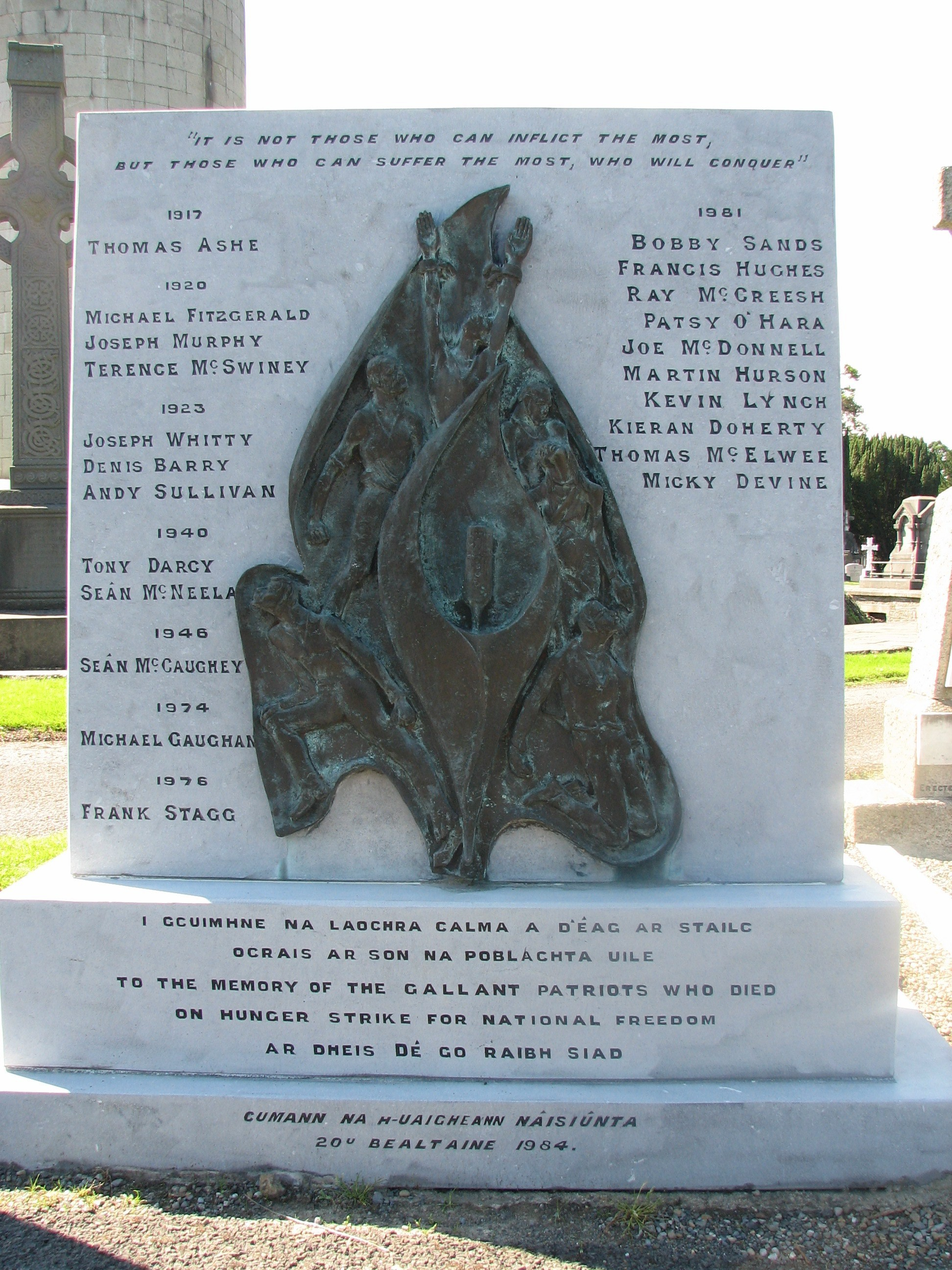
Hunger Strikers Memorial Glasnevin Cemetery Dublin

== 1923 independent and mass hunger strikes ==
In early 1923 hunger strikes were not an official policy of the IRA and were not directed by its General Headquarters. Instead, each hunger striker made an individual decision to strike. Several individual and large scale hunger strikes occurred in 1923.

=== Women hunger strikers ===
In February 1923, 50 women members of Cumann na mBan (an Irish republican women's paramilitary organization formed in Dublin in 1914) went on hunger strike for 34 days over the arrest and imprisonment without trial of Irish republican prisoners. Members included Maire Comerford, Mary MacSwiney, Sheila Humphreys, Anna Kelly and Lily O'Brennan. That strike resulted in the release of the women hunger-strikers. In March 1923 about 300 Irish Republican women were being held in various prisons in Dublin. That month 97 women went on hunger strike in Kilmainham Gaol after all of their privileges had been denied without explanation (that hunger strike ended later in the month with the restoration of privileges). Annie (Nan) Hogan of Cumann na mBan died at the age of 24 after being released from prison (September 1923) "in a very emaciated state" due to her participation in hunger strikes in Kilmainham and the North Dublin Union jails. Hogan was a native of County Clare and was arrested for assisting a group of republicans in an escape attempt from Limerick Jail. Constance Markievicz was a leader of Sinn Féin, a revolutionary who opposed the Anglo Irish treaty and was the first woman to be elected to the British parliament (she refused to take her seat). She was arrested several times and in November 1923, went on hunger strike until all Irish Republican women prisoners were released – just prior to Christmas. During this time members of Cumann na mBan maintained a constant protest outside of the gates to Mountjoy Prison.

=== Rioting/Start of Mass hunger strikes ===
On 13 September 1923 prisoners took over the central area of Mountjoy Prison. Six days of rioting and violence followed with control of the prison switching between the prisoners and prison authorities/Irish Army. At the end of the rioting prisoners faced harsh conditions in their wrecked cells with many of them injured.

By October 1923, there were approximately 5,000 Irish republicans on hunger strike. In October 1923, the new Irish Government hinted that all prisoners would be released by Christmas (many of the prisoners had been held for over a year).

After a week of rioting the largest hunger strike in Irish history started at midnight on 14 October 1923 in Mountjoy Prison. Mountjoy had 424 prisoners on Hunger Strike with 11 of them being elected member of the Irish Parliament (Dáil Éireann). Irish Civil War internees were led by Peadar O'Donnell who asked the IRA General Headquarters (GHQ) to pass a message to the other prisons and camps advising them of their intentions to begin a hunger strike. Multiple hunger strikes began soon after receiving the message from the GHQ.

The mass hunger strikes of October/November 1923 saw several thousand Irish republican prisoners on hunger strikes in Irish prisons/internment camps across Ireland, protesting the continuation of internment without charge/trial, demanding immediate release or status as political prisoners. Previously, the Irish Free State government had passed a motion outlawing the release of prisoners on hunger strike. In Dublin thousands of protesters kept vigil outside the prisons, often singing or reciting prayers.

Estimates on the number of prisoners participating in the mass hunger strikes of 1923 range from 2,000 to over 8,000 out of a total prisoner population of 10,000. One estimate states that by 24 October 1923 approximately 7,000 men were on hunger strike: 3,900 in the Curragh Camp (Tintown & Hare Park Internment Camp), 1,700 in Newbridge Prison, 462 in Mountjoy Prison, 70 in Cork City Gaol, 350 in Kilkenny Prison, 200 in Dundalk Gaol, 711 in Gormanstown Internment Camps and in the newly formed Northern Ireland 263 were held under horrific conditions on the Prison Ship (hulk) Argenta in Belfast Lough, 131 in Belfast, 70 in Derry, and 40 in Larne. (see The Troubles in Ulster (1920–1922)).

The protest lasted 41 days and spread to at least ten other prisons/internment camps. By late October many strikers had come off of the hunger strike after being promised release. On 12 November 1923 the hunger strike was called off in Cork jail. After a sixteen-day hunger strike, all women prisoners being held in the North Dublin Union were released (17 November 1923). At the end of the hunger strike many men had been fasting for more than 34 days.

=== 1923 Irish hunger strike deaths ===
On 10 June 1923 Dan Downey died in the Curragh Camp due to the effects of an earlier hunger-strike. Downey was the first of five IRA men to die while on hunger strike in 1923. Joseph Whitty (aged 19) went on an independent hunger strike and died as a result on 2 August 1923 (also in the Curragh Camp). Several deaths occurred due to starvation near the end of the 41 day hunger strike: Denny Barry from County Cork, died 20 November 1923 in the prison hospital of the Curragh Camp, Andy O'Sullivan, from County Cavan, died 23 November 1923, in Mountjoy Prison. On 24 December 1923 Joe Lacey (the brother of IRA Officer Dinny Lacey) died at the Curragh Camp (the hunger strike had been called off in November 1923 but Lacey died as a result of his weakened condition).

== End of strike/release of internees ==
The protest was called off on 23 November 1923 by leadership in the prisons/camps – Thomas Derrig in Kilmainham Gaol, Michael Kilroy, Frank Gallagher and Peadar O'Donnell in Mountjoy. On that date there were still 176 men on hunger strike, some for 41 days and others for 34 days. Messages were sent from Kilmainham Gaol to each prison stating that all internees would end the strike together. The day after the end of the strike (24 November 1923) more than 500 prisoners were released from prisons across Ireland.

With the end of the mass hunger strikes many men were released within a month, on the condition that they sign an oath of loyalty to the newly established Irish Free State. Prisoner leader Peadar O'Donnell expressed his feelings on the required signature: "...they demanded that each one sign a form that he would accept the rule of the new garrison in Ireland." Although many of the internees were released in November 1923, five or six hundred remained incarcerated into late December. In June 1924 one hundred and twenty detainees were released from different prisons leaving three hundred still incarcerated. The anti-treaty Minister of Finance Austin Stack, the assistant chief of staff of the anti-treaty IRA Ernie O'Malley were released from the Curragh, along with Seán Russell, in July 1924, well over a year after the end of hostilities. It was not until January 1926 that the last republican prisoners were released from Derry Gaol in Northern Ireland.

== Aftermath of the 1923 hunger strikes ==
Although the fighting was mostly over, the bitterness of the Irish Civil War continued. As late as 1924, there were "...constant raids on victims homes in an effort to eradicate the last vestige of resistance." Many men and women who had been on protracted hunger strikes never fully recovered from their ordeal and died an early death. Because of the preferential employment policies of the Free State government, many Anti-Treaty Irish republicans emigrated from Ireland.

Later in the 20th-century Irish republicans continued to use hunger strikes as the protest of last resort: Tony D'Arcy (d. 16 April 1940 after a 52-day Hunger-strike), Jack McNeela (d. 19 April 1940 after 55 days on hunger strike), Seán McCaughey (d.11 May 1946 after 23 days on hunger strike), Michael Gaughan (d. 3 June 1974 after 55 days on hunger strike/forced feedings) and Frank Stagg (d. 12 February 1976 after 62 days on hunger strike) in Wakefield Prison, England. In October/November 1980, seven Irish republican prisoners participated in a hunger strike in HM Prison Maze in Northern Ireland which ended after 53 days. Ten Irish republicans died during the 1981 Irish hunger strike (March–October 1981).
