= Hunger strike =

Form of protest or political activism

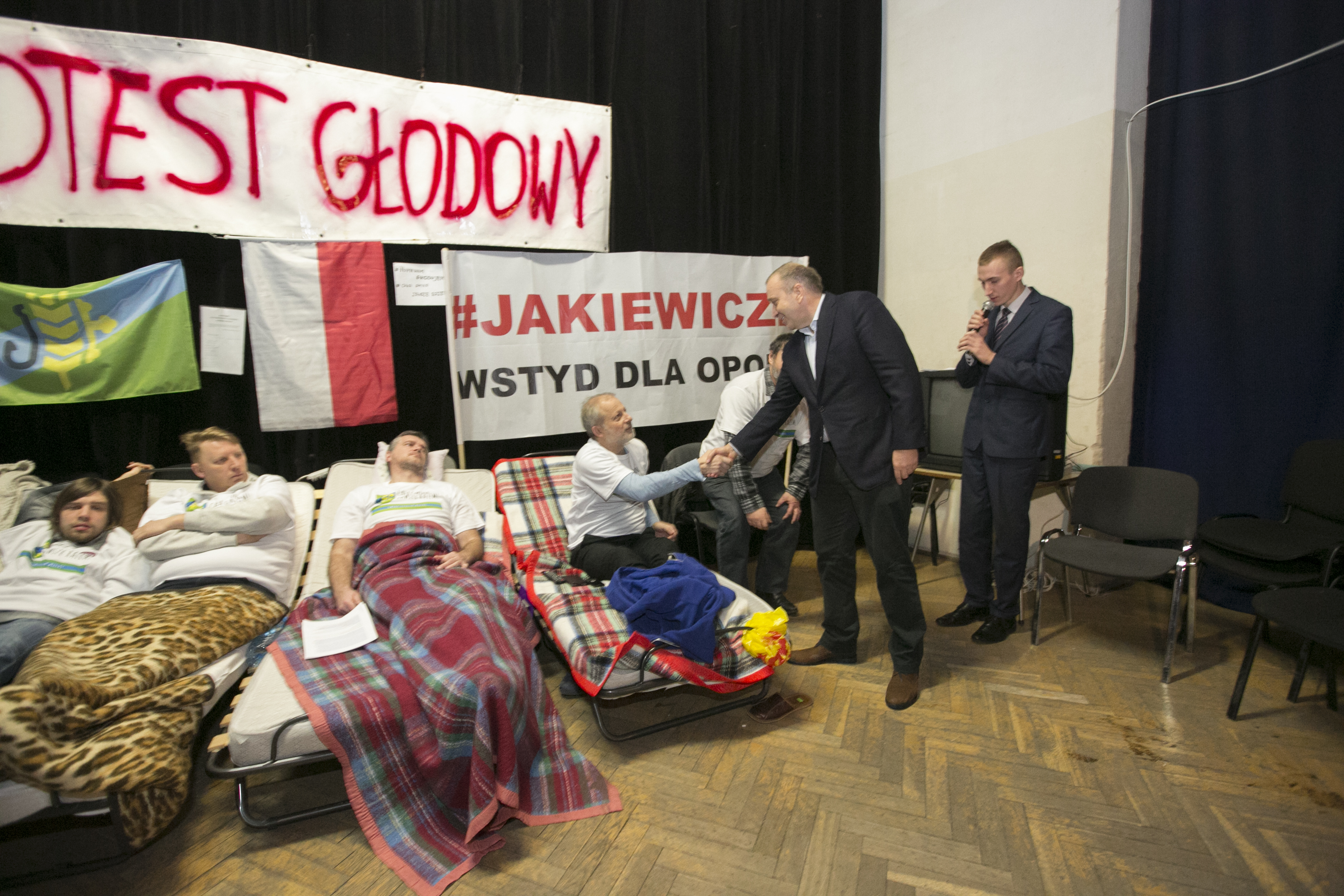
Residents of Dobrzeń Wielki, Poland, in 2017, protesting the planned incorporation of their community to the city of Opole

A hunger strike is a method of non-violent resistance where participants fast as an act of political protest, usually with the objective of achieving a specific goal, such as a policy change. Hunger strikers that do not take fluids are named dry hunger strikers.

In cases where an entity (usually the state) has or is able to obtain custody of the hunger striker (such as a prisoner), the hunger strike is often terminated by the custodial entity through the use of force-feeding.

== Early history ==
Fasting was used as a method of protesting injustice in pre-Christian Ireland, where it was known as Troscadh or Cealachan. Detailed in the contemporary civic codes, it had specific rules by which it could be used, and the fast was often carried out on the doorstep of the home of the offender. Scholars speculate that this was due to the high importance the culture placed on hospitality. Allowing a person to die at one's doorstep, for a wrong of which one was accused, was considered a great dishonor. Others say that the practice was to fast for one whole night, as there is no evidence of people fasting to death in pre-Christian Ireland. The fasts were primarily undertaken to recover debts or get justice for a perceived wrong. Legends of Saint Patrick, the patron saint of Ireland, have used the hunger strike as well.

In India, the practice of a hunger protest, where the protester fasts at the door of an offending party (typically a debtor) in a public call for justice, was abolished by the government in 1861; this indicates the prevalence of the practice prior to that date, or at least a public awareness of it.

== Medical view ==
In the first three days, the body still uses energy from glucose. After that, the liver starts processing body fat, in a process called ketosis. After depleting fat, the body enters a "starvation mode". At this point the body starts breaking down muscle and vital organs for energy, and loss of bone marrow becomes life-threatening. There are examples of hunger strikers dying after 46 to 73 days of strike, for example the 1981 Irish hunger strike. Hunger strikers can experience hallucinations and delirium. Obese individuals can last longer. As the body approaches the final stages of starvation, it enters a state of "terminal restlessness" in which the organ systems shut down. This triggers unexpected and extreme physical agitation, vocal thrashing, and short bursts of physical strength. This is the point where medical professionals face the bioethical dilemma of the "rule of double effect". This is where choosing to halt the starvation process violates the patient's autonomy while offering just palliative comfort care essentially accelerates the patient's death. Death usually occurs when a hunger striker has lost about 40–50% of their pre-strike weight at about 60–70 days in.

== Examples ==
=== British and American suffragettes ===
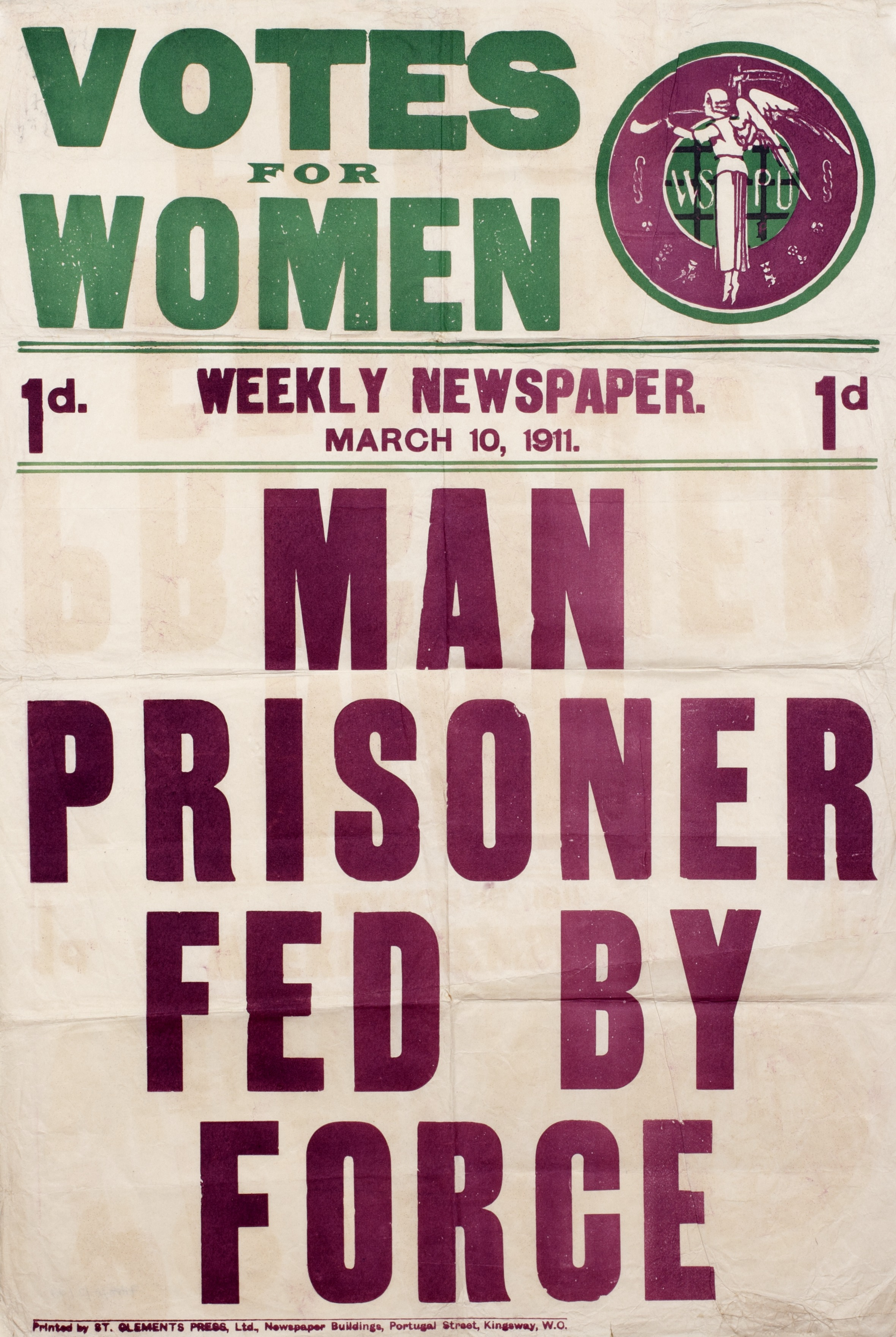
A 1911 headline in Votes for Women about William Ball being force-fed in prison to end his hunger strike

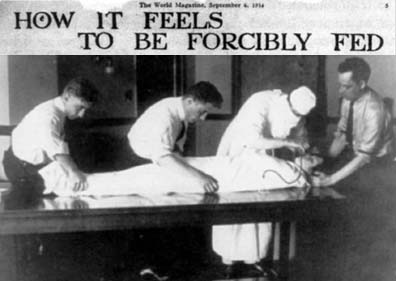
Clipping from World Magazine, September 6, 1914.

In the early 20th century, suffragettes frequently endured hunger strikes in British prisons. Marion Dunlop was the first in 1909. She was released, as the authorities did not want her to become a martyr. Other suffragettes in prison also undertook hunger strikes. The prison authorities subjected them to force-feeding, which the suffragettes categorized as a form of torture. Emmeline Pankhurst's sister Mary Clarke died shortly after being force-fed in prison, and others including Lady Constance Bulwer-Lytton are believed to have had serious health problems caused by force feeding, dying of a heart attack not long after. William Ball, a working class supporter of women's suffrage, was the subject of a pamphlet Torture in an English Prison not only due to the effects of force-feeding, but a cruel separation from family contact and mental health deterioration, secret transfer to a lunatic asylum and needed lifelong mental institutional care. In December 1912, a Scottish prison put four suffragettes in the 'political prisoner' category rather than 'criminal' second division, but staff at Craiginches Prison, Aberdeen still subjected them to force-feeding when they went on hunger strike.

In 1913, the Prisoners (Temporary Discharge for Ill Health) Act 1913 (nicknamed the "Cat and Mouse Act") changed policy. Hunger strikes were tolerated but prisoners were released when they became sick. When they had recovered, the suffragettes were taken back to prison to finish their sentences. About 100 women received medals for hunger striking or enduring force-feeding.

Like their British counterparts, American suffragists also used this method of political protest. A few years before the passage of the Nineteenth Amendment to the United States Constitution, a group of American suffragists led by Alice Paul engaged in a hunger strike and endured forced feedings while incarcerated at the Occoquan Workhouse in Virginia.

=== Ireland ===
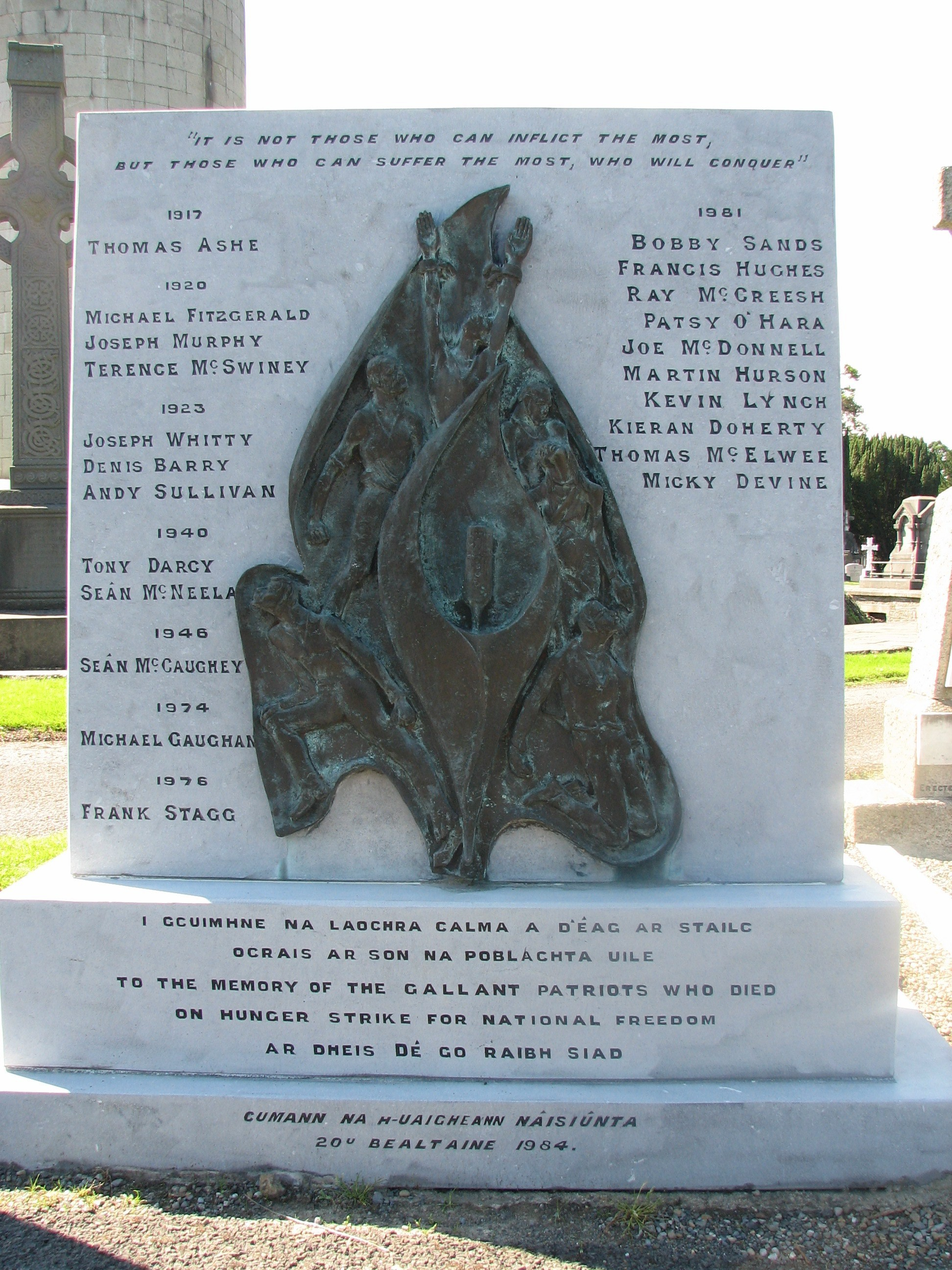
Irish Hunger Strikers Memorial Glasnevin Cemetery, Dublin

Hunger strikes have deep roots in Irish society and in the Irish psyche. Fasting in order to bring attention to an injustice which one felt under his lord, and thus shame him, was a common feature of early Irish society and this tactic was fully incorporated into the Brehon legal system. The tradition is ultimately most likely part of the still older Indo-European tradition of which the Irish were part. Within the 20th century a total of 22 Irish republicans died on hunger strike with survivors suffering long-term health and psychological effects.

The tactic was used by physical force republicans during the 1916–23 revolutionary period. Early use of hunger strikes was countered with force-feeding, culminating in 1917 in the death of Thomas Ashe in Mountjoy Prison. In 1920, many Irish prisoners were transferred to British prisons, in April 1920 150 Irish Republican prisoners went on hunger strike in HM Prison Wormwood Scrubs, London.

During the Anglo-Irish war, in October 1920, the Lord Mayor of Cork, Terence MacSwiney, died on hunger strike in Brixton prison. At the same time, the 1920 Cork hunger strike took place. Two other Cork Irish Republican Army (IRA) men, Joe Murphy and Michael Fitzgerald, died in this protest. Demanding reinstatement of political status and release from prison, nine men undertook a hunger strike at Cork County Gaol for 94 days, from August 11 to November 12, 1920. Arthur Griffith called off the strikes after the deaths of MacSwiney, Murphy and Fitzgerald.

During the early 1920s, the vessel HMS Argenta was used as a prison ship for the holding of Irish republicans by the British. Conditions on board were "unbelievable" and there were several hunger strikes, including one involving upwards of 150 men in the winter of 1923.

==== Irish hunger strikes between 1923 and 1976 ====
In February 1923, 23 women (members of Cumann na mBan) went on hunger strike for 34 days over the arrest and imprisonment without trial of Irish republican prisoners. The Free State subsequently released the female republican prisoners. Most of the male republicans were not released until the following year. After the end of the Irish Civil War in October 1923, up to 8,000 IRA prisoners went on hunger strike to protest their continued detention by the Irish Free State (a total of over 12,000 republicans had been interned by May 1923). Three men, Denny Barry, Joseph Whitty, and Andy O'Sullivan, died during the 1923 Irish Hunger Strikes. The strike, however, was called off by Republican leadership in the camps (November 23, 1923) before any more deaths occurred.

Under de Valera's first Fianna Fáil government in 1932, military pensions were awarded to dependants of republicans who died in 1920s hunger strikes on the same basis as those who were killed in action. During the state of emergency of World War II another De Valera government interned many IRA members, three of whom died on hunger strike: Sean McCaughey, Tony D'Arcy and Jack McNeela. Hundreds of others carried out shorter hunger strikes during the de Valera years.

The tactic was revived by the Provisional Irish Republican Army (IRA) in the early 1970s, when several republicans successfully used hunger strikes to get themselves released from custody without charge in the Republic of Ireland. Michael Gaughan died after being force-fed in Parkhurst Prison in 1974. Frank Stagg, an IRA member being held in Wakefield Prison, died in 1976 after a 62-day hunger strike which he began as a campaign to be repatriated to Ireland.

Members of other movements like Holger Meins of German Red Army Faction used hunger strikes as a political weapon at this time. Meins went on hunger strike for the first time in 1973 together with other prisoners in protest against the prison conditions. The RAF prisoners wanted to be pooled together and claimed prisoner of war status. The 1.83m tall Meins still weighed 39 kg in November 1973, and died in prison.

==== Irish hunger strike of 1981 ====
In 1980, seven Irish Republican prisoners, six from the IRA and one from the Irish National Liberation Army, in the Maze Prison launched a hunger strike as a protest against the revocation by the British Government of a prisoner-of-war-like Special Category Status for paramilitary prisoners in Northern Ireland. The strike, led by Brendan Hughes, was called off before any deaths, when the British Government seemed to offer to concede their demands; however, the government then reneged on the details of the agreement. The prisoners then called another hunger strike the following year. This time, instead of many prisoners striking at the same time, the hunger strikers started fasting one after the other in order to maximise publicity over the fate of each one.

Bobby Sands was the first of ten Irish republican paramilitary prisoners to die after 66 days during the 1981 hunger strike, with Mickey Devine being the last to die after 60 days. There was widespread sympathy for the hunger strikers from Irish republicans and the broader nationalist community on both sides of the Irish border. Sands was elected as an MP for Fermanagh and South Tyrone to the United Kingdom's House of Commons and two other prisoners, Paddy Agnew (who was not a hunger striker) and Kieran Doherty, were elected to Dáil Éireann in the Republic of Ireland by electorates who wished to register their opposition to British government policies. The ten men survived without food for 46 to 73 days, taking only water and salt, before succumbing. After the deaths of the men and severe public disorder, the British Government granted partial concessions to the prisoners, and the strike was called off. The hunger strikes gave a significant propaganda boost to a previously severely demoralised IRA.

=== Gandhi and Bhagat Singh ===
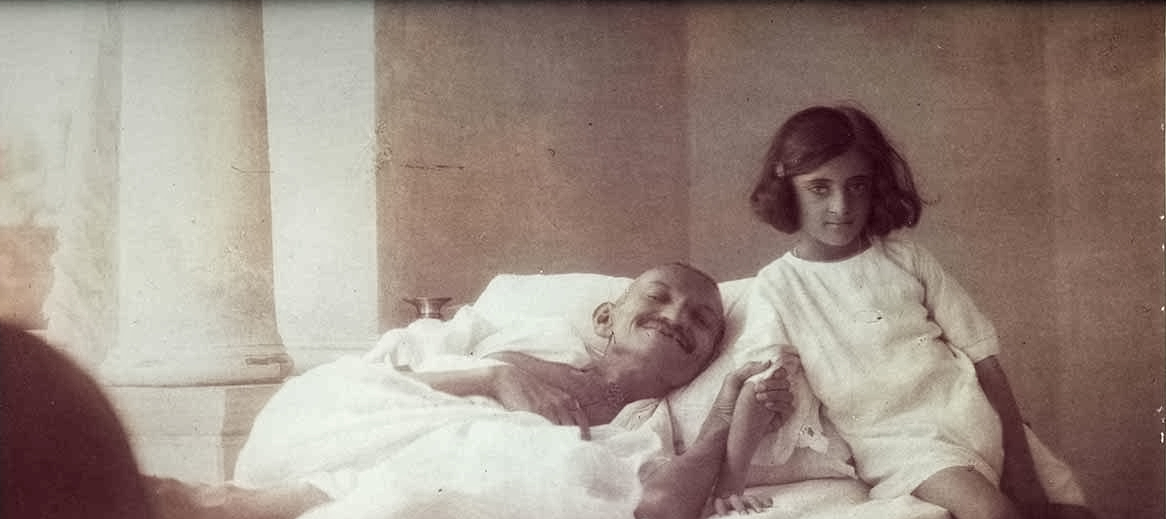
Mahatma Gandhi with a young Indira Gandhi, during his fast in 1924, (remastered)

Mahatma Gandhi was imprisoned in 1908, 1909, 1913, 1917, 1919, 1922, 1930, 1932, 1933, and 1942. He engaged in several famous hunger strikes to protest British rule in India. Because of Gandhi's public image, British authorities did not want to allow him to die in their custody.

In addition to Gandhi, various others used the hunger strike option during the Indian independence movement, including Bhagat Singh.

=== Potti Sriramulu ===
In 1952, in independent India, revolutionary Potti Sriramulu undertook a hunger strike for 58 days in an attempt to achieve the formation of a separate state, to be known as Andhra State. His death on December 15 became instrumental in the linguistic re-organisation of states.

He is revered as Amarajeevi (Immortal being) in Coastal Andra for his role in achieving the linguistic re-organisation of states. As a devout follower of Mahatma Gandhi, he worked for much of his life to uphold principles such as truth, non-violence and patriotism, as well as causes such as Harijan movement to end the traditional alienation of, and accord respect and humane treatment to those traditionally called "untouchables" in Indian society.

=== Cuban dissidents ===
On April 3, 1972, Pedro Luis Boitel, an imprisoned poet and dissident, declared himself on hunger strike. After 53 days on hunger strike, receiving only liquids, he died of starvation on May 25, 1972. His last days were related by his close friend, poet Armando Valladares. He was buried in an unmarked grave in the Colón Cemetery in Havana.

Guillermo Fariñas did a seven-month hunger strike to protest against the extensive Internet censorship in Cuba. He ended it in Autumn 2006, with severe health problems although still conscious. Reporters Without Borders awarded its cyber-freedom prize to Guillermo Fariñas in 2006.

Jorge Luis García Pérez (known as Antúnez) has done hunger strikes. In 2009, following the end of his 17-year imprisonment, Antúnez, his wife Iris, and Diosiris Santana Pérez started a hunger strike to support other political prisoners. Leaders from Uruguay, Costa Rica, and Argentina declared their support for Antúnez.

On February 23, 2010, Orlando Zapata, a dissident arrested in 2003 as part of a crackdown on opposition groups, died in a hospital while undertaking a hunger strike that had been ongoing for 85 days. His hunger strike was a protest against poor prison conditions. Amnesty International had declared him a prisoner of conscience.

=== Turkey ===
Hunger strikes have been a regular tactic of organized Kurdish prisoners since at least 1982, many of which held in the notorious Diyarbakır Prison, which has been described as using methods of torture 'much like those used by the Gestapo'. In the wake of the self immolation of fellow prisoners, including a leading figure of the movement, Mazlum Doğan, a group of four militant prisoners, among them Kurdistan Workers' Party (PKK) co-leaders Kemal Pir and Mehmet Hayri Durmuş, started on July the 14th what they described as a 'death fast', their protests of the torture and inhumane conditions in the prison echoed that of their immolated comrades. The group died as a consequence of their hunger strike through the month of September. July 14 has since become marked by those affiliated to the PKK and Kurdish Freedom Movement as "July 14 Commemoration Day". Of the thirty-four prisoners who died in Diyarbakir Prison during the period between 1980 and 1984 seven died whilst conducting hunger strikes.

== Legal situation ==
Article 8 of the 1975 World Medical Association Declaration of Tokyo states that doctors are not allowed to force-feed hunger strikers. They are supposed to understand the prisoner's independent wishes, and it is recommended to have a second opinion as to the capability of the prisoner to understand the implication of their decision and be capable of informed consent.

Where a prisoner refuses nourishment and is considered by the physician as capable of forming an unimpaired and rational judgement concerning the consequences of such a voluntary refusal of nourishment, they shall not be fed artificially. The decision as to the capacity of the prisoner to form such a judgement should be confirmed by at least one other independent physician. The consequences of the refusal of nourishment shall be explained by the physician to the prisoner.

The World Medical Association (WMA) revised and updated its Declaration of Malta on Hunger Strikers in 2017. Among many changes, it unambiguously states that force feeding is a form of inhumane and degrading treatment in its Article 21.

The American Medical Association (AMA) is a member of the WMA, but the AMA's members are not bound by the WMA's decisions, as neither organization has formal legal powers. The AMA has formally endorsed the WMA Declaration of Tokyo and has written several letters to the US government and made public statements in opposition to US physician involvement in force feeding of hunger strikers in contravention of medical ethics. The United States Code of Federal Regulations rule on hunger strikes by prisoners states, "It is the responsibility of the Bureau of Prisons to monitor the health and welfare of individual inmates, and to ensure that procedures are pursued to preserve life." It further provides that when "a medical necessity for immediate treatment of a life or health threatening situation exists, the physician may order that treatment be administered without the consent of the inmate." This contention between biomedical ethics and prison rules frequently plays out in American courts, which historically treat hunger strikes as medical suicide rather than political free speech or social protest. The Supreme Court decision in Cruzan v. Director, Missouri Department of Health granted citizens the constitutional right to refuse unwanted medical care. Despite this, state courts often rule that a prisoner's right to bodily autonomy is legally overriden by the government's interest in maintaining discipline within the prisons.

== See also ==
- List of hunger strikes
