= Andy O'Sullivan =

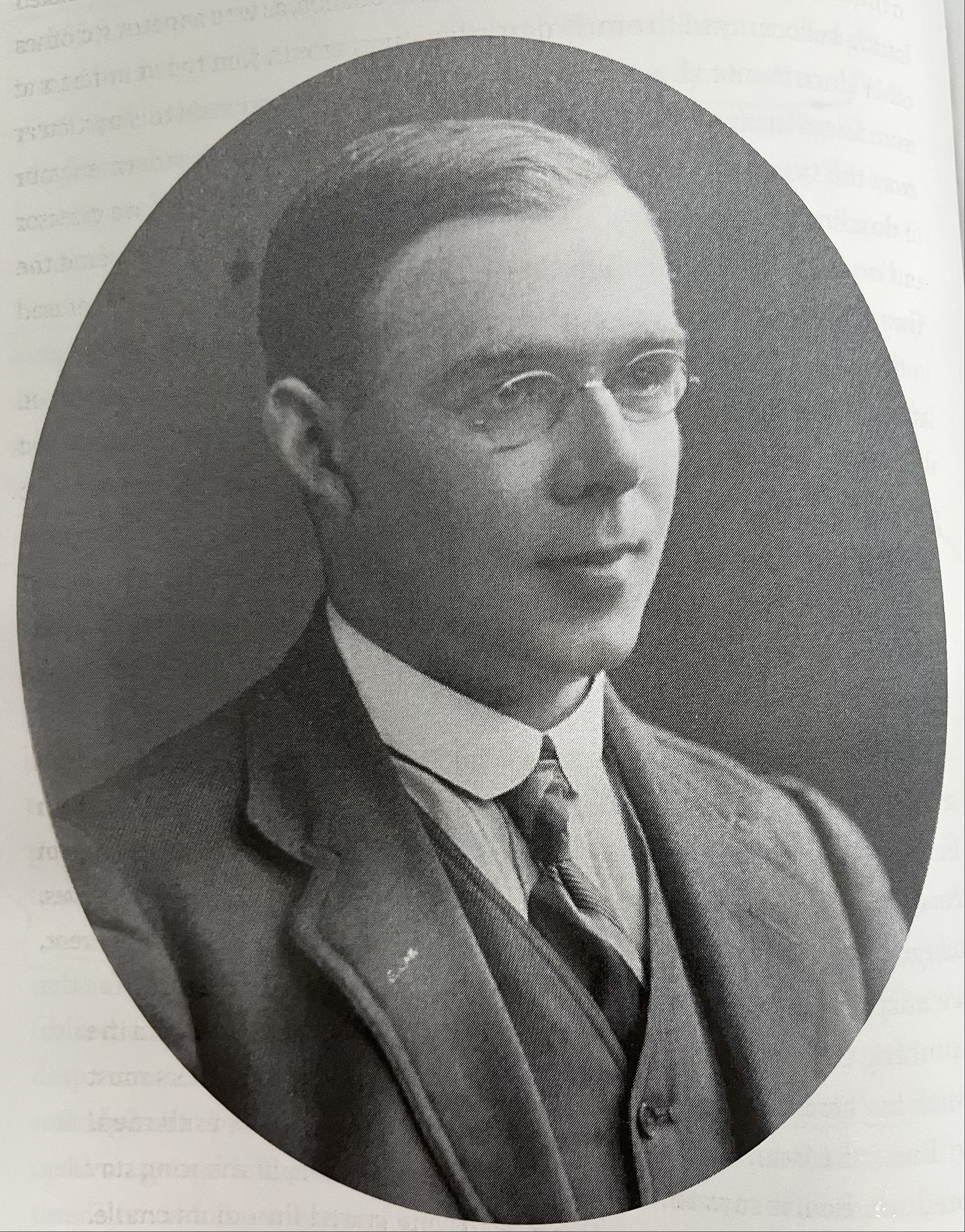
Andrew Sullivan ( 1882-1923) of Denbawn, Co. Cavan. Agricultural Inspector for North Cork, member of Irish Volunteers/ I.R.A. Intelligence Unit in Mallow, Co. Cork

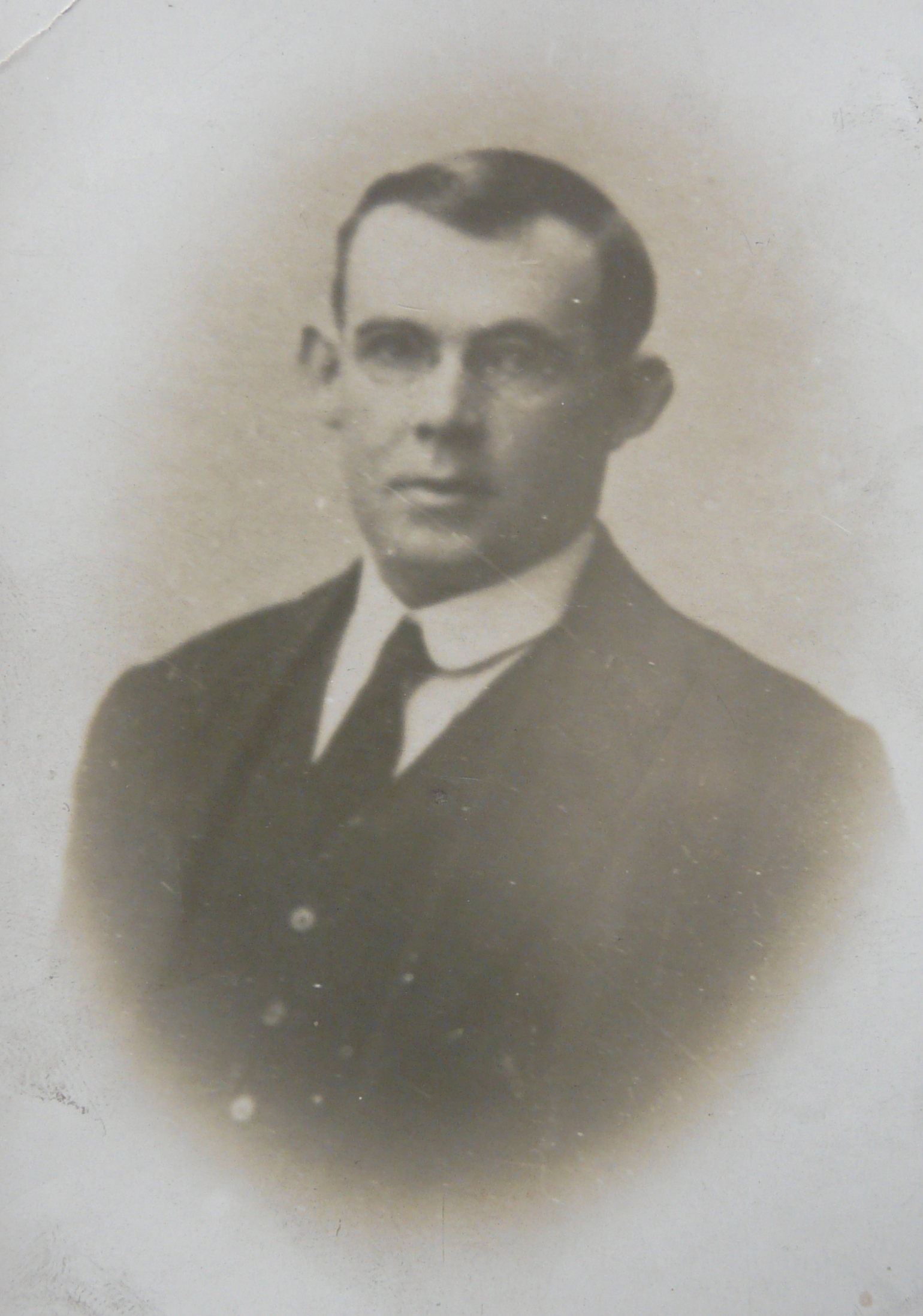
Andy O'Sullivan

Andy O'Sullivan (died 23 November 1923) was an Irish militant and Republican activist who was an intelligence officer and regional leader in the Irish Republican Army. He died during the 1923 Irish hunger strikes while in prison.

== Background ==
O'Sullivan was a member of the Irish Republican Army (IRA) and was one of three IRA men to die on hunger strike in 1923. IRA Volunteers Joseph Whitty from Wexford died on 2 September 1923 and Denny Barry from Cork died on 20 November 1923 in the Curragh Camp hospital. O'Sullivan died as a result of hunger on 22 November 1923 in Mountjoy Prison. Whitty, Barry and O'Sullivan were three of the 22 Irish Republicans (in the 20th century) who died on hunger strike.

O'Sullivan was born in Denbawn, County Cavan in 1882, the eldest of eight children. His father Michael Sorohan emigrated to the United States but returned to take over the family farm. Andy worked on the family farm but won a scholarship provided by the local paper The Anglo-Celt, to Monaghan Agricultural College. From there he won another scholarship to the Royal Albert College in Dublin and attended the college as a full time student from 1907 - 1909. He graduated as one of the top students in his year and was also elected head of the student union, the highest elected position in the college. In addition he was secretary of the college hurling team which was undefeated after 14 games in 1909.

In 1909 O'Sullivan got a job as an agricultural instructor in Mallow area of Cork. In addition to educating and advising local farmers on crops and new techniques, he also judged local agricultural shows.

== Arrest, internment, hunger strike and death ==
O'Sullivan was a captain in the IRA in the intelligence unit during the Irish War of Independence. He began his intelligence activities in 1917 using the code name W.N - the last 2 letters of first and last name.

During the Civil War O'Sullivan was officer commanding (OC) Administration in the North Cork area and later in the IRA's 1st Southern Cork Division, where he had been appointed by Liam Lynch. O'Sullivan dedicated his life to the establishment of an Irish Republic: "His ideal and his goal was a Republic, and he went straight ahead working to achieve it. Nothing else bothered him." After the signing of the 1921 Anglo-Irish Treaty, he joined the anti-treaty side during the Irish Civil War.

During the Civil War, O'Sullivan was arrested by Free State forces and interned in Mountjoy Prison. In 1923, (after the end of the war) thousands of interned Irish republicans protested being held without trial, poor prison conditions and being treated as convicts rather than political prisoners. On 13 October 1923, Michael Kilroy, the OC of IRA prisoners in Mountjoy Prison, announced that 300 men would go on hunger strike. This action started the 1923 Irish hunger strikes. Within days, thousands of Irish republican prisoners were on hunger strike in multiple prisons/internment camps across Ireland. The mass hunger strike of 1923 started at midnight on 14 October 1923. Previously, the Free State government had passed a motion outlawing the release of prisoners on hunger strike. However, because of the large numbers of Republicans on strike, at the end of October, the Government sent a delegation to speak with the IRA leadership. On 23 November 1923, the 41-day hunger strike was called off (O'Sullivan had died the previous day), setting in motion a release program for many of the prisoners. However, some were not released until as late as 1932.

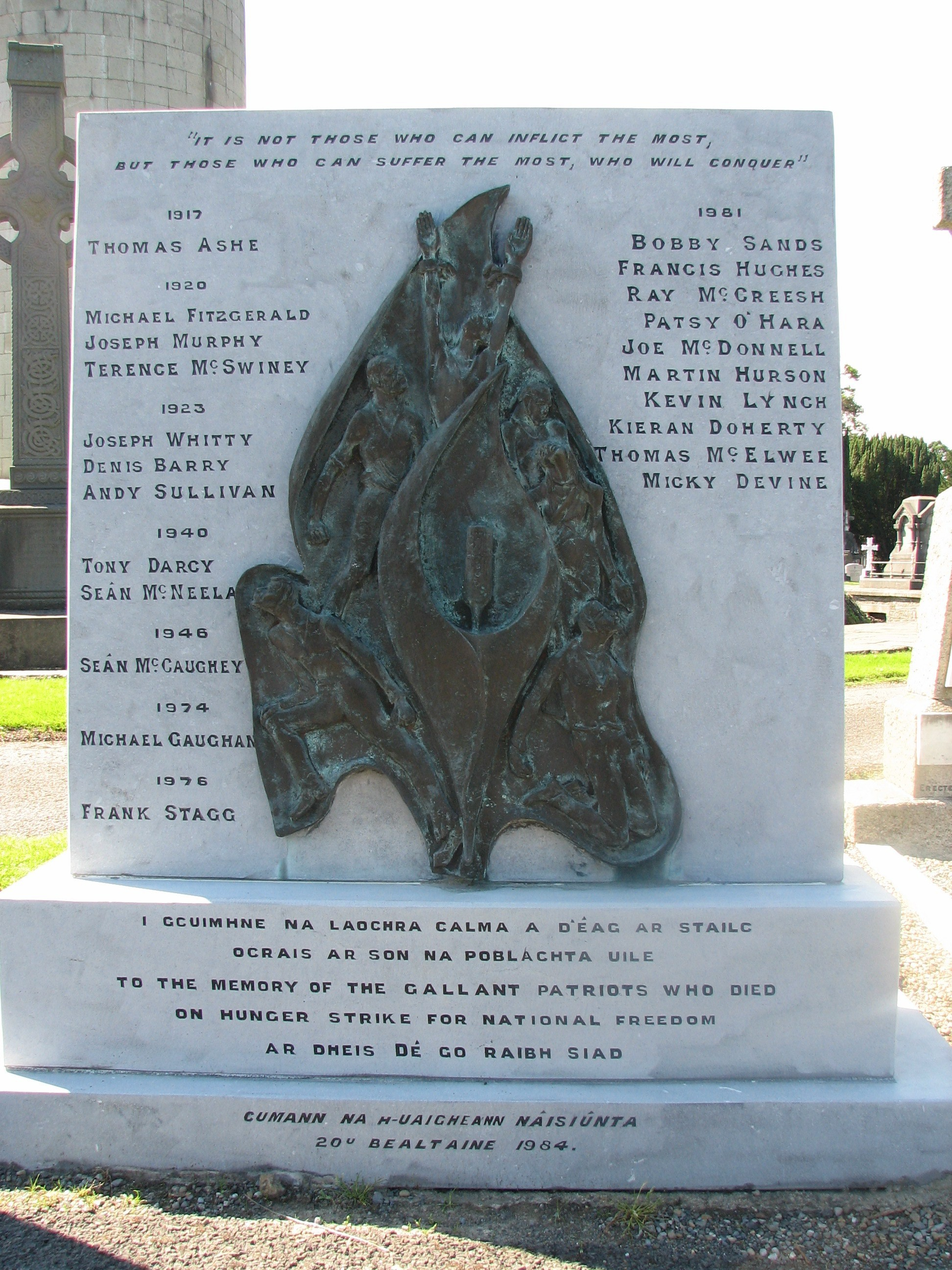
Memorial to the 22 Hunger Strikers in Dublin's Glasnevin Cemetery

Andy O'Sullivan died on 23 November 1923 (after 40 days on hunger strike) at age 41 in St. Bricin's Military Hospital, Dublin. He was buried in Saint Gobnaits Cemetery, Goulds Hill, Mallow, Cork on 27 November 1923; his funeral cortège was reported to be a mile in length.

O'Sullivan's name is commemorated on a statue that stands outside Cavan Courthouse.
