= Joseph Whitty =

Irish Republican hunger striker (d. 1923)

Joe Whitty

Michael Joseph Whitty (7 January 1904 – 2 August 1923) was an Irish militant and Republican activist who was the youngest (at 19 years of age) of the 22 Irish republicans who died while on hunger strike in the 20th century. Whitty was one of four Irish Republicans to die during the 1923 Irish hunger strikes. Decades after his death another Volunteer (Kieran Doherty) also died on 2 August during the 1981 Irish hunger strike. Volunteer (Irish republican) Whitty fought with the IRA in the Irish War of Independence, on the Anti-Treaty side in the Irish Civil War and died while under internment by the Irish Free State government.

== Background, IRA membership, arrest and internment ==
Whitty was born in 1904 in Newbawn, Wexford, Ireland. He was a Volunteer (Irish republican) in the Irish Republican Army (IRA), who served in the South Wexford Brigade of the IRA during the Irish War of Independence (1919 to 1921) and after the signing of the 1921 Anglo-Irish Treaty he joined the anti treaty side in the Irish Civil War.

In late October 1922 Whitty was arrested (he was never charged or convicted of any crime) in a round up of dissidents and was interned by Irish Free State troops initially at Wexford Gaol and from there was transferred to the Curragh Camp. It has been asserted that Whitty was arrested in revenge for the actions of his brothers who were deeply involved with the IRA. The authorities were unable to locate Whitty's brothers so Joe was arrested instead.

== Independent hunger strike, death and news embargo ==
While at the Curragh Camp, Whitty decided to independently start a hunger strike and died as a result on 2 August 1923 at the Curragh Camp hospital. At that time hunger strikes were not an official policy of the IRA and were not directed by its General Headquarters. Instead, each hunger striker made an individual decision to strike. Due to the newly formed Irish Free State government's news embargo on conditions in prisons at that time, very little was published on Whitty's motivations and the circumstances of his hunger strike and death (including the number of days of his strike).

Earlier, high-profile hunger strike deaths – Thomas Ashe, President of the Irish Republican Brotherhood in 1917 and Terence MacSwiney, Lord Mayor of Cork in 1920 – brought international attention to the Republicans’ cause. The Irish Government's news embargo prevented the embarrassment of having to publicly announce the death (by hunger strike) of an 18-year-old internee. "From 1922 hunger strikes were of value only when a Government was likely to be embarrassed sufficiently by the death of a prisoner."

With the ending of the 1923 Irish Hunger Strikes in late November 1923, the news embargo was relaxed. The late November 1923 deaths of Denny Barry from County Cork (20 November 1923) and Andy O'Sullivan from County Cavan (23 November 1923) were widely reported in the media, while Whitty's earlier death (August 1923) remained largely unreported.

== Mass hunger strikes ==
After Whitty's non-sanctioned hunger strike and death, Michael Kilroy, the Officer Commanding (OC) IRA prisoners in Mountjoy Prison announced that 300 men would go on hunger strike (on 13 October 1923). By late 1923, thousands of Irish republican prisoners were on hunger strike in multiple prisons/internment camps across Ireland. The mass hunger strikes of October/November 1923 saw around 8,000 of the 12,000 republican prisoners (opposed to the 1921 Anglo-Irish Treaty) on hunger strikes in Irish prisons, protesting internment without charge/trial, poor prison conditions and demanding immediate release of all political prisoners. Previously, the Irish Free State government had passed a motion outlawing the release of prisoners on hunger strike.

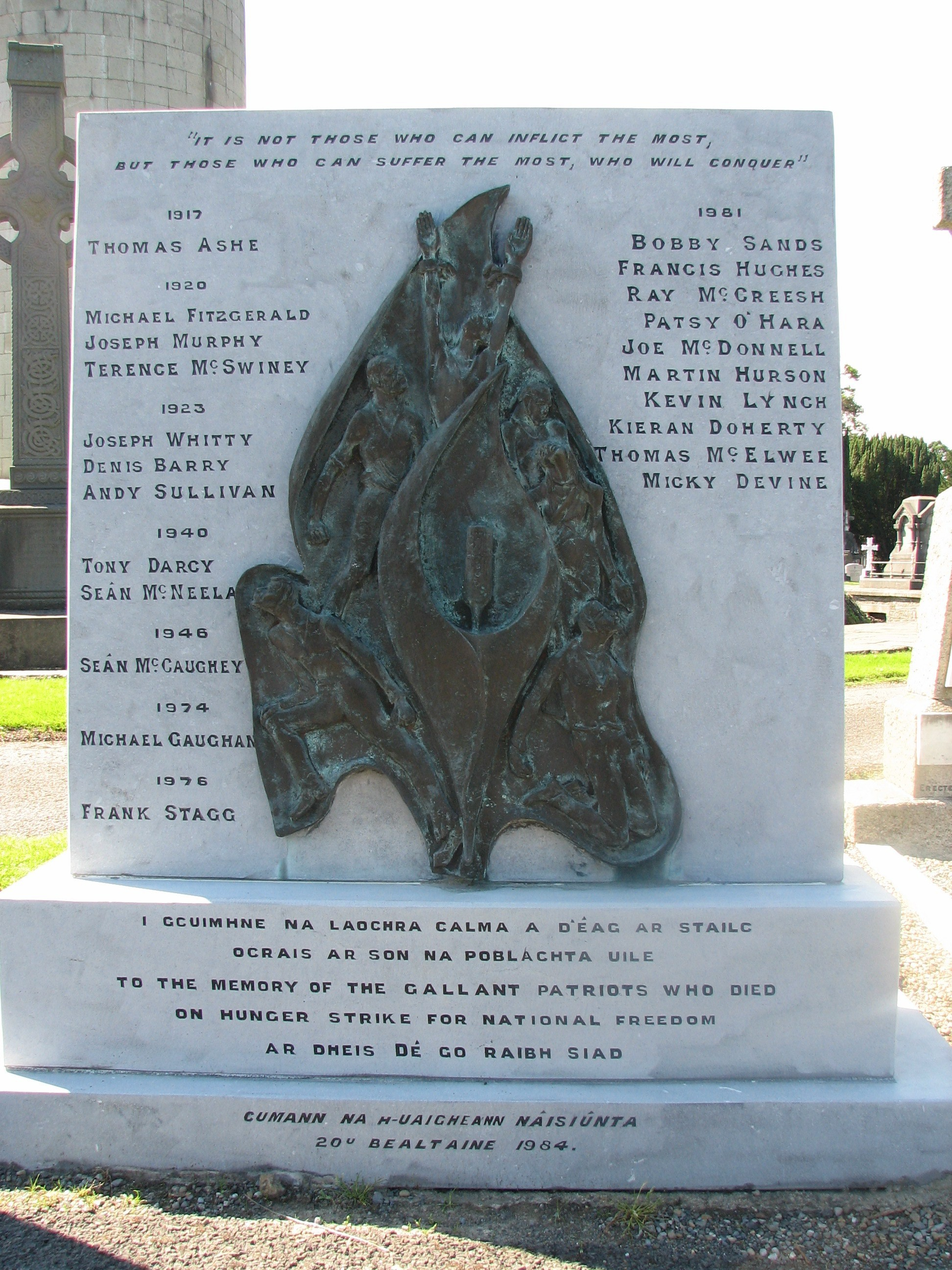
Hunger Strike Memorial in Dublin's Glasnevin Cemetery

With the large numbers of Irish republican prisoners on hunger strike, at the end of October 1923 the Irish Free State Government sent a delegation to speak with IRA leadership. On 23 November 1923 the hunger strike was called off (O'Sullivan had died the previous day) eventually setting off a release program for many of the prisoners, but some were not released until as late as 1932. The mass hunger strike of 1923 lasted for 41 days and "met with little success".

== Burial and annual commemoration ==
Michael Joseph Whitty is buried at Ballymore Cemetery Killinick, County Wexford, Ireland. The inscription on his grave reads: "In Memory of Joseph Whitty, Connolly St, Wexford. South Wexford Brigade who died for Ireland 2nd August 1923".

The Sinn Féin Cumann (Association) in Wexford Town is partly named after Joe Whitty. The annual Joe Whitty Commemoration is held each year on Holy Saturday evening in Ballymore, County Wexford.
