= Irish Civil War =

1922–1923 conflict between factions of the IRA

Irish civil war
- Part of the Irish revolutionary period
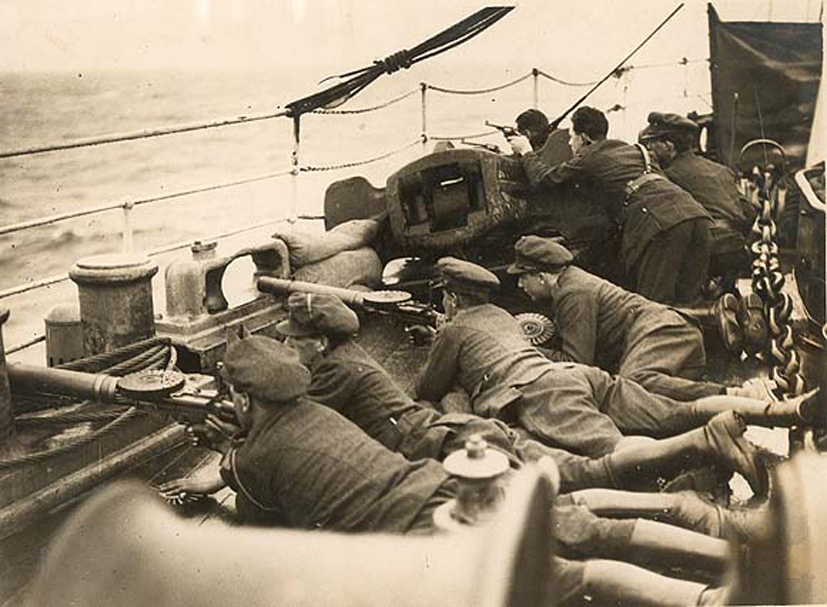
- National Army soldiers armed with Lewis machine guns aboard a troop transport during the Civil War
Date	28 June 1922 – 24 May 1923 (10 months, 3 weeks and 5 days)
Location	Irish Free State
Result	Pro-Treaty victory
Territorial changes	Consolidation of the Irish Free State

Belligerents
Irish Free State (pro-Treaty forces)	Munster Republic; Anti-Treaty IRA (anti-Treaty forces)

Commanders and leaders
Military commanders: Michael Collins †; Richard Mulcahy; Eoin O'Duffy; Political leaders: Arthur Griffith #; W. T. Cosgrave; Kevin O'Higgins	Military commanders: Liam Lynch †; Frank Aiken; Ernie O'Malley; Political leaders: Éamon de Valera

Units involved
National Army; CID (including the Citizens' Defence Force); Civic Guards	Anti-Treaty IRA (officially termed the Irregulars) (Note: The term "Irregulars" was first coined by Piaras Béaslaí and made compulsory for newspapers by Béaslaí as the Director of Communications of the Free State.); Partly involved: Cumann na mBan; Fianna Éireann; Irish Citizen Army; Irish Republican Police

Strength
National Army: c. 55,000 soldiers and 3,500 officers by end of the war; Air Service: 10 planes; CID: 350	c. 15,000

Casualties and losses
637+	426+ killed
- Civilians: 336 killed

The Irish Civil War (Irish: Cogadh Cathartha na hÉireann; 28 June 1922 – 24 May 1923) was a conflict that followed the Irish War of Independence and accompanied the establishment of the Irish Free State, an entity independent from the United Kingdom but within the British Empire.

The civil war was waged between the Provisional Government of Ireland and the Anti-Treaty IRA over the Anglo-Irish Treaty. The Provisional Government (which became the Free State in December 1922) supported the terms of the treaty, while the anti-Treaty opposition saw it as a betrayal of the Irish Republic proclaimed during the Easter Rising of 1916. Many of the combatants had fought together against the British in the Irish Republican Army during the War of Independence and had divided after that conflict ended and the treaty negotiations began.

The Civil War was won by the pro-treaty National Army, who first secured Dublin by early July, then went on the offensive against the anti-Treaty strongholds of the south and west, especially the 'Munster Republic'. All urban centres had been captured by the National Army by late August. The guerrilla phase of the Irish Civil War lasted another 10 months, before the IRA leadership issued a "dump arms" order to all units, effectively ending the conflict. The National Army benefited from substantial quantities of weapons provided by the British government, particularly artillery and armoured cars.

The conflict left Irish society divided and embittered for generations. Today, the three largest political parties in Ireland are direct descendants of the opposing sides in the war: Fine Gael, from the supporters of the pro-Treaty side; Fianna Fáil, the party formed from the bulk of the anti-Treaty republicans by Éamon de Valera; and Sinn Féin, comprising the minority of anti-Treaty republicans who refused to join any partitionist party.

== Background ==
=== Fallout of the Anglo-Irish Treaty ===
The Anglo-Irish Treaty was agreed upon to end the 1919–1921 Irish War of Independence between the Irish Republic and the United Kingdom of Great Britain and Ireland. The treaty provided for a self-governing Irish state, having its own army and police. The treaty also allowed Northern Ireland (the six north-eastern counties – Fermanagh, Antrim, Tyrone, Derry, Armagh and Down – where collectively the majority population was of the Protestant religion) to opt out of the new state and return to the United Kingdom – which it did immediately. With the Partition of Ireland a two-year period of communal conflict took place within the newly formed Northern Ireland. Rather than creating the independent republic for which nationalists had fought, the Irish Free State would be a dominion of the British Empire with the British monarch as head of state, in the same manner as Canada and Australia. The British suggested dominion status in secret correspondence even before treaty negotiations began, but Sinn Féin leader Éamon de Valera rejected the dominion. The treaty also stipulated that members of the new Irish Oireachtas (parliament) would have to take the following "Oath of Allegiance":

I... do solemnly swear true faith and allegiance to the Constitution of the Irish Free State as by law established, and that I will be faithful to His Majesty King George V, his heirs and successors by law in virtue of the common citizenship of Ireland with Great Britain and her adherence to and membership of the group of nations forming the British Commonwealth of nations.

This oath was highly objectionable to many Irish Republicans. Furthermore, the partition of Ireland, which had already been decided by the Westminster parliament in the Government of Ireland Act 1920, was effectively confirmed in the Anglo-Irish treaty. The most contentious areas of the Treaty for the IRA were the disestablishment of the Irish Republic declared in 1919, the abandonment of the First Dáil, the status of the Irish Free State as a dominion in the British Commonwealth and the British retention of the strategic Treaty Ports on Ireland's south western and north western coasts which were to remain occupied by the Royal Navy. All these issues were the cause of a split in the IRA and ultimately civil war.

Michael Collins, the Irish finance minister and Irish Republican Brotherhood (IRB) president, argued in the Dáil Éireann that the treaty gave "not the ultimate freedom that all nations aspire and develop, but the freedom to achieve freedom". However, those against the treaty believed that it would never deliver full Irish independence.

=== Split in the Nationalist movement ===
The split over the Treaty was deeply personal. Many on both sides had been close friends and comrades during the War of Independence. This made their disagreement all the more bitter. On 6 January 1922, at the Mansion House, Dublin, Austin Stack, Home Affairs minister, showed president de Valera the evening news announcing the signing of the Treaty: de Valera merely glanced at it; when Eamonn Duggan, part of the returning Irish delegation, handed him an envelope confirming it, he pushed it aside. De Valera had held secret discussions with UK Prime Minister David Lloyd George from 14 to 21 July in London. Collins, also part of the delegation, supposed (with others) that these discussions confirmed the earlier correspondence, i.e. no British acceptance of a Republic. De Valera, Stack and Defence minister Cathal Brugha had then all refused to join the delegation to London. Collins wrote that his inclusion as a plenipotentiary was "a trap" of de Valera's which he was forewarned of, argued against, but walked into anyway, "as a soldier obeying his commanding officer." Arthur Griffith, the delegation chairman, had made a similar comment about obeying orders to de Valera himself. Mutual suspicion and confusion pertained; the delegation was unclear about the cabinet's instructions and individually became burdened to the point of breakdown. Collins expected the blame for the compromise within the Treaty and wrote: "Early this morning I signed my death warrant." Notwithstanding this, he was frustrated and at times emotional when de Valera and others refused to support the Treaty and friendships died.

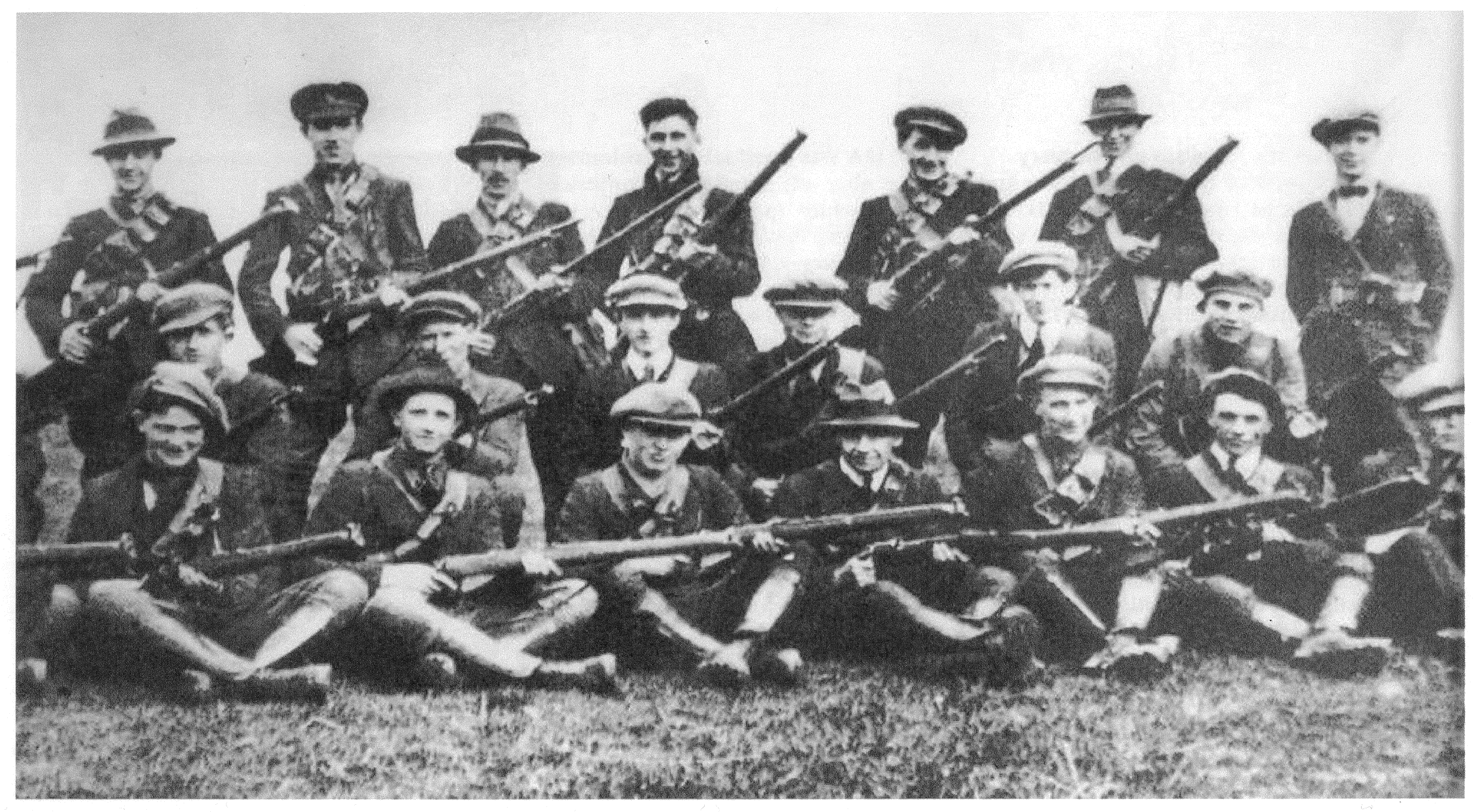
Third Tipperary Brigade Flying Column No. 2 under Seán Hogan during the War of Independence. Most of the IRA units in Munster were against the treaty.

Dáil Éireann (the parliament of the Irish Republic) narrowly passed the Anglo-Irish Treaty by 64 votes to 57 on 7 January 1922. Following the Treaty's ratification, in accordance with article 17 of the Treaty, the British-recognised Provisional Government of the Irish Free State was established. Its authority under the Treaty was to provide a "provisional arrangement for the administration of Southern Ireland during the interval" before the establishment of the Irish Free State. In accordance with the Treaty, the British Government transferred "the powers and machinery requisite for the discharge of its duties". Before the British Government transferred such powers, the members of the Provisional Government each "signified in writing [their] acceptance of [the Treaty]".

Upon the Treaty's ratification, de Valera resigned as President of the Republic and failed to be re-elected by an even closer vote of 60–58. He challenged the right of the Dáil to approve the treaty, saying that its members were breaking their oath to the Irish Republic. Meanwhile, he continued to promote a compromise whereby the new Irish Free State would be in "external association" with the British Commonwealth rather than be a member of it (the inclusion of republics within the Commonwealth of Nations was not formally implemented until 1949).

In early March, de Valera formed the Cumann na Poblachta ('Republican Association') party while remaining a member of Sinn Féin, and commenced a speaking tour of the more republican province of Munster on 17 March 1922. During the tour he made controversial speeches at Carrick on Suir, Lismore, Dungarvan and Waterford, saying at one point, "If the Treaty were accepted, the fight for freedom would still go on, and the Irish people, instead of fighting foreign soldiers, will have to fight the Irish soldiers of an Irish government set up by Irishmen." At Thurles several days later he repeated this imagery, and added that the IRA "would have to wade through the blood of the soldiers of the Irish Government, and perhaps through that of some members of the Irish Government to get their freedom."

In a letter to the Irish Independent on 23 March, de Valera accepted the accuracy of their report of his comment about "wading" through blood, but deplored that the newspaper had published it.

More seriously, many Irish Republican Army (IRA) officers were also against the treaty, and in March 1922 an ad hoc Army Convention repudiated the authority of the Dáil to accept the treaty. In contrast, the Minister of Defence, Richard Mulcahy, stated in the Dáil on 28 April that conditions in Dublin had prevented a Convention from being held, but that delegates had been selected and voted by ballot to accept the Oath. The anti-Treaty IRA formed their own "Army Executive", which they declared to be the real government of the country, despite the result of the 1921 general election. On 26 April Mulcahy summarised alleged illegal activities by many IRA men over the previous three months, whom he described as 'seceding volunteers', including hundreds of robberies. Yet this fragmenting army was the only police force on the ground following the disintegration of the Irish Republican Police and the disbanding of the Royal Irish Constabulary (RIC).

By putting ten questions to Mulcahy on 28 April, Seán MacEntee argued that the Army Executive had acted continuously on its own to create a republic since 1917, had an unaltered constitution, had never fallen under the control of the Dáil, and that "the only body competent to dissolve the Volunteer Executive was a duly convened convention of the Irish Republican Army" – not the Dáil. By accepting the treaty in January and abandoning the republic, the Dáil majority had effectively deserted the Army Executive. In his reply, Mulcahy rejected this interpretation. Then, in a debate on defence, MacEntee suggested that supporting the Army Executive "even if it meant the scrapping of the Treaty and terrible and immediate war with England, would be better than the civil war which we are beginning at present apparently". MacEntee's supporters added that the many robberies complained of by Mulcahy on 26 April were caused by the lack of payment and provision by the Dáil to the volunteers.

=== Occupation of the Four Courts ===
On 14 April 1922, 200 Anti-Treaty IRA militants, with Rory O'Connor as their spokesman, occupied the Four Courts and several other buildings in central Dublin, resulting in a tense stand-off. These anti-treaty Republicans wanted to spark a new armed confrontation with the British, which they hoped would unite the two factions of the IRA against their common enemy. However, for those who were determined to make the Free State into a viable, self-governing Irish state, this was an act of rebellion that would have to be put down by them rather than the British.

Arthur Griffith was in favour of using force against these men immediately, but Michael Collins, who wanted at all costs to avoid civil war, left the Four Courts garrison alone until late June 1922. By this point, the Pro-Treaty Sinn Féin party had secured a large majority in the general election, along with other parties that supported the Treaty. Collins was also coming under continuing pressure from London to assert his government's authority in Dublin.

=== Delay until the June election ===
Collins established an "army re-unification committee" to re-unite the IRA and organised an election pact with de Valera's anti-treaty political followers to campaign jointly in the Free State's first election in 1922 and form a coalition government afterwards. He also tried to reach a compromise with anti-treaty IRA leaders by agreeing to a republican-type constitution (with no mention of the British monarchy) for the new state. IRA leaders such as Liam Lynch were prepared to accept this compromise. However, the proposal for a republican constitution was vetoed by the British as being contrary to the terms of the treaty and they threatened military intervention in the Free State unless the treaty were fully implemented. Collins reluctantly agreed. This completely undermined the electoral pact between the pro- and anti-treaty factions, who went into the Irish general election on 16 June 1922 as hostile parties in some constituencies, both calling themselves Sinn Féin.

The Pro-Treaty Sinn Féin party claimed the election with 239,193 votes to 133,864 for Anti-Treaty Sinn Féin. A further 247,226 people voted for other parties, most of whom supported the Treaty. Labour's 132,570 votes were ambiguous with regard to the Treaty. According to Hopkinson, "Irish labour and union leaders, while generally pro-Treaty, made little attempt to lead opinion during the Treaty conflict, casting themselves rather as attempted peacemakers." The election showed that a majority of the Irish electorate accepted the treaty and the foundation of the Irish Free State, but de Valera, his political followers and most of the IRA continued to oppose the treaty. De Valera is quoted as saying, "the majority have no right to do wrong". From the anti-treaty perspective the election was held under the British threat of a war of reconquest and therefore was not a free contest. In this view, the pro-treaty position expressed as republican leader Liam Mellows put it 'not the will of the people, but the fear of the people'.

Meanwhile, under the leadership of Michael Collins and Arthur Griffith, the pro-treaty Provisional Government set about establishing the Irish Free State, and organised the National Army – to replace the IRA – and a new police force. However, since it was envisaged that the new army would be built around the IRA, Anti-Treaty IRA units were allowed to take over British barracks and take their arms. In practice, this meant that by the summer of 1922, the Provisional Government of Southern Ireland controlled only Dublin and some other areas like County Longford where the IRA units supported the treaty. Fighting ultimately broke out when the Provisional Government tried to assert its authority over well-armed and intransigent Anti-Treaty IRA units around the country – particularly a hardliner group in Dublin.

=== Assassination of Field Marshal Wilson ===
Field Marshal Henry Hughes Wilson, a prominent security adviser to the Prime Minister of Northern Ireland James Craig, was shot dead by IRA men on his own doorstep in London on 22 June 1922, with no responsibility for the act being publicly claimed by any IRA authority. Winston Churchill assumed that the Anti-Treaty IRA were responsible for the shooting and warned Collins that he would use British troops to attack the Four Courts unless the Provisional Government took action. In fact, the British cabinet actually resolved to attack the Four Courts themselves on 25 June, in an operation that would have involved tanks, howitzers and aeroplanes. However, on the advice of General Nevil Macready, who commanded the British garrison in Dublin, the plan was cancelled at the last minute. Macready's argument was that British involvement would have united Irish Nationalist opinion against the treaty, and instead Collins was given a last chance to clear the Four Courts himself.

== Course of the war ==
=== Fighting in Dublin ===
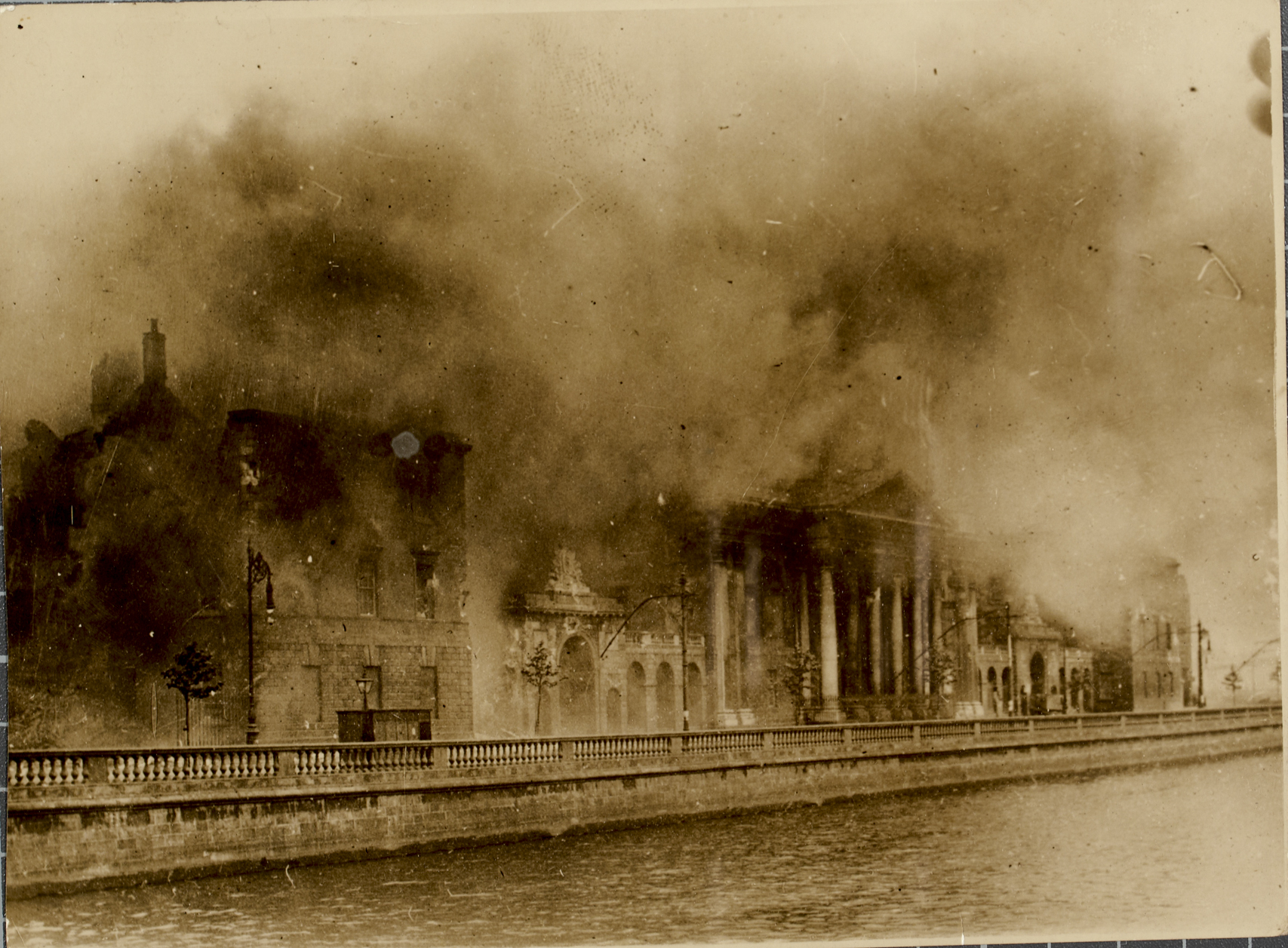
The Four Courts along the River Liffey quayside. The building was occupied by anti-treaty forces during the Civil War, whom the National Army subsequently bombarded into surrender. The Irish national archives in the buildings were destroyed in the subsequent fire. The building was badly damaged but was fully restored after the war.

On 26 June anti-treaty forces occupying the Four Courts kidnapped JJ "Ginger" O'Connell, a general in the National Army, in retaliation for the arrest of Leo Henderson. Collins, after giving the Four Courts garrison a final (and according to Ernie O'Malley, only) ultimatum to leave the building on 27 June, decided to end the stand-off by bombarding the Four Courts garrison into surrender. The government then appointed Collins as Commander-in-Chief of the National Army. This attack was not the opening shot of the war, as skirmishes had taken place between pro- and anti-treaty IRA factions throughout the country when the British were handing over the barracks. However, this represented the 'point of no return', when all-out war was effectively declared and the Civil War officially began.

Collins ordered Mulcahy to accept a British offer of two 18-pounder field artillery for use by the new army of the Free State, though General Macready gave just 200 shells of the 10,000 he had in store at Richmond barracks in Inchicore. The anti-treaty forces in the Four Courts, who possessed only small arms, surrendered after three days of bombardment and the storming of the building by Provisional Government troops (28–30 June 1922). Shortly before the surrender, a massive explosion destroyed the western wing of the complex, including the Irish Public Record Office (PRO), injuring many advancing Free State soldiers and destroying the records. Government supporters alleged that the building had been deliberately mined. Historians dispute whether the PRO was intentionally destroyed by mines laid by the Republicans on their evacuation, or whether the explosions occurred when their ammunition store was accidentally ignited by the bombardment. Coogan, however, asserts that two lorry-loads of gelignite was exploded in the PRO, leaving priceless manuscripts floating over the city for several hours afterward.

Pitched battles continued in Dublin until 5 July. IRA units from the Dublin Brigade, led by Oscar Traynor, occupied O'Connell Street – provoking a week's more street fighting and costing another 65 killed and 280 wounded. Among the dead was Republican leader Cathal Brugha, who made his last stand after exiting the Granville Hotel. In addition, the Free State took over 500 Republican prisoners. The civilian casualties are estimated to have numbered well over 250. When the fighting in Dublin died down, the Free State government was left firmly in control of the Irish capital and the anti-treaty forces dispersed around the country, mainly to the south and west.

=== The opposing forces ===
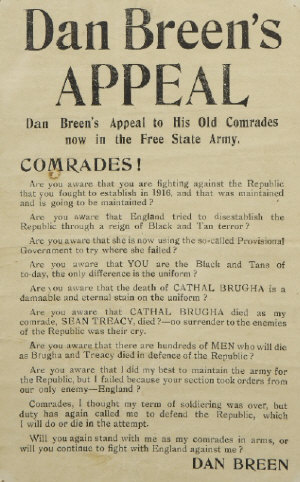
Dan Breen's appeal to Free State troops

The outbreak of the Civil War forced pro- and anti-treaty supporters to choose sides. Supporters of the treaty came to be known as "pro-treaty" or later Free State Army, legally after 1923 the National Army, and were often called "Staters" by their opponents. The latter called themselves Republicans and were also known as "anti-treaty" forces or "Irregulars", a term preferred by the Free State side. This nomenclature, however, may be confusing. The civil war was fought by republicans on both sides who disagreed on how best to achieve the republic. For example, Collins and many of his closest comrades started the war committed to the goals of the Irish Republican Brotherhood.

The Anti-Treaty IRA claimed that it was defending the Irish Republic declared in 1916 during the Easter Rising, confirmed by the First Dáil and invalidly set aside by those who accepted the compromise of the Free State. Éamon de Valera stated that he would serve as an ordinary IRA volunteer and left the leadership of the anti-treaty Republicans to Liam Lynch, the IRA Chief of Staff. De Valera, though the Republican President as of October 1922, had little control over military operations. The campaign was directed by Liam Lynch until he was killed on 10 April 1923, and then by Frank Aiken from 20 April 1923.

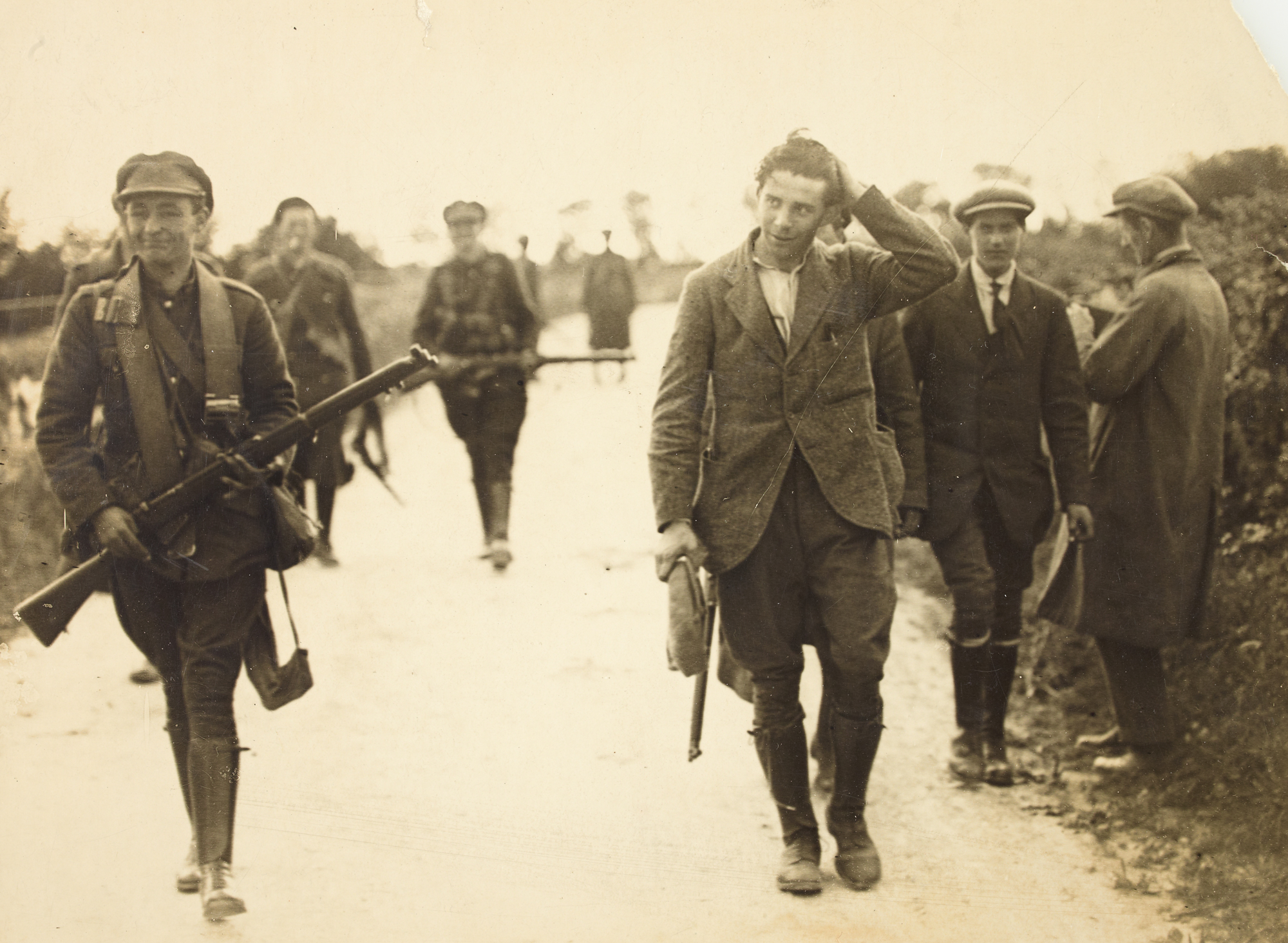
National Army soldiers escorting an IRA prisoner

The Civil War split the IRA. When the Civil War broke out, the Anti-Treaty IRA (concentrated in the south and west) outnumbered pro-Free State forces by roughly 12,000 men to 8,000. Moreover, the anti-treaty ranks included many of the IRA's most experienced guerrilla fighters. The paper strength of the IRA in early 1922 was over 72,000 men, but most of them were recruited during the truce with the British and fought in neither the War of Independence nor the Civil War. According to Richard Mulcahy's estimate, the Anti-Treaty IRA at the beginning of the war had 6,780 rifles and 12,900 men.

However, the IRA lacked an effective command structure, a clear strategy and sufficient arms. As well as rifles they had a handful of machine guns and many of their fighters were armed only with shotguns or handguns. They also took a small number of armoured cars from British troops as they were evacuating the country. Finally, they had no artillery of any kind. As a result, they were forced to adopt a defensive stance throughout the war.

By contrast, the Free State army funded by the British managed to expand its forces dramatically after the start of the war. Collins and his commanders were able to build up an army that could overwhelm their opponents in the field. British supplies of artillery, aircraft, armoured cars, machine guns, small arms and ammunition were of much help to pro-Treaty forces. The British delivered for instance, over 27,000 rifles, 250 machine guns and eight 18-pounder artillery pieces to the pro-treaty forces between the outbreak of the Civil War and September 1922. The National Army amounted to 14,000 men by August 1922, was 38,000 strong by the end of 1922, and by the end of the war had grown to 55,000 men and 3,500 officers, far in excess of what the Irish state would need to maintain in peacetime. The Free State army was able to absorb experienced soldiers from the recently disbanded Irish regiments in the British army. These soldiers provided invaluable specialist skills for the new army.

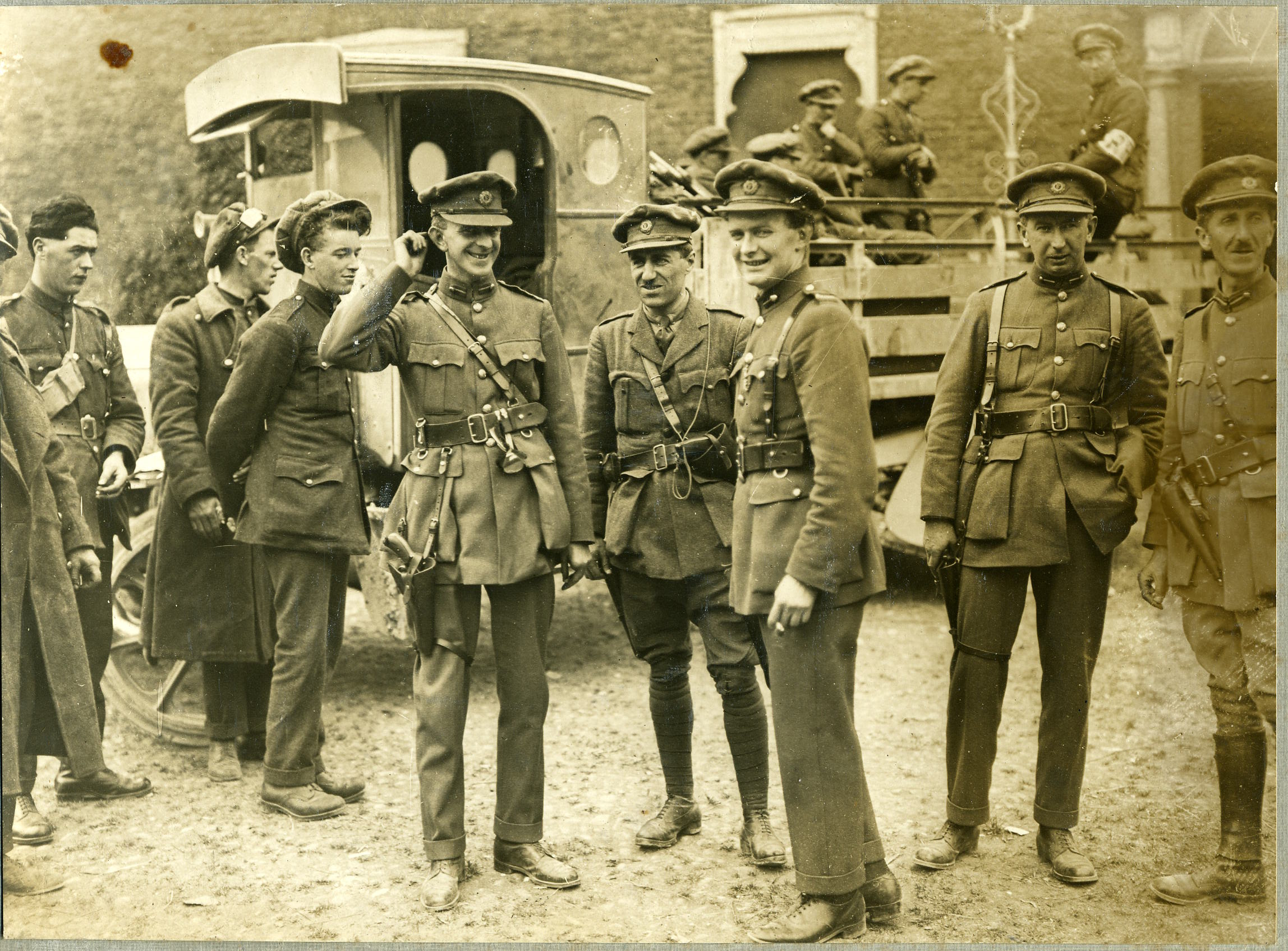
National Army soldiers during the Civil War

Like the Anti-Treaty IRA, the Free State's National Army was initially rooted in the IRA that fought against the British. Collins' most ruthless officers and men were recruited from the Dublin Active Service Unit (the elite unit of the IRA's Dublin Brigade) and from Collins' Intelligence Department and assassination unit, The Squad. In the new National Army, they were known as the Dublin Guard. Towards the end of the war, they were implicated in some notorious atrocities against anti-treaty guerrillas in County Kerry. Up to the outbreak of Civil War, it had been agreed that only men with service in the IRA could be recruited into the National Army. However, once the war began, all such restrictions were lifted. A 'National Call to Arms' issued on 7 July for recruitment on a six-month basis brought in thousands of new recruits. Many of the new army's recruits were veterans of the British Army in World War I, where they had served in disbanded Irish regiments of the British Army. Many others were raw recruits without any military experience. The fact that at least 50% of the other ranks had no military experience in turn led to ill-discipline becoming a major problem.

A major problem for the National Army was a shortage of experienced officers. At least 20% of its officers had previously served as officers in the British Army, while 50% of the rank-and-file of the National Army had served in the British Army in World War I. Former British Army officers were also recruited for their technical expertise. A number of the senior Free State commanders, such as Emmet Dalton, John T. Prout and W. R. E. Murphy, had seen service as officers in World War I, Dalton and Murphy in the British Army and Prout in the US Army. The Republicans made much use of this fact in their propaganda – claiming that the Free State was only a proxy force for Britain itself. However, the majority of Free State soldiers were raw recruits without military experience, either in World War I or the Irish War of Independence. There were also a significant number of former members of the British Armed Forces on the Republican side, including such senior figures as Tom Barry, David Robinson and Erskine Childers.

=== Free State takes major towns ===
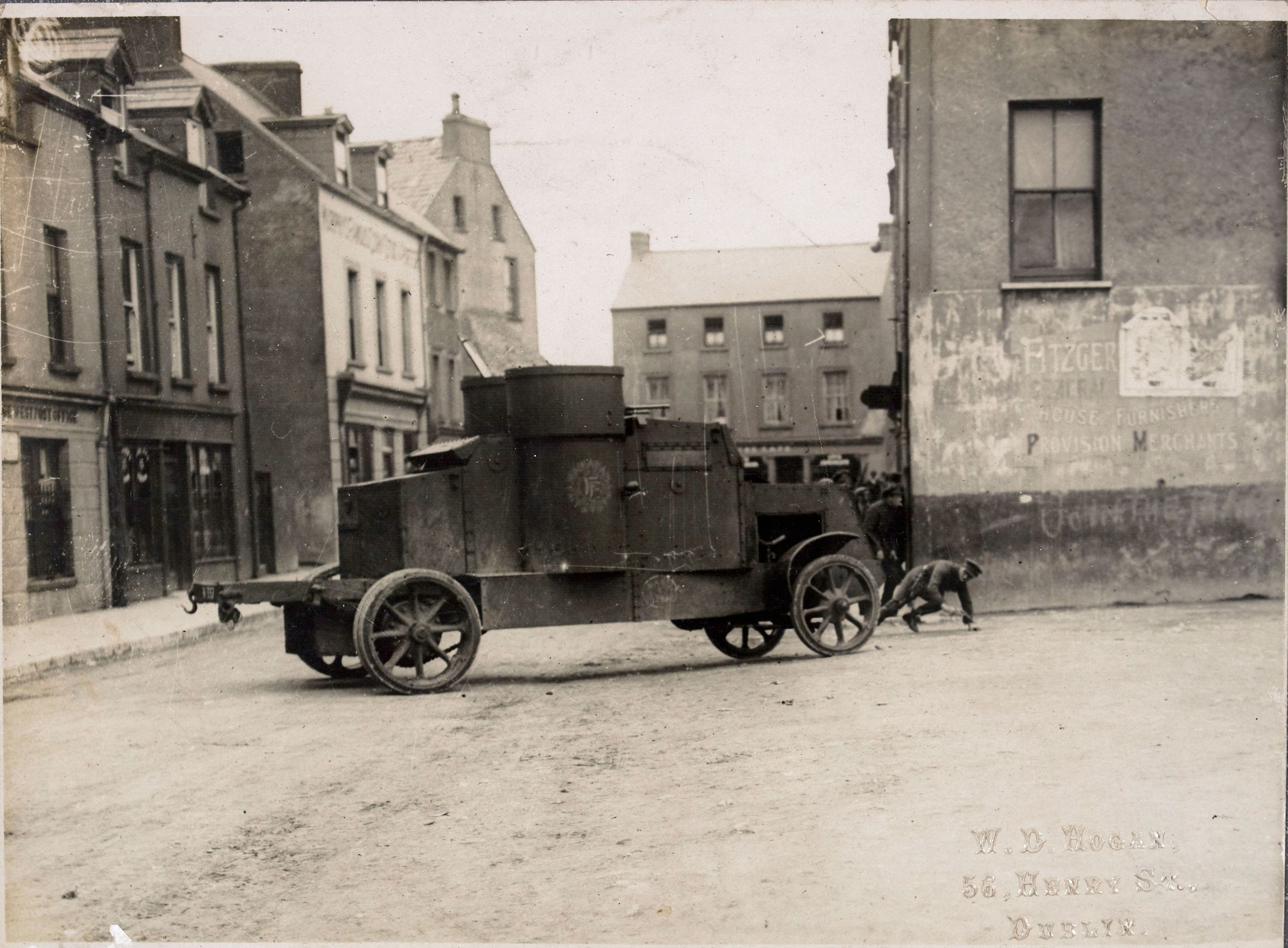
A National Army Peerless armoured car in Passage West, August 1922

With Dublin in pro-treaty hands, conflict spread throughout the country. The war started with the anti-treaty forces holding Cork, Limerick and Waterford as part of a self-styled Munster Republic. However, since the anti-treaty side were not equipped to wage conventional war, Lynch was unable to take advantage of the Republicans' initial advantage in numbers and territory held. He hoped simply to hold the Munster Republic long enough to force Britain to renegotiate the treaty.

The large towns in Ireland were all relatively easily taken by the Free State in August 1922. Collins, Richard Mulcahy and Eoin O'Duffy planned a nationwide Free State offensive, dispatching columns overland to take Limerick in the west and Waterford in the south-east and seaborne forces to take counties Cork and Kerry in the south and Mayo in the west. In the south, landings occurred at Union Hall in Cork and Fenit, the port of Tralee, in Kerry. Limerick fell on 20 July, Waterford on the same day and Cork city on 10 August after a Free State force landed by sea at Passage West. Another seaborne expedition to Mayo in the west secured government control over that part of the country. While in some places the Republicans had put up determined resistance, nowhere were they able to defeat regular forces armed with artillery and armour. The only real conventional battle during the Free State offensive, the Battle of Killmallock, was fought when Free State troops advanced south from Limerick.

=== Guerrilla war ===
Government victories in the major towns inaugurated a period of guerrilla warfare. After the fall of Cork, Lynch ordered IRA units to disperse and form flying columns as they had when fighting the British. They held out in areas such as the western part of counties Cork and Kerry in the south, county Wexford in the east and counties Sligo and Mayo in the west. Sporadic fighting also took place around Dundalk, where Frank Aiken and the Fourth Northern Division of the Irish Republican Army were based, and Dublin, where small-scale but regular attacks were mounted on Free State troops.

August and September 1922 saw widespread attacks on Free State forces in the territories that they had occupied in the July–August offensive, inflicting heavy casualties on them. Collins was killed in an ambush by anti-treaty Republicans at Béal na Bláth, near his home in County Cork, in August 1922. Collins' death increased the bitterness of the Free State leadership towards the Republicans and probably contributed to the subsequent descent of the conflict into a cycle of atrocities and reprisals. Arthur Griffith, the Free State president, had also died of a brain haemorrhage ten days before, leaving the government in the hands of W.T. Cosgrave and the Free State army under the command of General Richard Mulcahy. For a brief period, with rising casualties among its troops and its two principal leaders dead, it looked as if the Free State might collapse. However, as winter set in, the Republicans found it increasingly difficult to sustain their campaign, and casualty rates among National Army troops dropped rapidly. For instance, in County Sligo, 54 people died in the conflict, of whom all but eight had been killed by the end of September.

In the autumn and winter of 1922, Free State forces broke up many of the larger Republican guerrilla units – in Sligo, Meath and Connemara in the west, for example, and in much of Dublin city. Elsewhere, anti-treaty units were forced by lack of supplies and safe-houses to disperse into smaller groups, typically of nine to ten men. Despite these successes for the National Army, it took eight more months of intermittent warfare before the war was brought to an end.

By late 1922 and early 1923, the anti-treaty guerrilla campaign had been reduced largely to acts of sabotage and destruction of public infrastructure such as roads and railways. It was also in this period that the Anti-Treaty IRA began burning the homes of Free State Senators and of many of the Anglo-Irish landed class.

In October 1922, de Valera and the anti-treaty Teachtaí Dála (TDs) set up their own "Republican government" in opposition to the Free State. However, by then the anti-treaty side held no significant territory and de Valera's government had no authority over the population.

=== Atrocities and executions ===
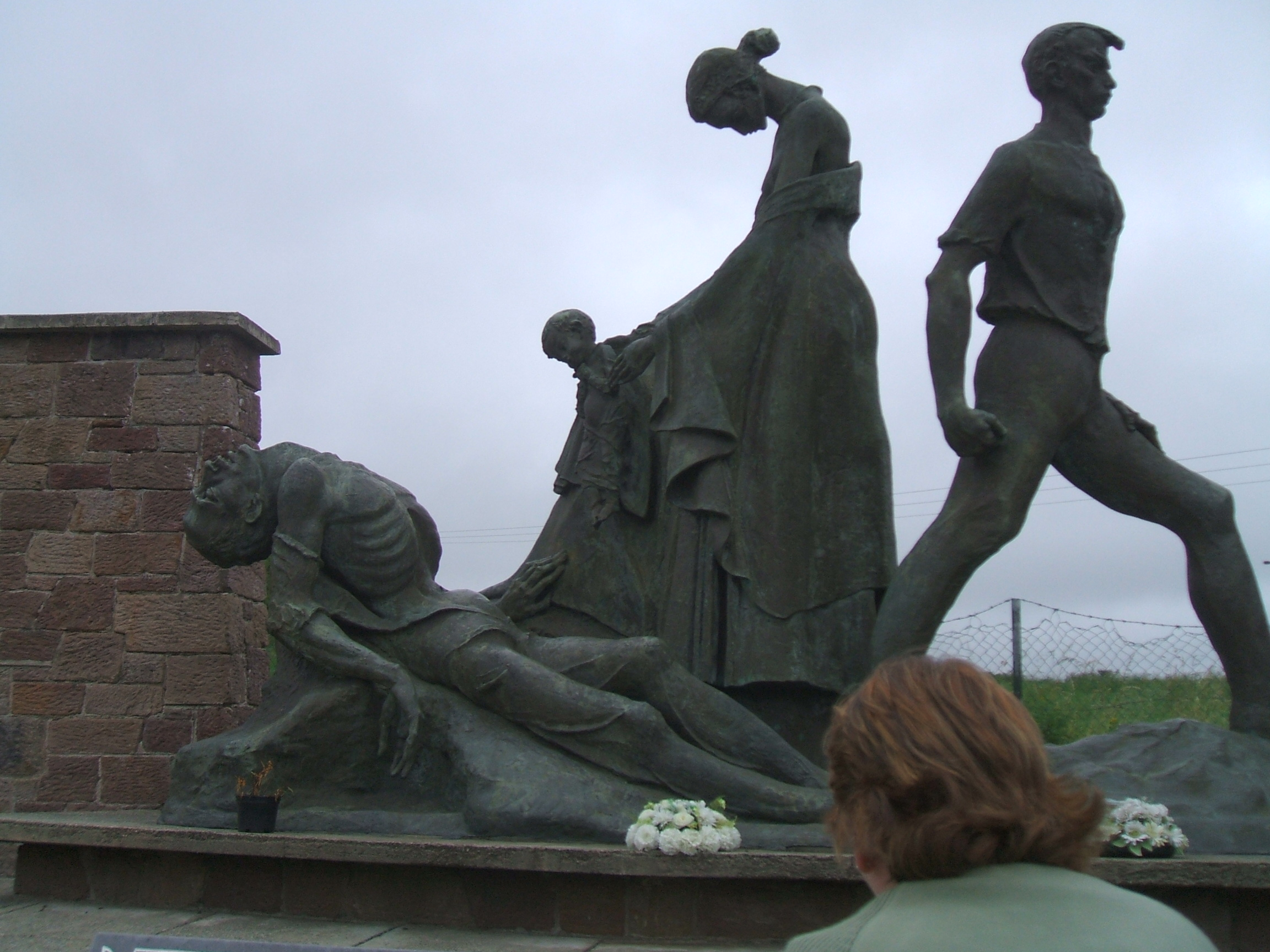
Memorial to the Republican soldiers executed by Free State forces at Ballyseedy, County Kerry, designed by Yann Goulet

On 27 September 1922, three months after the outbreak of war, the Free State's Provisional Government put before the Dáil an Army (Emergency Powers) Resolution endorsing the establishment of military courts and tribunals by the Army Council. Sometimes incorrectly referred to as the "Public Safety Bill" or "Emergency Powers Act", the Army Resolution was not law, it was a resolution passed by parliament endorsing the measures the pro-treaty army was implementing in the war under martial law since July. Consequently, "Public Safety Act" or "Emergency Powers Act" is not recorded on the Irish Statute book. These pieces of "legislation" are alone the invention of Irish historians. The fictitious "Acts" nevertheless play an important role in the Irish state's foundation myth, dividing civil war violence into bogus legal and illegal categories.

The Army Resolution recognised the military courts and tribunals established in the army to impose life imprisonment, as well as the death penalty, for 'aiding or abetting attacks' on state forces, possession of arms and ammunition or explosive 'without the proper authority' and 'looting destruction or arson'.

The final phase of the Civil War degenerated into a series of atrocities that left a lasting legacy of bitterness in Irish politics. The Free State began executing Republican prisoners on 17 November 1922, when five IRA men were shot by firing squad. They were followed on 24 November by the execution of acclaimed author and treaty negotiator Erskine Childers. In all, out of around 12,000 Republican prisoners taken in the conflict, 81 were officially executed by the Free State.

The Anti-Treaty IRA in reprisal assassinated TD Seán Hales on 7 December 1922. The next day four prominent Republicans held since the first week of the war — Rory O'Connor, Liam Mellows, Richard Barrett and Joe McKelvey — were executed in revenge for the killing of Hales. In addition, Free State troops, particularly in County Kerry, where the guerrilla campaign was most bitter, began the summary execution of captured anti-treaty fighters. The most notorious example of this occurred at Ballyseedy, where nine Republican prisoners were tied to a landmine, which was detonated, killing eight and only leaving one, Stephen Fuller, who was blown clear by the blast, to escape.

The number of "unauthorised" executions of Republican prisoners during the war has been put as high as 153. Among the Republican reprisals were the assassination of Kevin O'Higgins's father and W. T. Cosgrave's uncle in February 1923.

The IRA were unable to maintain an effective guerrilla campaign, given the gradual loss of support. The Catholic Church also supported the Free State, deeming it the lawful government of the country, denouncing the IRA and refusing to administer the Sacraments to anti-treaty fighters. On 10 October 1922, the Catholic Bishops of Ireland issued a formal statement, describing the anti-treaty campaign as:

[A] system of murder and assassination of the National forces without any legitimate authority... the guerrilla warfare now being carried on [by] the Irregulars is without moral sanction and therefore the killing of National soldiers is murder before God, the seizing of public and private property is robbery, the breaking of roads, bridges and railways is criminal. All who in contravention of this teaching, participate in such crimes are guilty of grievous sins and may not be absolved in Confession nor admitted to the Holy Communion if they persist in such evil courses.

The Church's support for the Free State aroused bitter hostility among some republicans. Although the Catholic Church in independent Ireland has often been seen as a triumphalist Church, a recent study has found that it felt deeply insecure after these events.

=== End of the war ===
By early 1923, the offensive capability of the IRA had been seriously eroded and when, in February 1923, the Republican leader Liam Deasy was captured by Free State forces, he called on the republicans to end their campaign and reach an accommodation with the Free State. The State's executions of anti-treaty prisoners, 34 of whom were shot in January 1923, also took its toll on the Republicans' morale.

In addition, the National Army's operations in the field were slowly but steadily breaking up the remaining Republican concentrations.

March and April 1923 saw this progressive dismemberment of the Republican forces continue with the capture and sometimes killing of guerrilla columns. A National Army report of 11 April stated, "Events of the last few days point to the beginning of the end as a far as the irregular campaign is concerned".

As the conflict petered out into a de facto victory for the pro-treaty side, the Anti-Treaty IRA executive (senior commanders) met on 24 March 1923 in County Waterford to discuss the war's future. Tom Barry proposed a motion to end the war, but it was defeated by 6 votes to 5. Éamon de Valera was allowed to attend, after some debate, but was given no voting rights.

Lynch, the Republican leader, was killed in a skirmish in the Knockmealdown Mountains in County Tipperary on 10 April. On 11 April six more Volunteers were executed in Tuam, County Galway. The National Army had extracted information from Republican prisoners in Dublin that the IRA Executive was in the area and as well as killing Lynch, they also captured senior anti-treaty IRA officers Dan Breen, Todd Andrews, Seán Gaynor and Frank Barrett in the operation.

It is often suggested by historians including Professor Michael Laffan of University College Dublin, that the death of Lynch allowed the more pragmatic Frank Aiken, who took over as IRA Chief of Staff, to call a halt to what seemed a futile struggle. Aiken's accession to IRA leadership was followed on 30 April by the declaration of a suspension of military activities; on 24 May 1923, he issued a ceasefire order to IRA volunteers. They were to dump arms rather than surrender them or continue a fight that they were incapable of winning.

== Aftermath of the ceasefire ==
Éamon de Valera supported the order, issuing a statement to Anti-Treaty fighters on 24 May:

Soldiers of the Republic. Legion of the Rearguard: The Republic can no longer be defended successfully by your arms. Further sacrifice of life would now be in vain and the continuance of the struggle in arms unwise in the national interest and prejudicial to the future of our cause. Military victory must be allowed to rest for the moment with those who have destroyed the Republic.

The Free State government had started peace negotiations in early May, which broke down. The High Court of Justice in Ireland ruled on 31 July 1923 that a state of war no longer existed, and consequently the internment of Republicans, permitted under common law only in wartime, was now illegal. Without a formal peace, holding 13,000 prisoners and worried that fighting could break out again at any time, the government enacted two Public Safety (Emergency Powers) Acts on 1 and 3 August 1923, to permit continued internment and other measures. Thousands of Anti-Treaty IRA members (including de Valera on 15 August) were arrested by the Free State forces in the weeks and months after the end of the war, when they had dumped their arms and returned home.

A general election was held on 27 August 1923, which Cumann na nGaedheal, the pro-Free State party, won with about 40% of the first-preference vote. The Republicans, represented by Sinn Féin, won about 27% of the vote. Many of their candidates and supporters were still imprisoned before, during and after the election.

In October 1923, around 8,000 of the 12,000 Republican prisoners in Free State gaols went on a hunger strike which lasted for 41 days. Among those who died were Denny Barry, Joseph Whitty and Andy O'Sullivan. However, most of the women prisoners were released shortly thereafter and the hunger strike helped concentrate the Republican movement on the prisoners and their associated organisations. In July, de Valera had recognised the Republican political interests lay with the prisoners and went so far as to say:

The whole future of our cause and of the nation depends in my opinion upon the spirit of the prisoners in the camps and in the jails. You are the repositories of the NATIONAL FAITH AND WILL.

== Attacks on former Unionists ==
Although the cause of the Civil War was the Treaty, as the war developed the anti-treaty forces sought to identify their actions with the traditional Republican cause of the "men of no property" and the result was that large Anglo-Irish landowners and some less well-off Southern Unionists were attacked. A total of 192 "stately homes" of the old landed class and of Free State politicians were destroyed by anti-treaty forces during the war.

The stated reason for such attacks was that some landowners had become Free State senators. In October 1922, a deputation of Southern Unionists met W. T. Cosgrave to offer their support to the Free State and some of them had received positions in the State's Upper house or Senate. Among the prominent senators whose homes were attacked were: Palmerstown House near Naas, which belonged to the Earl of Mayo, Moore Hall in Mayo, Horace Plunkett (who had helped to establish the rural co-operative schemes), and Senator Henry Guinness (which was unsuccessful). Also burned was Marlfield House in Clonmel, the home of Senator John Philip Bagwell, with its extensive library of historical documents. Bagwell was kidnapped and held in the Dublin Mountains, but later released when reprisals were threatened.

However, in addition to their allegiance to the Free State, there were also other factors behind Republican animosity towards the old landed class. Many, but not all of these people, had supported the Crown forces during the War of Independence. This support was often largely moral, but sometimes it took the form of actively assisting the British in the conflict. Such attacks should have ended with the Truce of 11 July 1921, but they continued after the truce and escalated during the Civil War. In July 1922, Con Moloney, the IRA Adjutant General, ordered that unionist property should be seized to accommodate their men. The "worst spell" of attacks on former unionist property came in the early months of 1923, 37 "big houses" being burnt in January and February alone.

Though the Land Purchase (Ireland) Act 1903 allowed tenants to buy land from their landlords, some small farmers, particularly in Mayo and Galway, simply occupied land belonging to political opponents during this period when the RIC had ceased to function. In 1919, senior Sinn Féin officials were sufficiently concerned at this unilateral action that they instituted Arbitration Courts to adjudicate disputes. Sometimes these attacks had sectarian overtones, although most IRA men made no distinction between Catholic and Protestant supporters of the Irish government.

The IRA burnt an orphanage housing Protestant boys near Clifden, County Galway in June 1922, on the ground that it was "pro-British". The 60 orphans were taken to Devonport on board a Royal Navy destroyer.

Controversy continues to this day about the extent of intimidation of Protestants at this time. Many left Ireland during and after the Civil War. Dr Andy Bielenberg of UCC considers that about 41,000 who were not linked to the former British administration left Southern Ireland (which became the Irish Free State) between 1919 and 1923. He has found that a "high-water mark" of this 41,000 left between 1921 and 1923. In all, from 1911 to 1926, the Protestant population of the 26 counties fell from some 10.4% of the total population to 7.4%.

== Foreign support ==
The Civil War attracted international attention which led to various groups expressing support and opposition to the anti-treaty side. The Communist Party of Great Britain in its journal The Communist wrote "The proletarians of the IRA have the future of Ireland in their hands. If the Irish Labour Party would only dare! A mass movement of the Irish workers in alliance with the IRA could establish a Workers' Republic now". They were also supported by the Communist International (Comintern) which on 3 January 1923 passed a resolution stating it "sends fraternal greetings to the struggling Irish national revolutionaries and feels assured that they will soon tread the only path that leads to real freedom – the path of Communism. The CI will assist all efforts to organise the struggle to combat this terror and to help the Irish workers and peasants to victory."

The majority of Irish-Americans supported the treaty, including those in Clann na Gael and Friends of Irish Freedom. However anti-treaty republicans had control of what was left of Clann na Gael and the American Association for the Recognition of the Irish Republic so they supported the anti-treaty side during the war.

== Consequences ==
=== Casualties ===
The Civil War, though short, was bloody. It cost the lives of many public figures, including Michael Collins, Cathal Brugha, Arthur Griffith and Liam Lynch. Both sides carried out brutal acts—the anti-treaty forces killed a TD and several other pro-Treaty politicians and burned many homes of senators and Free State supporters; while the government executed anti-treaty prisoners, officially and unofficially.

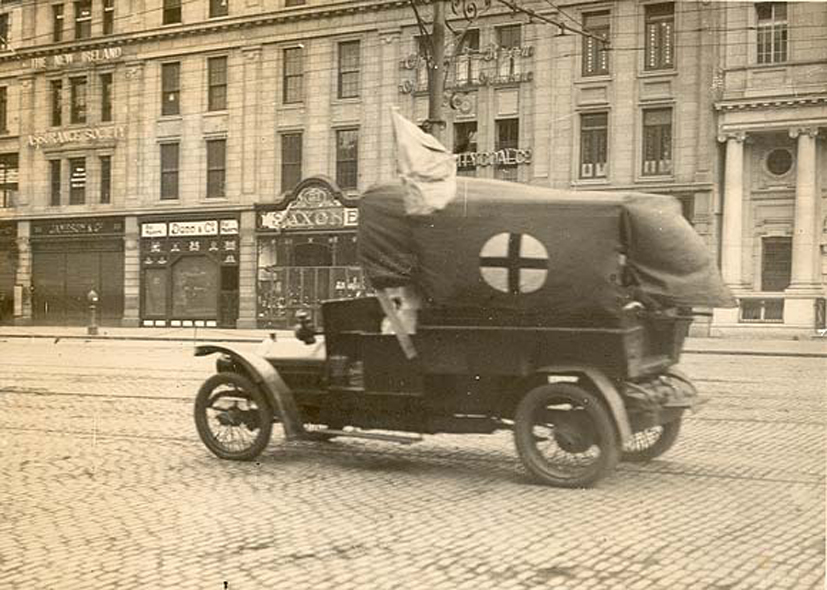
Red Cross ambulance passing the G.P.O. on Sackville Street

The 2023 Irish Civil War Fatalities Project, a University College Cork research project funded by the Department of Tourism, Culture, Arts, Gaeltacht, Sport and Media, has calculated that the pro-treaty forces suffered 637 fatalities from all causes. Both the project and the Republican roll of honour, compiled in the 1920s, calculate that 426 anti-Treaty IRA Volunteers were killed between January 1922 and April 1924. It has, however, been suggested that the anti-treaty forces' true death toll was higher. For total combatant and civilian deaths, figures of 1,426 in the Free State and 1,485 for the island of Ireland have been calculated by the 2023 project. A 2012 county-by-county study suggested a death toll of just under 2,000. In the decades following the Civil War, casualty figures as high as 4,000 were suggested, though these numbers are generally accepted to be too high.

The Garda Síochána (new police force) was not involved in the war, which meant that it was well placed to develop into an unarmed and politically neutral police service after the war. It had been disarmed by the Government in order to win public confidence in June–September 1922 and in December 1922, the IRA issued a General Order not to fire on the Civil Guard. The Criminal Investigation Department, or CID, a 350-strong, armed, plain-clothed Police Corps that had been established during the conflict for the purposes of counter-insurgency, was disbanded in October 1923, shortly after the conflict's end.

=== Economic costs ===
The economic costs of the war were also high. As their forces abandoned their fixed positions in July–August 1922, the Republicans burned many of the administrative buildings and businesses that they had been occupying. In addition, their subsequent guerrilla campaign caused much destruction, and the economy of the Free State suffered a hard blow in the earliest days of its existence, as a result. The material damage caused by the war to property in the Free State has been estimated to be in the region of £50 million in 1922. This is equivalent to about £2.2 billion, or €2.6 billion worth of damage in 2024 values.

Particularly damaging to the Free State's economy was the systematic destruction of railway infrastructure and roads by the Republicans. In addition, the cost to the Free State of waging the war came to another £17 million (£718m or €883m in 2022 values). By September 1923, Deputy Hogan estimated the cost at £50 million. The new State ended 1923 with a budget deficit of over £4 million (£168m or €196m in 2022 values). This weakened financial situation meant that the new state could not pay its share of Imperial debt under the treaty. This adversely affected the boundary negotiations in 1924–25, in which the Free State government acquiesced that border with Northern Ireland would remain unchanged in exchange for forgiveness of the Imperial debt. Further, the state undertook to pay for damage caused to property between the truce of July 1921 and the end of the Civil War; W. T. Cosgrave told the Dáil:

Every Deputy in this House is aware of the complaint which has been made that the measure of compensation for post-Truce damage compares unfavourably with the awards for damage suffered pre-Truce.

=== Political results ===
The fact that the Irish Civil War was fought between Irish Nationalist factions meant that the sporadic conflict in Northern Ireland ended. Collins and Sir James Craig signed an agreement to end it on 30 March 1922, but, despite this, Collins covertly supplied arms to the Northern IRA until a week before his death in August 1922. Because of the Irish Civil War, Northern Ireland was able to consolidate its existence and the partition of Ireland was confirmed for the foreseeable future. The continuing war also confirmed the northern Unionists' existing stance against the ethos of all shades of nationalism. This might have led to open hostilities between North and South had the Irish Civil War not broken out. Indeed, the Ulster Special Constabulary (the "B-Specials") that had been established in 1920 (on the foundation of Northern Ireland) was expanded in 1922 rather than being demobilised.

In the event, it was only well after their defeat in the Civil War that anti-treaty Irish Republicans seriously considered whether to take armed action against British rule in Northern Ireland (the first serious suggestion to do this came in the late 1930s). The northern units of the IRA largely supported the Free State side in the Civil War because of Collins's policies, and over 500 of them joined the new Free State's National Army.

The cost of the war and the budget deficit it caused was a difficulty for the new Free State and affected the Boundary Commission negotiations of 1925, which were to determine the border with Northern Ireland. The Free State agreed to waive its claim to predominantly Nationalist areas in Northern Ireland and in return its agreed share of the Imperial debt under the 1921 Treaty was not paid.

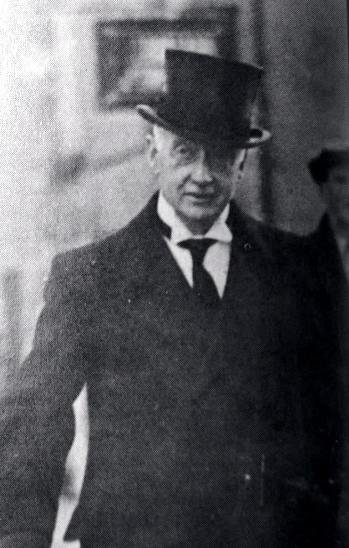
W. T. Cosgrave

In 1926, having failed to persuade the majority of the Anti-Treaty IRA or the anti-treaty party of Sinn Féin to accept the new status quo as a basis for an evolving Republic, a large faction led by de Valera and Aiken left to resume constitutional politics and to found the Fianna Fáil party. Whereas Fianna Fáil was to become the dominant party in Irish politics, Sinn Féin became a small, isolated political party. The IRA, then much more numerous and influential than Sinn Féin, remained associated with Fianna Fáil (though not directly) until banned by de Valera in 1935.

In 1927, Fianna Fáil members took the Oath of Allegiance and entered the Dáil, effectively recognising the legitimacy of the Free State. The Free State was already moving towards independence by this point. Under the Statute of Westminster 1931, the British Parliament gave up its right to legislate for members of the British Commonwealth. When elected to power in 1932, Fianna Fáil under de Valera set about dismantling what they considered to be objectionable features of the treaty, abolishing the Oath of Allegiance, removing the power of the Office of Governor General (British representative in Ireland) and abolishing the Senate, which was dominated by former Unionists and pro-treaty Nationalists. In 1937, they passed a new constitution, which made a President the head of state, did not mention any allegiance to the British monarch, and which included a territorial claim to Northern Ireland. The following year, Britain returned without conditions the seaports that it had kept under the terms of the treaty. When the Second World War broke out in 1939, the state was able to demonstrate its independence by remaining neutral throughout the war, although Dublin did to some extent tacitly support the Allies. Finally, in 1948, a coalition government, containing elements of both sides in the Civil War (pro-treaty Fine Gael and anti-treaty Clann na Poblachta) left the British Commonwealth and described the state as a republic in The Republic of Ireland Act 1948. By the 1950s, the issues over which the Civil War had been fought were largely settled.

== Legacy and memory ==
As with many civil wars, the internecine conflict left a bitter legacy, which continues to influence Irish politics to this day. The two largest political parties in the republic through most of its history (except for the 2011 and 2020 general elections) were Fianna Fáil and Fine Gael, the descendants respectively of the anti-treaty and pro-treaty forces of 1922. Until the 1970s, almost all of Ireland's prominent politicians were veterans of the Civil War, a fact which poisoned the relationship between Ireland's two biggest parties. Civil War veterans include Republicans Éamon de Valera, Frank Aiken, Todd Andrews and Seán Lemass; and Free State supporters W. T. Cosgrave, Richard Mulcahy and Kevin O'Higgins.

Moreover, many of these men's sons and daughters also became politicians, meaning that the personal wounds of the civil war were felt over three generations. In the 1930s, after Fianna Fáil took power for the first time, it looked possible for a while that the Civil War might break out again between the IRA and the pro-Free State Blueshirts. This crisis was averted, and by the 1950s violence was no longer prominent in politics in the Republic of Ireland. However, the breakaway IRA continued (and continues in various forms) to exist. It was not until 1948 that the IRA renounced military attacks on the forces of the southern Irish state when it became the Republic of Ireland. After this point, the organisation dedicated itself primarily to the end of British rule in Northern Ireland. Nonetheless, the IRA Army Council continued to make claim to be the legitimate Provisional Government of the Irish Republic declared in 1916 and annulled by the Anglo-Irish Treaty of 1921.

=== Fictional accounts ===
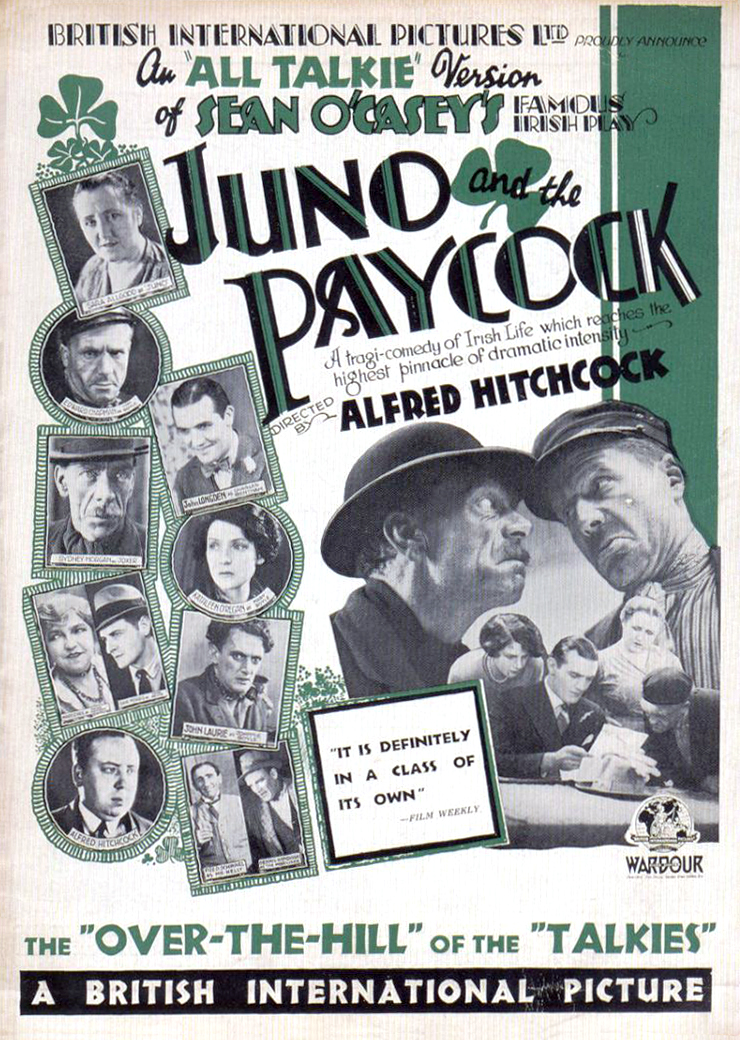
Alfred Hitchock's 1930 film version of O'Casey's play

According to Edward Quinn, the play "Juno and the Paycock" by Seán O'Casey is a tragicomedy that criticises the civil war and the foolishness that led to it. Irish writer James Stephens says the play's theme is an "orchestrated hymn against all poverty and hate."

== Bibliography ==
- "Debate on the Treaty between Great Britain and Ireland, signed in London on the 6th December 1921: Sessions 14 December 1921 to 10 January 1922". celt.ucc.ie. Archived from the original on 3 August 2020.
- A record of some mansions and houses destroyed 1922–23. The Irish Claims Compensation Association. 1924.
- Walsh, Paul V (1998). "The Irish Civil War 1922–23 – A Study of the Conventional Phase". NYMAS. Archived from the original on 18 December 2014.
- Collins, Mary Elizabeth (1993). Ireland 1868–1966. Educational Company of Ireland. ISBN 978-0-86167-305-6.
- Coogan, Tim Pat (1993). De Valera: long fellow, long shadow. Hutchinson. ISBN 978-0-09-175030-5.
- Dolan, Anne (2006). Commemorating the Irish Civil War: History and Memory, 1923–2000. Cambridge University Press. ISBN 978-0-521-02698-7.
- Harrington, Niall C. (1992). Kerry Landing, August, 1922: An Episode of the Civil War. Anvil Books. ISBN 978-0-947962-70-8.
- Hopkinson, Michael (1988). Green Against Green: The Irish Civil War. Gill and Macmillan. ISBN 978-0-7171-1202-9.
- Neeson, Eoin (1989). The Civil War, 1922–23. Poolbeg. ISBN 978-1-85371-013-1.
- O'Connor, Frank (1969) [1937]. The Big Fellow: Michael Collins and the Irish Revolution. Corgi Books.
- Taylor, Rex (1958). Michael Collins. Four Square Books.
- O'Malley, Ernie (1978). The Singing Flame. Anvil Books. ISBN 978-0-900068-40-9.
- Ryan, Meda (1986). Liam Lynch: the real chief. Mercier Press. ISBN 978-0-85342-764-3.
- Younger, Calton (1968). Ireland's Civil War. Muller. ISBN 9787460002652. OCLC 251869158.
