= Denny Barry =

Irish patriot

Denis "Dinny" Barry
- Born: 15 July 1883; Riverstick, County Cork, Ireland
- Died: 20 November 1923 (aged 40); Curragh Camp, Ireland
- Occupation: Irish Republican
- Known for: Participation in the 1923 Irish Hunger Strikes

Denis Barry (15 July 1883 – 20 November 1923) was an Irish Republican who died during the 1923 Irish hunger strikes, shortly after the Irish Civil War.

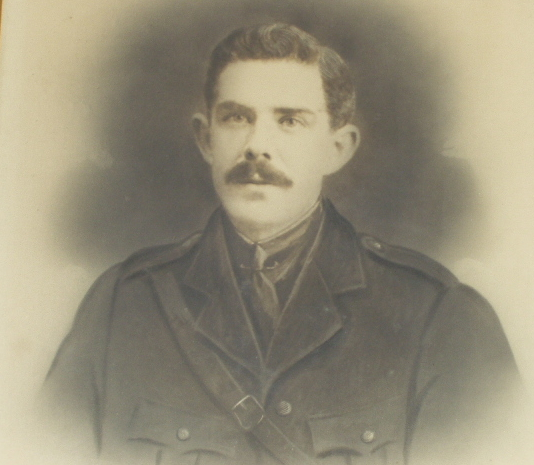
Barry in 1920

== Early life ==
Barry was born into a farming family in Riverstick, in south County Cork, and learnt Irish from a young age. In 1903, he moved to Cork to work in a drapery, where he became involved in the Gaelic League and the Ancient Order of Hibernians. A successful athlete, he also played hurling for Cork.

== Volunteer activity ==
In 1913, he joined the newly formed Irish Volunteers. In 1915, he moved to Kilkenny to take up employment there, where he continued his volunteer activities. Shortly after the Easter Rising, he was arrested in Kilkenny in a British Government crackdown, and sent to Frongoch internment camp in North Wales. In 1919, he returned to Cork, where he was Commandant of the Irish Republican Police in Cork during the Irish War of Independence. In the Cork Number One brigade of the Irish Republican Army (IRA), he helped with prisoner escapes and returning looted goods after the burning of Cork by Black and Tans. After the Anglo-Irish Treaty and the split that followed, Barry chose the anti-Treaty branch of the IRA; he was captured by Irish Free State troops and was sent to Newbridge internment camp on 6 October 1922 (Barry was not charged or convicted of any crime).

== Hunger strike and death ==
Irish Republican prisoners in Mountjoy Prison began the 1923 Irish Hunger Strikes, protesting being interned without charges or trial and poor prison conditions. The strike quickly spread to other camps and prisons, and Barry took part starting on 16 October. He died 35 days later on 20 November 1923, at the hospital at Curragh Camp. IRA Volunteers Joseph Whitty from Wexford died on 2 September 1923 and Andy O'Sullivan (Irish Republican) died as a result of hunger on 22 November 1923 in Mountjoy Prison, the 41 day hunger strike was called off the next day - 23 November. Whitty, Barry and O'Sullivan were three of the 22 Irish Republicans who died on hunger-strike during the twentieth century. Barry was initially buried by the Free State army in the Curragh, but three days later, following a court order, his remains were disinterred. Denis Barry is buried in the Republican plot at St. Finbarr's Cemetery, Cork.

== Memorial ==
Prior to his body arriving in County Cork, the Bishop of Cork, Daniel Cohalan (bishop of Cork) issued a letter to the Catholic Churches which forbade them to open their doors to the body of Barry. Bishop Cohalan expressed far different opinions on the 1920 death (also by hunger strike) of the Lord Mayor of Cork Terence MacSwiney: "Terence MacSwiney takes his place among the martyrs in the sacred cause of the Freedom of Ireland. We bow in respect before his heroic sacrifice. We pray that God may have mercy on his soul."

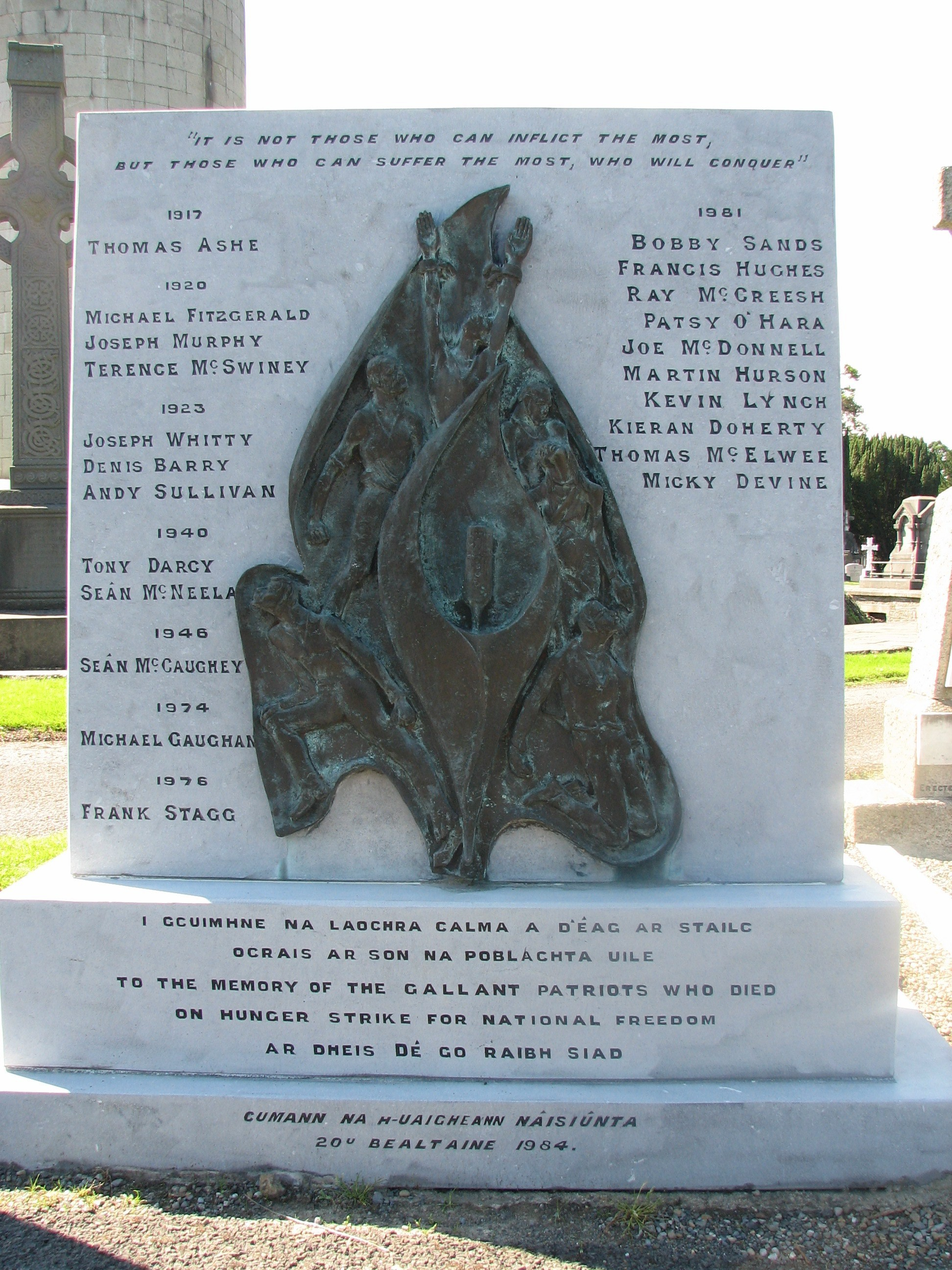
Hunger Strike Memorial in Dublin’s Glasnevin Cemetery

In Commandant Barry's hometown of Riverstick there stands a stone memorial (unveiled in 1966) in his honor and he is remembered with a wreath-laying commemoration every November.
