= Cork County Gaol =

Former prison in Cork, Ireland

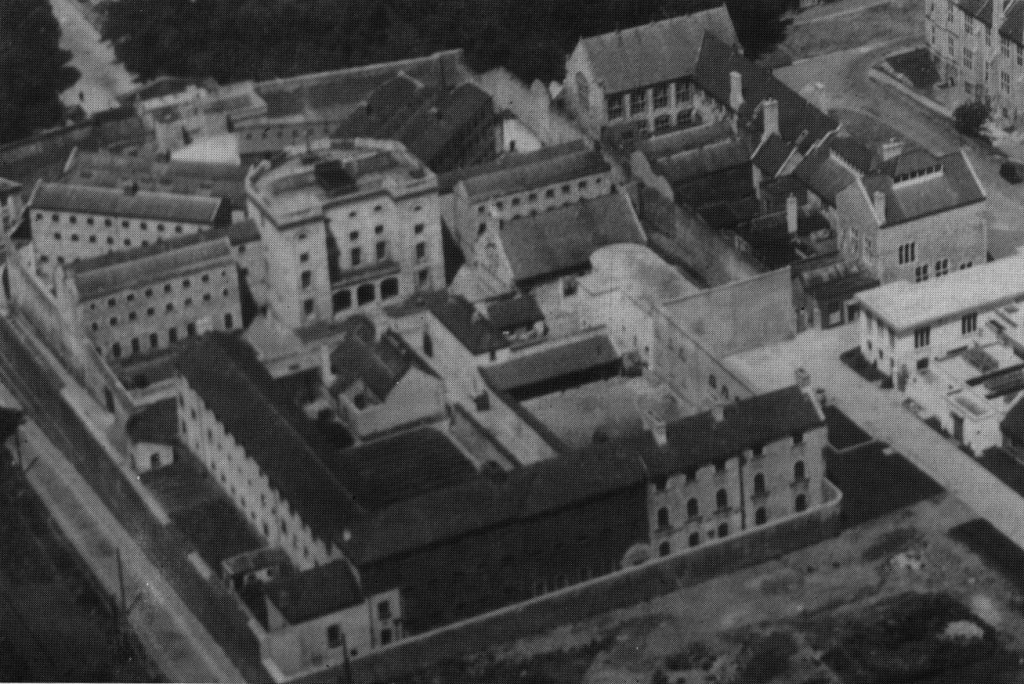
Aerial photograph of Cork County Gaol

Cork County Gaol was a former prison located in Cork, Ireland. The main walls and gate entrance of the prison are today incorporated in the perimeter of University College Cork.

== History ==
The main Cork County Gaol buildings were erected in the years 1818–1823; earlier buildings had been on the site in the 1790s.

The 19th century building was designed and built by the brothers James and George Pain.

== Description ==
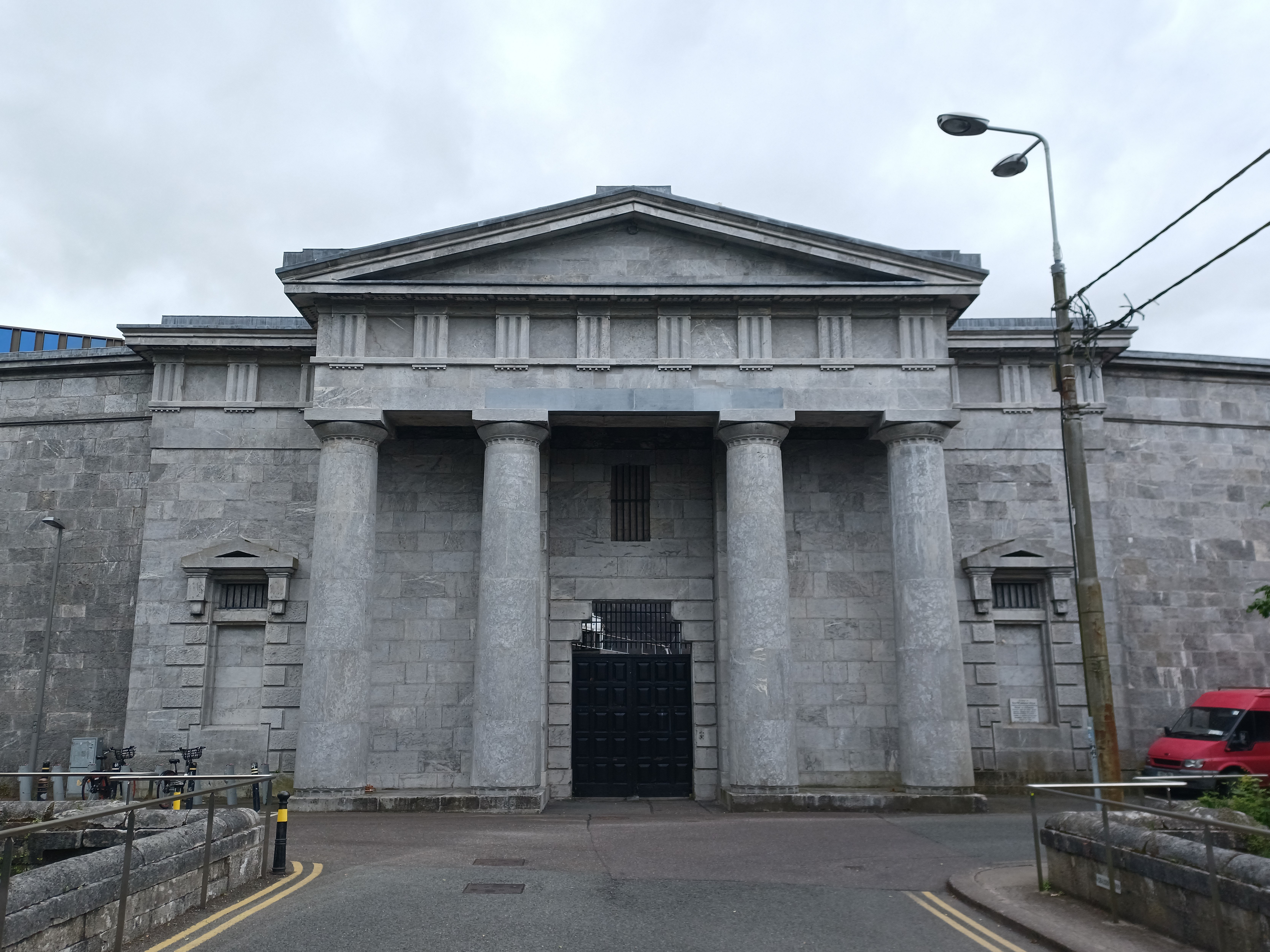
Doric entrance portico

The gaol was designed in the Greek Revival style, with a monumental Doric entrance portico. Inside was a central building with radiating cell-block wings, a governor's house, a chapel and a series of other buildings and yards, including homes for the families of some prison officials.

== County Gaol ==
When the prison opened in the 1820s it housed both male and female prisoners, whose crimes were committed within the county boundary but outside the Cork city boundary (anyone committing a crime in the city was committed to the City Gaol, across the river at Sunday's Well.

=== 19th century ===
During the first half of the 19th century the County Gaol also served as a temporary prison for convicts who had been sentenced to be transported to Australia.

The County Gaol was the scene of executions by hanging, which took place in public outside the Gaol until the 1860s.

Queen's College Cork (now University College Cork) was built next to the gaol in the 1840s. Bodies of hanged prisoners were used as cadavers in the college's medical school.

== Men's gaol (city and county) ==
The General Prisons (Ireland) Act 1877 (40 & 41 Vict. c. 49) reorganised the prisons in Cork. The Cork County Gaol became a men's gaol (for Cork City and Cork County) and the Cork City Gaol became a women's gaol (for Cork City and Cork County). On the day the change came into effect, female prisoners were marched out of the western road and over to the Sunday's Well prison, while the men were marched in the opposite direction.

=== 19th century ===
During the Parnell Commission in 1888/1889 one of the facts entered into evidence against Tim Healy was that he had "visited certain persons" in Cork prison.

=== 20th century ===
On 11 November 1918 Irish Volunteer officer Donnchadh Mac Niallghuis (other name spellings include Donnchadh Mac Niallais, Denis McNeilus and Donnacha McNeilus) escaped from Cork County Gaol, when a number of Irish Volunteers held up British soldiers at gunpoint outside the Gaol, whilst 6 other Volunteers entered the Gaol, overpowered the guards and rescued McNeilus.

==== Irish War of Independence ====
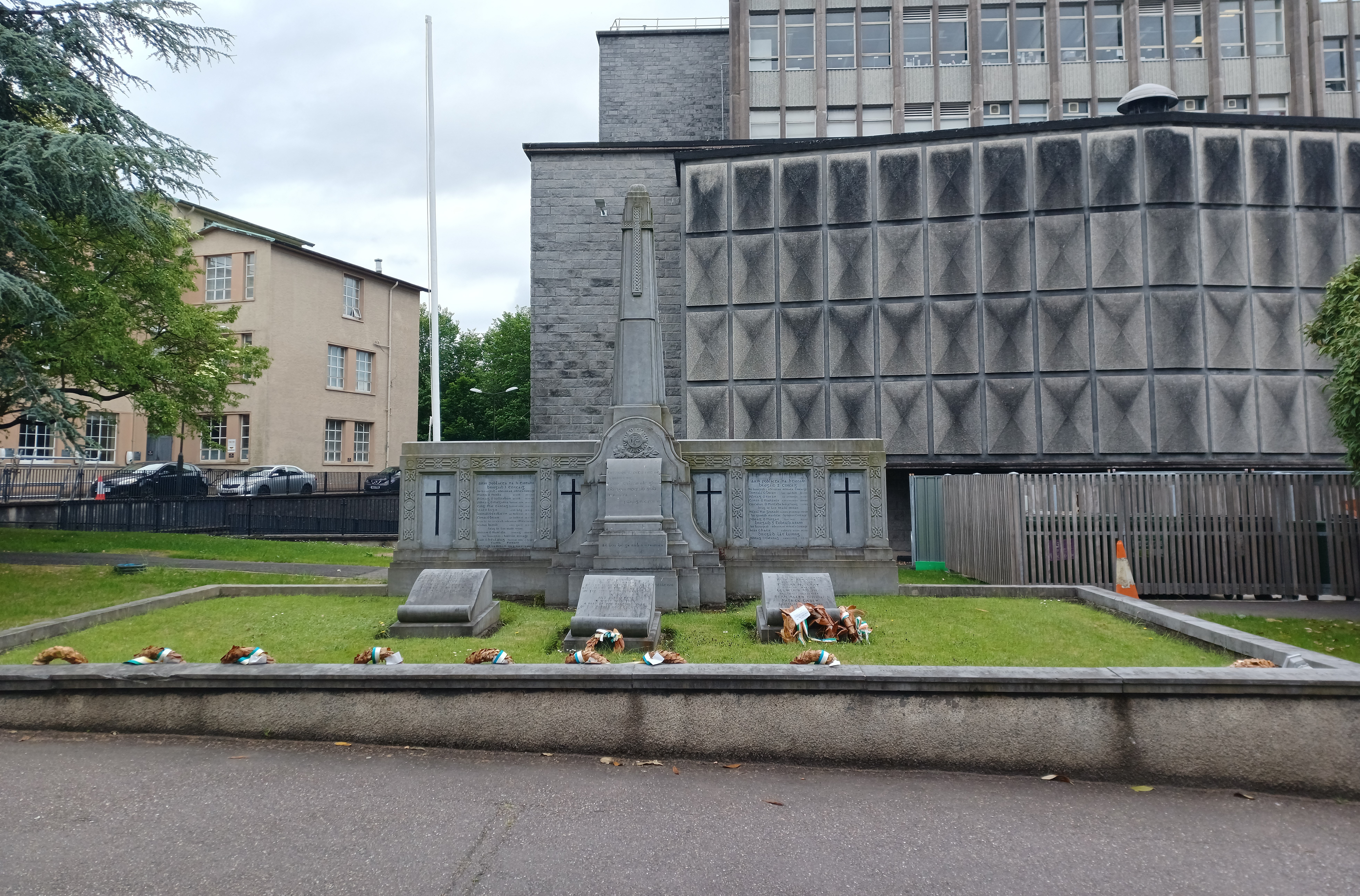
1948 memorial at the burial plot of 13 republicans executed in Cork city in 1920–1921

During the Irish War of Independence (1919–22), the gaol was used to hold republican prisoners.

On 17 October and 25 October 1920, volunteers Mick Fitzgerald and Joe Murphy died on hunger strike at Cork Gaol.

On Tuesday 1 February 1921, volunteer Cornelius Murphy was executed by firing squad at the Gaol.

On Monday 28 February 1921, six prisoners were executed by firing squad: "On 28 January 1921 the 6th Battalion, Cork No.1 Brigade were preparing an ambush in Dripsey, Co. Cork when they were surrounded by soldiers of the 1st Battalion, The Manchester Regiment, most were taken prisoner [the Battalion Adjutant James Barrett was fatally wounded and died three weeks later]. After a military trial on the morning of 28th February 1921 six of the IRA prisoners were executed by firing squad in Cork. The six Volunteers executed were Patrick Mahoney, Timothy McCarthy, John Lyons, Daniel Callaghan, Thomas O’Brien and John Allen. That evening between 18.30 and 20.00 the IRA retaliated and shot 12 British soldiers on the streets of Cork. The first to be shot was Private Wyse who was shot by two men, shortly afterwards Corporal Hodnett was shot four times in a nearby street."

The shootings of the 6th Battalion Volunteers were the last War of Independence executions carried out at the Gaol and in the months that followed Republican prisoners would be executed at Victoria Barracks.

==== Civil War ====
Republican (anti-treaty) prisoners were held in the gaol during and after the Irish Civil War (1922–23).

On 25 September 1922, a Republican prisoner, volunteer Patrick Mangan (a veteran of the War of Independence from Lismore), was shot by a sentry as he tried to escape from Cork County Gaol.

At 08:00 on 13 March 1923, the Free State Government executed a Republican prisoner named William Healy (born in Lackabawn, Donoughmore in 1900) at Cork County Gaol. On the evening before he faced the firing squad he wrote to his father telling him, "If I had told on one of the boys, I would not be executed but, as you know, I would not have it said that there was a spy in our family, because as you know I was out for a Republic and I sincerely hope it will be got some day,"

Some of those executed in Cork County Gaol are buried in the former exercise yard and their graves are marked by a carved stone memorial erected by their former comrades (it was unveiled in 1948). Other patriots of that time, buried elsewhere, are also remembered on this memorial and on the gaol façade (nearby on Gaol Walk).

==== Later use ====
On 3 August 1940 John Joe Kavanagh attempted to dig a tunnel into the prison so his IRA comrades inside could escape. He was spotted by a sentry and shot dead. There is a plaque erected to his memory at the old gaol gates.

== Decline ==
By the late 1940s the gaol was in poor condition and being used to detain only boys.

The southern part of the prison site was transferred to the ownership of University College Cork in 1947 (this was the area on which the university built the Electrical Engineering Building in 1954).

== Closure and demolition ==
The gaol was finally closed and the remainder of the site transferred to UCC in 1957.

UCC demolished the remaining buildings except for the Greek Revival facade and parts of the boundary wall (the chapel was kept for a while for use by the Department of Biochemistry).

The 'New Science Building' (now the Sir Robert Kane Building) was built in 1971.

== Former prisoners ==
- David Kent, 1889
- William Kent, 1889 & 1890
- Thomas Kent, 1890
- Denis McNeilus, 1918
- Michael Fitzgerald, 1920
- Joe Murphy, 1920
- Maurice Moore, 1921
