= Kent family of Bawnard =

The Kents were a family of prominent Irish nationalists and republicans from Castlelyons, County Cork who were active from the 1870s until the 1930s.

They first came to national prominence when brothers David Jr, Edmond, Richard, and William led a boycott in 1889 against Robert Browne, the general manager of a Belfast-based landowner, who had evicted their cousins Austin and Richard Rice from the latter's leased farm. The four brothers served time and, at the end of May 1890, Tom (who had returned from the United States), William, and cousin Austin Rice were charged with intimidating a woman who worked for Browne and sentenced to one month's imprisonment, with hard labour. The men were still in prison when Tom and William were among seven men charged with attempting to ‘compel and induce’ 14 members of McCausland's workforce to leave their employment. The case drew attention beyond Ireland and was raised in the House of Commons. Heavy sentences followed - six months' hard labour for William and two for Thomas. In January 1899, Tom barracked for a representative on the Cork County Council who would commit to certain policies including home rule, release of political prisoners, reinstatement of evicted tenants and compulsory sale of land to tenant farmers. Tom became an avid supporter of the Gaelic League and later Sinn Féin. By 1901, the family farm was under almost constant surveillance by the Royal Irish Constabulary. In 1913, brothers, Thomas and David, were active in the Irish Volunteers and started a Castlelyons Branch of the organisation. In January, 1916, Thomas was charge with making seditious speeches. While acquitted, within two weeks, he was arrested again and sentenced to two months imprisonment for possession of firearms.

In 1916, during the round-up in the aftermath of the Easter Rising the Royal Irish Constabulary surrounded the family home. Mary Kent and four of her sons, Thomas, David, William, and Richard resisted arrest. The fight lasted four hours. When it was over, David and Richard were wounded. The following week, Thomas was convicted of the murder of a constable killed during the shoot-out and executed by firing squad on 9 May. Richard died of his injuries on 4 May 1916. David Kent sentenced to death but the sentence was later commuted to penal servitude for life but he was released from prison by amnesty in 1917, by which time, his mother, Mary had also died.

David Kent was elected to Parliament at the 1918 general election as a Sinn Féin MP for the Cork East constituency. After the Irish War of Independence, he opposed the Anglo-Irish Treaty and voted against it. He served as a member of parliament (TD) until 1927when he was succeeded by his brother. In the late 1920s, David Kent went to the United States to raise money for the Republican cause. He died at Bawnard in 1930." In 1927, William was elected as a Fianna Fáil member of parliament (TD) for the Cork East at the September general election but was not reelected in 1932. At the 1933 general election, William was elected as a National Centre Party TD but he did not run for re-election in 1937. William Kent died in 1957, the "last survivor of the band of local Land League fighters".

== Land War ==
The Kents were an Irish family, with roots dating back to the 12th century, that settled in Cork in the mid 16th century.

In 1881, a 15 year old Thomas Kent and older brother Edmond attended a Land League meeting in Castlelyons. Edmond was a Land League organiser. Their "cousins, the Curtain Kent family, had some years previously been evicted from their farm."

=== Eviction of the Rice family ===
In 1887, during the Land War, brothers Austin and Richard Rice were evicted from their farm for non-payment of rent beginning a series of events which would bring the Kent family to national prominence.

The Rices had initially leased the farm from the Peard family but, in July 1888, it was sold to Orr McCausland, a Belfast-based landowner and their homestead was occupied by a steward and a general manager, Robert Browne, reportedly Scottish. The brothers, together with their cousins, the Kents, teamed up with the parish curate, Father Jeremiah O’Dwyer, to launch a boycott against Browne. They organised a meeting at Coolagown and O'Dwyer pleaded with a crowd of 300 not to overact against Browne.

In the autumn of 1889, four of the Kent brothers, Edmond, David, William and Richard– were among ten men hauled into a crowded Fermoy Courthouse and charged with orchestrating a boycott campaign. The brothers were the sons, of David Kent, who had died in 1876, and his wife, Mary (née Rice). The Irish-speaking family (seven sons & two daughters), lived at Bawnard House, Coole, Castlelyons, County Cork, and according to son, William, had farmed 200 acres at Bawnard for generations.

In court, Browne told how Edmond Kent, the eldest brother, threatened him, while David Kent had blown horns at him and called him a ‘land-grabber’. The second oldest Kent brother, Thomas, did not appear in the dock because he had emigrated to Boston in May 1884 but he had been accused of throwing eggs at Browne's car.

The court took a dim view on the defendants and imposed harsh sentences. Fr. O’Dwyer was sentenced to six months in prison, Edmond and William were given four months with hard labour, and David was given two months with hard labour. However, Richard, the youngest son, was not given a prison sentence.

From the dock, Edmond shouted, ‘Death or victory is our war-cry, and then the Saxon chains will break’, while another prisoner called Callaghan McCarthy managed to play a few bars of ‘God Save Ireland’ on a flute. The prisoners were handcuffed, taken out to a wagonette and driven to the railway station, from which a special carriage transported them to Cork Gaol. Anticipating the crowd of several thousand who gathered to cheer the prisoners, the authorities provided the prisoners with an escort of 200 soldiers of the Royal Warwickshire and West Cork Regiments, with bayonets fixed.

=== The Browne boycott continues ===
The boycott on Browne resumed after the Kents had served their time. At the end of May 1890, Tom (who had returned from Boston in June 1887) and his brother William were charged, alongside Austin Rice, with intimidating Mary Murphy, an elderly woman who worked for Browne, by preventing her from purchasing a pig at a fair.

During their trial, Browne, now under police protection, told how horns were continually blown towards his house from the Kent residence. When the magistrate sentenced the brothers to one month's imprisonment, with hard labour, William roared ‘Victory is our cry and our motto: no surrender’, while Thomas slammed his fist upon the desk and shouted "God save Ireland".

Uproar followed and the police were ordered to clear the court. As the prisoners were escorted to the railway station, the District Inspector Ball became so unnerved by the cheering crowd that he ordered his men to charge with their batons and several people were injured. The army then blocked Fermoy Bridge and cleared the streets.

=== McCausland ===
Thomas and William Kent were still in prison when a fresh case came before Fermoy Court in June 1890. They were amongst seven men accused of attempting to ‘compel and induce’ 14 members of McCausland's workforce to leave their employment. William was described as the ringleader of a campaign to intimidate McCausland's staff when they attempted to attend Mass at Coolagown Chapel. The case was raised in the House of Commons where both Kent brothers were named.

Arthur Balfour, the Chief Secretary for Ireleand, described "the most disgraceful scenes". William Kent was accused of spitting upon the workers and their families, having ‘performed the acrobatic feat of entering the chapel by the window and assisted others to enter the same way.’ There was also much ‘jeering and jibing the police’. Thomas Kent took ‘an active part in the disgraceful proceedings, but was not at all so bad as his brother William.’

Heavy sentences followed - six months hard labour for William and two for Thomas and once again a cheering crowd followed them to the train station in Fermoy.

=== William Kent's personal account ===
William Kent later left an account of the whole boycott episode, "[i]n 1889, my brothers, Edmond, Richard and David, the local curate, Rev. Father O'Dwyer, and myself were arrested. Owing to his youth, the younger brother, Richard, was acquitted by the resident magistrates, Colonels Gardiner and Caddell. David received six months' hard labour; Edmond and I were each sentenced to four months' hard labour. The charge was conspiracy with others to evade payment of rents. The sentences were served in Cork County Jail. For refusing to enter into bail for our future good behaviour, we served an additional three months' imprisonment.

A short time after our release, my other brother, Thomas, who had been in America, returned and threw his lot into the fight. Both he and I were arrested under the Balfour Coercion Acts. Another trumped-up charge of conspiracy was brought against us. I was sentenced to six months' hard labour and Thomas was sentenced to two months. These sentences were served in Cork Jail. On our release, we were met by thousands of people in Fermoy who escorted us all the way home to Bawnard."

== Volunteers ==
In January 1899, Tom attended a meeting in Castlelyons to select a candidate to represent the Fermoy and Castlelyons district on Cork County Council. To loud applause, he told the crowd of the policies that he believed the candidate must be pledged to, namely:

- Home Rule,
- the establishment of a Catholic University,
- the release of political prisoners,
- the reinstatement of evicted tenants and
- the compulsory sale of land to tenant farmers.

When Michael Mackay of Ballyroberts was proposed as the Nationalist candidate, the motion was seconded by David Kent who seized the opportunity to point out to the gathering that the Unionist candidate, Colonel Johnson, had been Hon. Secretary to the Landlord's Association. A show of hands was called for at the end of the evening and Mackay won by a huge majority. Tom became an avid supporter of the Gaelic League and later of Arthur Griffith's Sinn Féin

By 1901, Mary Kent (age 60) was living at Bawnard House with five of her unmarried sons and one daughter. The Kent home was under constant surveillance by the Royal Irish Constabulary.

In 1913, two of the four Kent brothers, Thomas and David, became active in the Irish Volunteers and they started a Castlelyons Branch of the organisation. William Kent later wrote: "In 1914 and 1915 Thomas and David took an active part with Terence MacSwiney in the enrolment of the Irish Volunteers. They called a meeting at Clonmult and got the famous Clonmult hurlers to march to the village of Dungourney where a British recruiting meeting was being held. Thomas and David led the men through this meeting, and, halting a short distance away from it, addressed the crowd, advising them to join the Volunteers and have nothing whatever to do with the British Army." The Castleyons branch of the Irish Volunteers was said to be the first teetotal branch of the organisation in Ireland and many of their training manoeuvres took place in the woods around the Kents' home at Bawnard.

In August 1915, Thomas Kent attended the funeral of the Fenian leader Jeremiah O'Donovan Rossa in Glasnevin, Dublin, at which Patrick Pearse delivered his celebrated oration. William Kent stated, "Early in January, 1916, Thomas and Terence MacSwiney were arrested and charged before a bench of magistrates in Cork with making seditious speeches at Ballynoe. They were acquitted. Within a week or two Thomas was again arrested and sentenced to two months imprisonment because arms and ammunition were found in the house."

== Easter Rising ==
On 2 May 1916, during the round-up in the aftermath of the Easter Rising the Royal Irish Constabulary surrounded Bawnard House, and 81 year old Mary Kent and four of her sons Thomas, David, William, and Richard resisted arrest. William Kent recounted,

"The house was surrounded by British Crown Forces.... I immediately awakened Tom, who was sleeping in the Western side of the house, and said, "The whole place is surrounded. We are caught like rats in a trap." Tom put some clothes on, armed himself with a rifle, and, without showing himself, called to those below, "What do you want?". As expected, the answer came, "We are police and have orders to arrest the whole family." The reply was given definitely by the whole family, "We are soldiers of the Irish Republic, and there is no surrender". Our mother, then over eighty years of age, dressed herself, and all during the ensuing fight assisted by loading weapons and with words of encouragement. The police fired a volley to which we replied and a fierce conflict began. We were armed with three shot guns and a rifle. The fight lasted about three hours. Head Constable Rowe was shot dead, while other members of the R.I.C. were wounded. David was also badly wounded, having lost two fingers and received a gaping wound in his side. Military reinforcements arrived and when the last shot was fired from the house we had no alternative but to surrender, Our ammunition was exhausted. The house was wrecked. Not a pane of glass was left unbroken. The interior was tattooed with marks of rifle bullets.... At one time the fire of the attackers was attracted to the window of the Oratory where they thought a girl was firing at them. Strange to say, it was the statue of our Lady of Lourdes they saw from outside.... Following the surrender we were taken out through a window assisted by the military. Thomas was not permitted time to put on his boots. Thomas and I were immediately handcuffed. Richard, a famous athlete, was not immediately handcuffed and in the confusion he attempted to escape by bounding over a hedge nearby. He was fired on and fell, mortally wounded. We were then lined up against a wall of the house by the R.I.C. who prepared to shoot us, when a military officer interposed himself between us and the firing party. Ordering the police to desist, he said, "I am in command here. Enough lives have been lost, and I take these men prisoners of war."

The following week, Thomas Kent (aged 51) was convicted of the murder of Constable Rowe at court-martial in Victoria Barracks, Cork. On 9 May, he was executed by firing squad at the Barrack's Prison. His nerves were so bad on the morning of his execution that the guards had to bring a chair for him to sit upon. His body was then buried in quicklime in an unmarked plot in the prison yard. Richard Rice Kent died of his injuries on 4 May 1916.

David Kent was transferred to Richmond Barracks in Dublin, where he was sentenced to death but this sentence was later commuted to penal servitude for life. Subsequently, he was moved to HM Prison Pentonville in England. While there, his mother, Mary Rice Kent, died. He was released from prison by amnesty in 1917.

== Later years ==
At the 1918 general election, David Kent was elected unopposed as a Sinn Féin MP for the Cork East constituency. After the Irish War of Independence, he opposed the Anglo-Irish Treaty and voted against it. He was re-elected in Cork East at the 1922 general election and remained a member of parliament (TD) until the 1927 general election when his brother William ran in his place.

William was elected as a Fianna Fáil (TD) for the Cork East constituency at the September 1927 general election but was not reelected in 1932.

In the late 1920s, David Kent was sent to the United States to raise money for the Republican cause and he died shortly after his return. William Kent wrote "He was sent to America on a mission of propaganda on behalf of the I.R.A. He returned home after some months far poorer in health, and, after a life of struggle for the freedom of his country, this brave soldier and patriot died at his home at Bawnard on the 16th November, 1930."

At the 1933 general election, William was elected as a National Centre Party TD but did not run for re-election in 1937. William Kent died in 1957, he was 84 years old and was the "last survivor of the band of local Land League fighters".
