= David Kent =

David Kent may refer to:

- David Kent (politician) (1867–1930), Sinn Féin TD 1918–1927
- David Kent (historian) (born 1941), historian and creator of the Australian Kent Music Report
- David Kent (musician), past member of Hall & Oates band
