= James MacCarthy =

Irish sculptor and painter (1945–2019)

James MacCarthy Séamus Mac Cárṫaiġ
- Born: James Kieran Patrick MacCarthy; 5 March 1945; Dunmanway, Ireland
- Died: 15 July 2019 (aged 74)
- Education: National College of Art and Design
- Known for: Sculpture, Painting, Drawing, Ceramics
- Notable work: Danno O'Mahony, (Danno), Ballydehob, Cork. Thomas Kent, Memorial Bust, Cork (Kent) Railway station, Cork. Ballinasloe Horse Fair – Horse and Handler, Ballinasloe, Galway. Loughrea Uileann Piper, Loughrea, Galway.

James MacCarthy (Irish: Séamus MacCárṫaiġ; 5 March 1945 – 15 July 2019) was an Irish sculptor and painter. He is best known for his figurative work in bronze, as well as natural and marine subjects in copper and limestone. MacCarthy's sculpture range from small table top pieces to large public and corporate art works. Examples of his statues, monuments and plaques can be seen around Cork and Ireland, including a life-size bronze sculpture of Jack Lynch, Leader of Fianna Fáil and Irish Taoiseach, located in Blackpool, Cork.

MacCarthy's work has exhibited in many galleries in Ireland and the United Kingdom. His sculptural pieces also feature in collections such as RTÉ, The Arts Council, AIB, and The Office of Public Works; as well as private collections both in Ireland and abroad.

== Early life and education ==
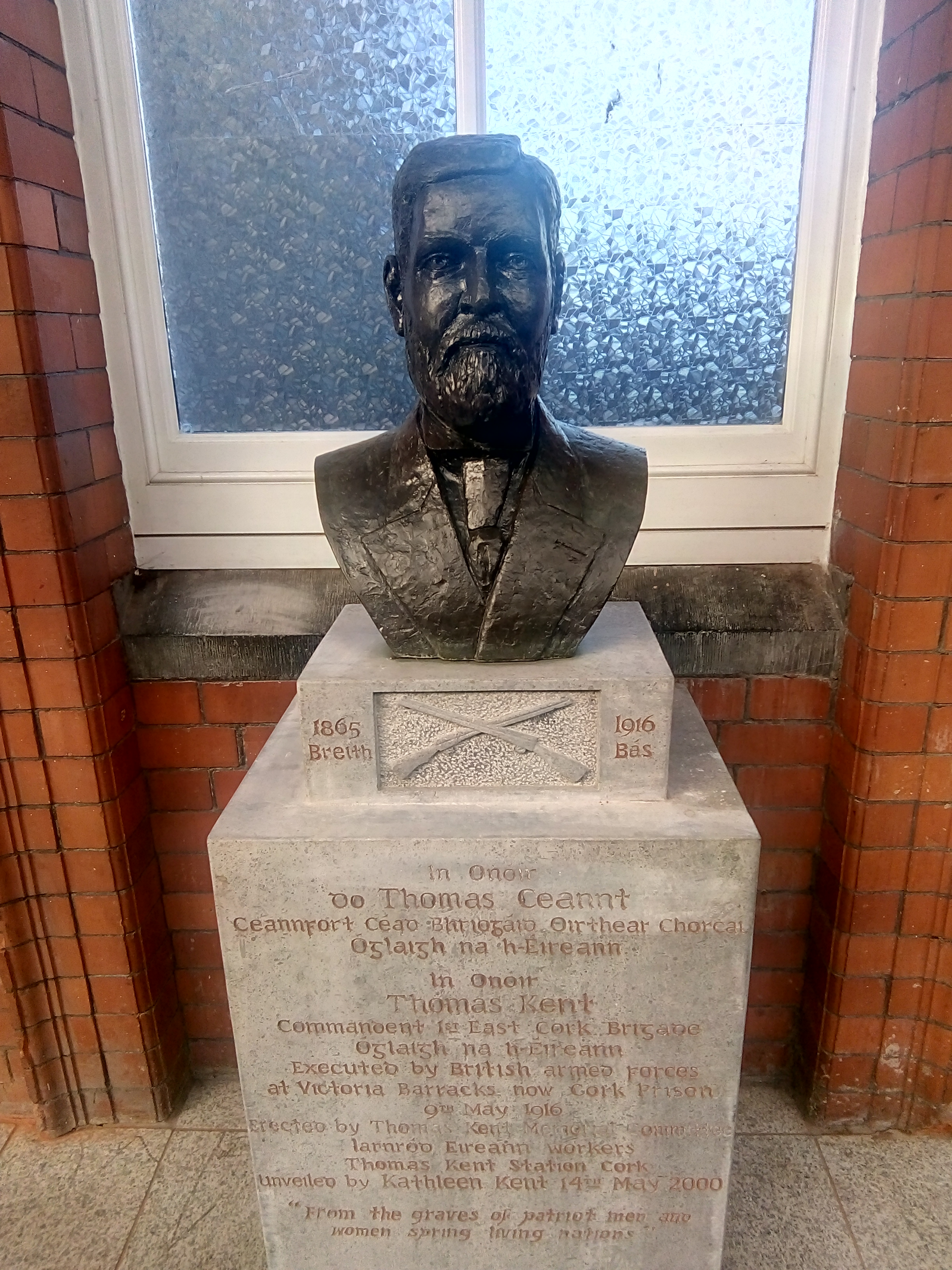
Thomas Kent, 1999, Cork Kent railway station, Cork.

James MacCarthy was born in Dunmanway, West Cork, the second son of merchant Eugene Charles (Hugh) MacCarthy and Anna Connolly. Through his father MacCarthy descends from MacCarthy Clan Dermod of Kilcoe and MacCarthy Glas of Gleannacroim. From an early age MacCarthy showed an ability for drawing, painting and modelling and expressed an interest in attending art college. However, his father required that his son should firstly study baking at the Borough Polytechnic Institute, London. Afterwards, MacCarthy attended the National College of Art and Design (NCAD) in Dublin from 1968 – 1970 at a time when the campus was based at Kildare Street, Dublin. It was at NCAD that he was taught the principles of sculpture under the tuition of Domhnall Ó Murchadha.

== Career ==
Early in his career MacCarthy worked solely in plaster with pieces varying in size from busts to half-size figures. An interest in ceramics and pottery led him to the Kilkenny Design workshop where his work looked to traditional Irish influences. MacCarthy remained in Kilkenny for a year, after which he set up a studio in Cork working primarily in ceramics. However, MacCarthy returned to figurative sculpture led by an inherent desire and attraction for creating expressive three-dimensional forms. MacCarthy also began bronze casting his work, which is a skilled process and labour-intensive, through mould making, and cast cleaning. Over a forty-year period MacCarthy was based out of his studio in Dunmanway where he worked on commissions and producing sculptural pieces for exhibition.

== Sculpture ==
=== Themes and style ===
A major theme of MacCarthy's was to explore the physicality of the female figure, something which was carried through his career, whether in the subject's private moments bathing or energetically modeling on the catwalk. Equestrian and marine subjects, animals of the Irish countryside, as well as aspects of Irish life such as the fair day were also creatively investigated.

MacCarthy's appreciation of Cellini, Rodin, Remington and Stubbs can be seen in his early-period bronze sculpture with the work taking a robust and sensitive modelling manner, which was also underscored by the medium of clay. In later years MacCarthy switched to modelling in wax which allowed him a quicker and freer approach and he evolved a more mannerist style with the forms exaggerated often resulting in compositions that were unnaturally elegant. While primarily working in clay, and wax, MacCarthy also examined his core themes through the different mediums of limestone, copper and wood, with the latter two materials being used for more playful sculptural pieces.

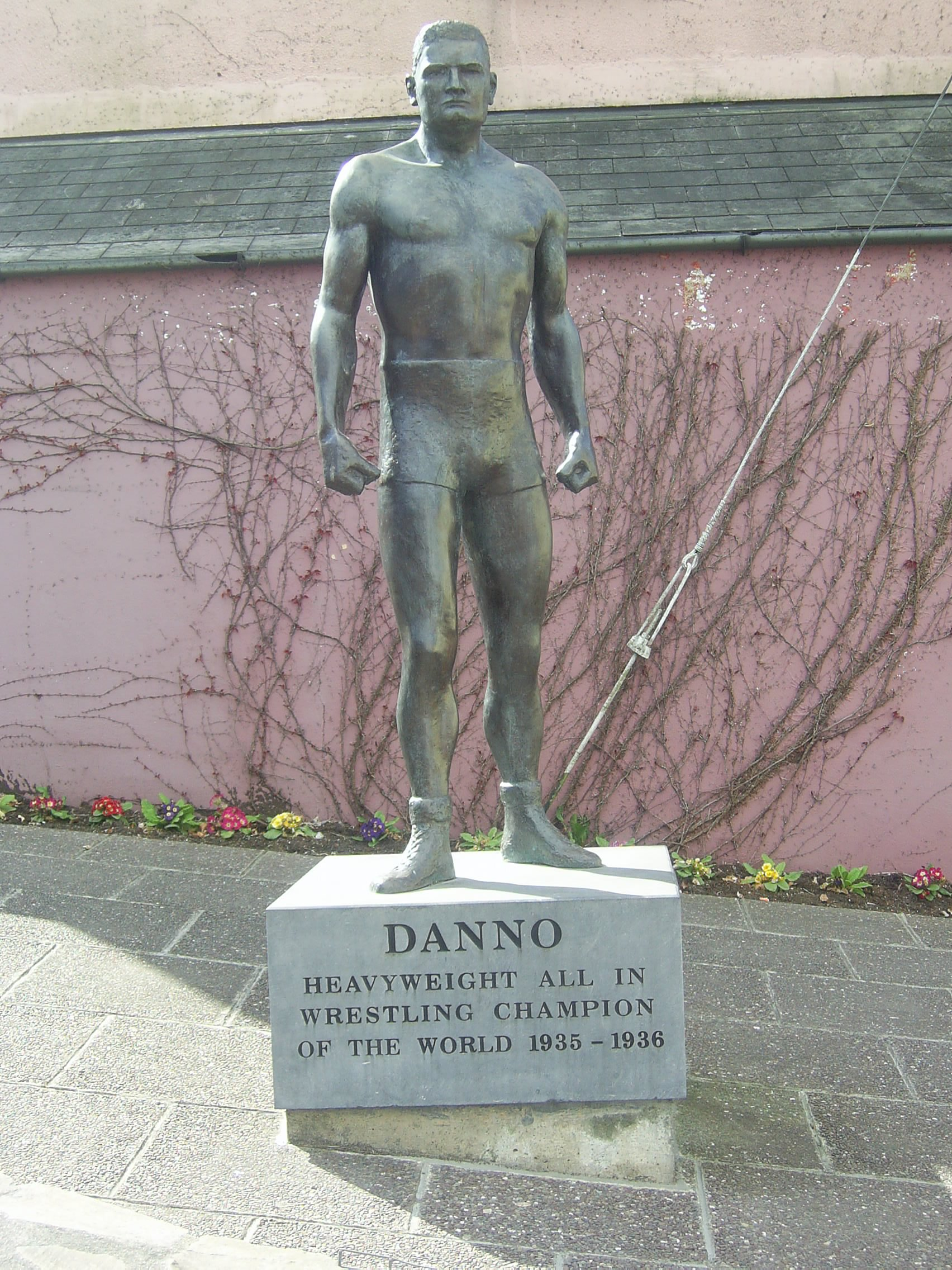
Danno O'Mahony, World Heavyweight Champion, 2001, Ballydehob, County Cork.

=== Commissions ===
Alongside gallery work, MacCarthy undertook public and private commissions. Some of these works included:

- Loughrea Uileann Piper, life-size male figure, bronze, Loughrea, Galway
- Ballinasloe Horse Fair – Horse and Handler, life-size horse and male figure, bronze, Ballinasloe, Galway
- Jack Lynch, B/L, T.D., An Taoiseach, life-size figure, bronze, Blackpool, Cork
- Danno O'Mahony – World Champion Wrestler, life-size male figure, bronze, Ballydehob, Cork
- Thomas Kent, life-size bust, bronze, Kent railway station, Cork
- Heron in the Reeds, limestone and bronze, Inchy Bridge, Timoleague, Cork
- Tony Reddin, low-relief portrait, bronze, Mullagh GAA Club, Galway
- Buttevent to Doneraile – First Recorded Steeplechase, commemorative plaque, bronze, Buttevent, Cork

== Painting ==
Primarily known as a sculptor, MacCarthy's output also extended to painting with his earliest work being conducted in this medium. While surrounding mountains and coastline of West Cork take prominence in MacCarthy's painting, the female figure also is a key subject either set within a location of landscape or interior. He painted primarily in oil or acrylic.

== Gallery ==
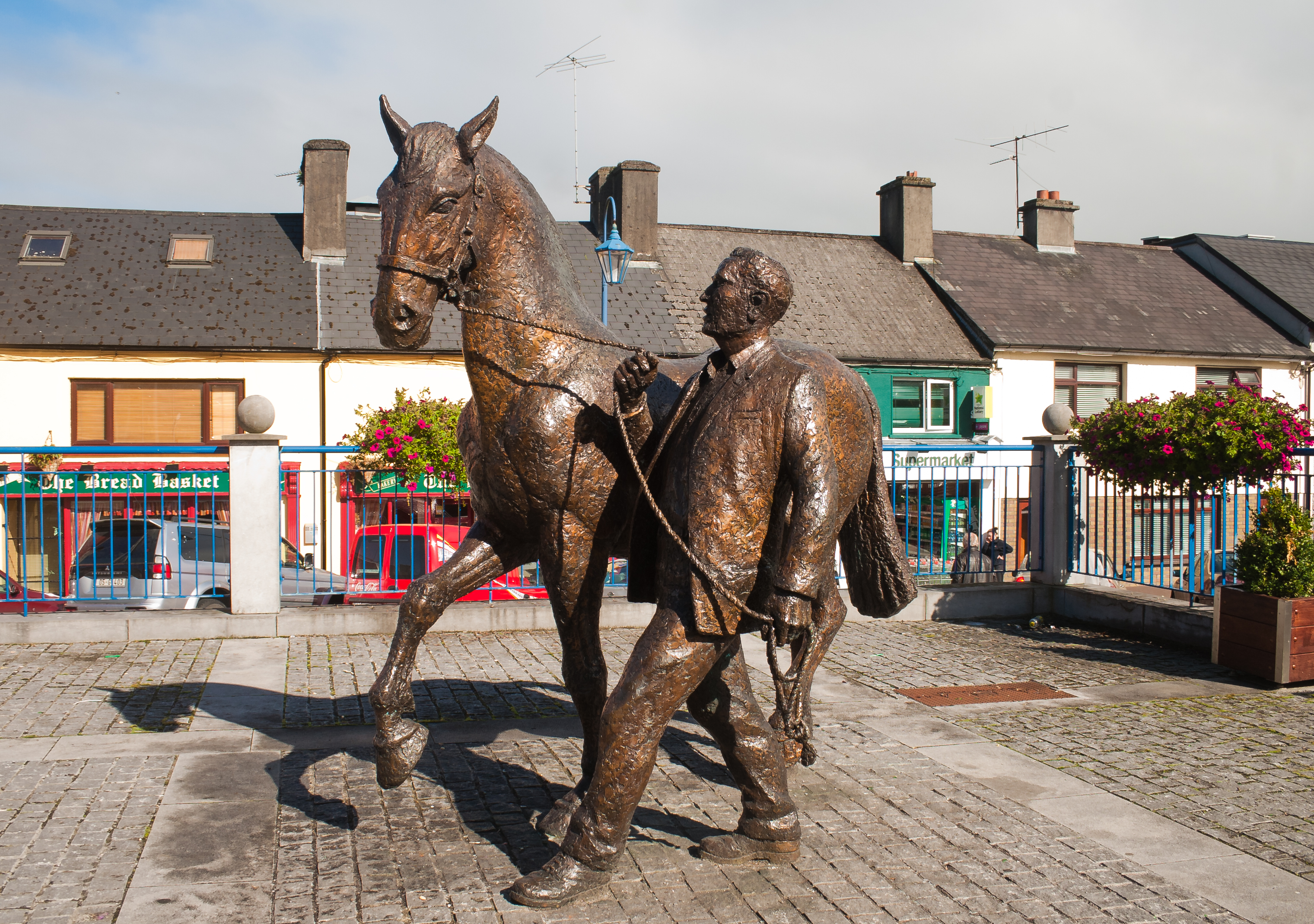
Ballinasloe Horse Fair – Horse and Handler, (Unique Bronze) Ballinasloe, Galway.

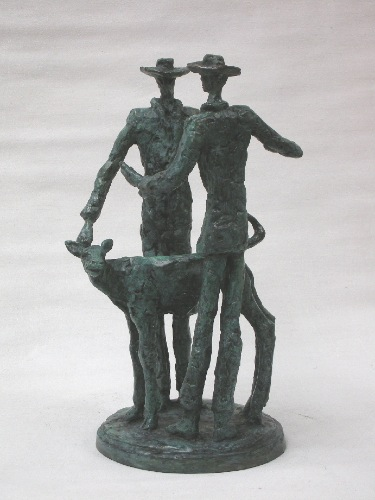
Selling the Calf (Bronze)
