= Cork Prison =

Prison in Ireland

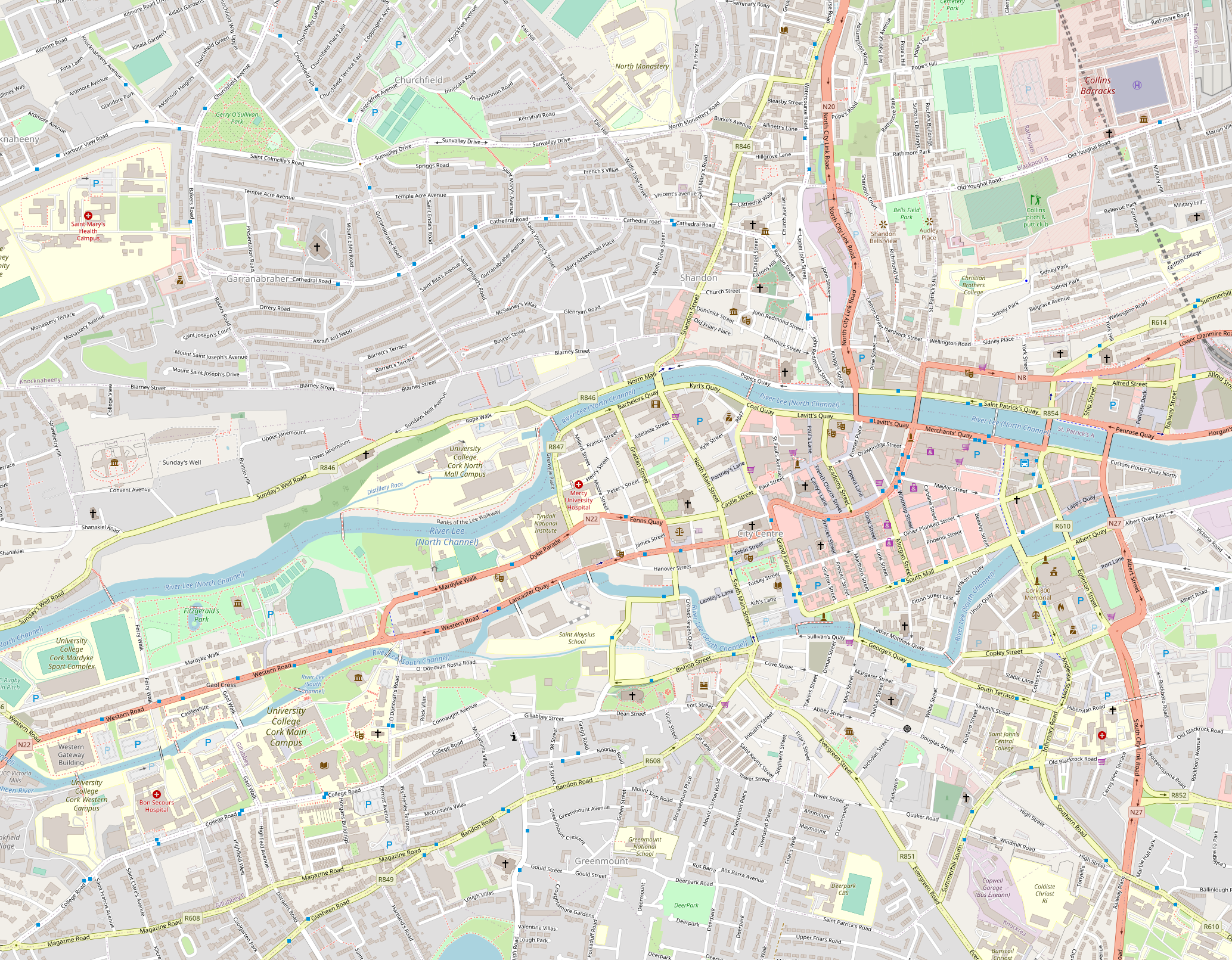
- Location within Cork Central
- Location: Rathmore Road, Cork City; 51.9088°N 8.4606°W
- Status: Operational
- Security class: Medium Security
- Capacity: 296
- Population: 262 (2022)
- Former name: Collins Barracks
- Managed by: Irish Prison Service
- Governor: Patrick Dawson

Cork Prison (Irish: Príosún Chorcaí) is an Irish penal institution on Rathmore Road, Cork City, Ireland. It is a closed, medium security prison for males over 17 years of age. As of 2022, it had a bed capacity of 296 and the daily average number of resident inmates was 262. It is immediately adjacent to Collins Barracks and near the Glen area of the city.

The current prison facility opened in 2016 as a €45m re-development, replacing a nearby 19th-century prison building. As of 2026, the site of the older prison building, which is closed to the public, is included in redevelopment plans to address prison overcrowding.

== History ==
=== Detention Barracks (1806) ===
In 1806 a military barracks was opened by the British Government on Rathmore Road, Cork City, the new complex included a Detention Barracks for use by the military.

In 1916, during a round-up following the Easter Rising, the RIC went to arrest the nationalist Kent family at their home in Castleyons, County Cork. The family resisted and in an ensuing shoot-out, Richard Kent and Constable William Rowe were killed. The following week Thomas Kent was convicted of the murder of Constable Rowe. He was executed and buried at the military prison of Victoria Barracks (now Cork Prison).

During the Irish War of Independence a number of executions were carried out at the prison and nearby barracks. Following independence in 1922, the barracks and the associated prison were taken over by the Irish Government and the complex was renamed Collins Army Barracks.

The detention barracks remained in the possession of the Irish Army until 1972.

=== Cork Prison (1972) ===
The military prison buildings, previously part of the broader barracks, were handed over to the Department of Justice for use as a civil prison. Collins Barracks itself remained in the control of the Irish Army, with the prison facility serviced with separate access via Rathmore Road.

The prison facility opened as a committal prison after considerable refurbishment in 1983.

In the following decades, overcrowding became an issue. Though the official bed capacity was 272, in 2009 for example, the prison had a daily average inmate population of 298. The practice of "slopping out" was noted as a concern, and in 2011 a visiting committee described some parts of the 19th century facility as "archaic and Dickensian".

The old Cork Prison building closed on 12 February 2016 after 210 years of operation as a military detention facility (since 1806) and a civilian prison (since 1972).

It has since been used as a filming location, including for the films Maze (2017) and Michael Inside (2017).

=== "New" Cork Prison (2016) ===
In 2016, the older prison buildings were replaced by a new facility - constructed directly across Rathmore Road from the original prison. The new €45m prison facility is located on a 6-acre site. Built by PJ Hegarty and Sons in 20 months, it has improved monitoring facilities, and an operational capacity of 310 inmates.

James Collins retired as Governor of Cork prison in March 2016 and has been replaced by Governor Patrick Dawson.

=== Proposed expansion ===
As part of government plans to spend €495 million on prison development across Ireland, it was announced in 2026 that the existing "old" Cork Prison (closed in 2016) would be redeveloped into a new section of the existing "new" Cork Prison. As of May 2026, preparatory work was scheduled to begin during 2027, with Justice Minister Jim O'Callaghan suggesting that he was "hoping and expecting that it will be completed in advance of 2031". The proposed project attracted criticism from Sinn Féin TD Thomas Gould.

In November 2026, the Irish Examiner reported that parts of the "old" Cork Prison were set to be partially demolished with the gatehouse, stone bastion features and old prison walls due to be preserved.

== See also ==
- Prisons in Ireland
