= William N. Rowe =

William Neil Rowe
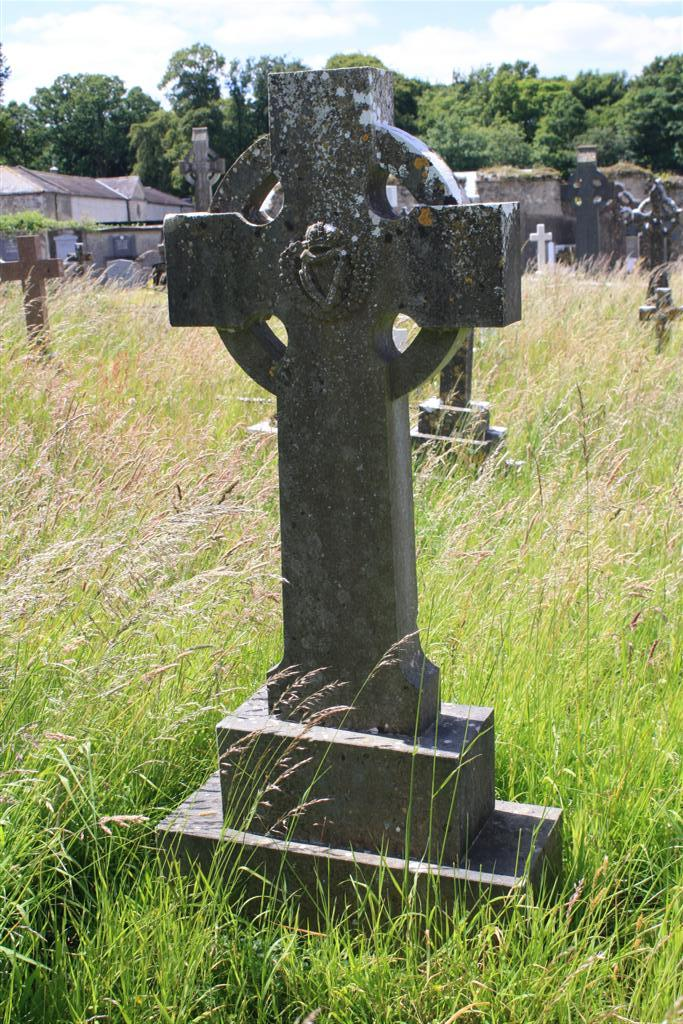
- Rowe's tombstone at Castlehyde Cemetery
- Born: 1867; County Wexford, Ireland
- Died: 2 May 1916 (aged 48–49); Bawnard House, Castlelyons, County Cork, Ireland
- Military career
- Allegiance: Royal Irish Constabulary
- Rank: Head Constable
- Conflicts: Easter Rising

William Neil Rowe (1867 – 2 May 1916) was a member of the Royal Irish Constabulary (RIC), fatally shot during a police raid on the home of the Kent family at Castlelyons, County Cork.

== Death ==
The event took place in the immediate aftermath of the Easter Rising, when the Authorities began to arrest Republican sympathisers. As the raid unfolded, the Kent brothers refused to be taken into custody, a firefight occurred which resulted in the death of Rowe and also the fatal wounding of Richard Kent as he attempted to flee.

== Aftermath ==
Rowe is buried at the Church of Ireland graveyard at Castlehyde near Fermoy. He left behind a widow and five children under the age of sixteen. Thomas and William Kent were tried by court martial on the charge of his murder. William was acquitted, but Thomas was sentenced to death and executed by firing squad at Cork on 9 May 1916. In 2015 he was given a state funeral.

== Sources ==
- Hart, Peter; The IRA and its Enemies: Violence and Community in Cork, 1916–1923, Oxford University Press (1998). ISBN 0-19-820806-5 (Pages 48–49)
- Kiberd, Declan (editor), 1916 Rebellion Handbook Dublin: Mourne River Press, 1998. ISBN 1-902090-05-5
