= Michael Fitzgerald (Irish republican) =

Irish republican (1881-1920)

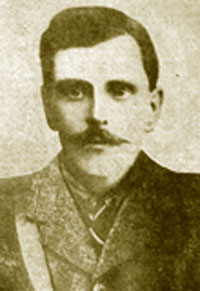
Mick Fitzgerald

Michael Fitzgerald also known as Mick Fitzgerald, (December 1881 – 17 October 1920) was an Irish militant and Republican activist who was among the first members of the Irish Republican Army (IRA) and played a significant role in organising it. He rose to the rank of Commandant, Officer Commanding (OC) in the First Battalion, Cork Number 2 Brigade. He died during the 1920 Cork hunger strike at Cork Gaol. Fitzgerald led 65 men in the hunger strike which was in protest at their detention without being either charged or convicted of any crime. The hunger strike is credited with bringing additional world-wide attention to the Irish cause for independence.

== Early life ==
Born in Ballyoran, Fermoy, County Cork, Fitzgerald was educated at the Christian Brothers school in the town and subsequently found work as a mill worker in the locality. He joined the Irish Volunteers in 1914 and was involved in building the local organisation – which later became the IRA. He rose to the rank of Battalion Commandant, 1st Battalion, Cork No.2 Brigade.

== IRA activities ==
On Easter Sunday 20 April 1919, Michael Fitzgerald led a small group of IRA volunteers who captured the Royal Irish Constabulary barracks at Araglin in County Cork on the border with County Tipperary. He was subsequently arrested and sentenced to three months imprisonment at Cork Gaol. Fitzgerald was released from prison in August 1919 and immediately returned to active IRA duty. He was involved in the holding up of a party of British Army troops at the Wesleyan church in Fermoy. The troops were disarmed and one of them was killed.Arrested and held on remand, Mick Fitzgerald felt that the only chance he had for release was via a hunger strike.

== 1920 hunger strike ==
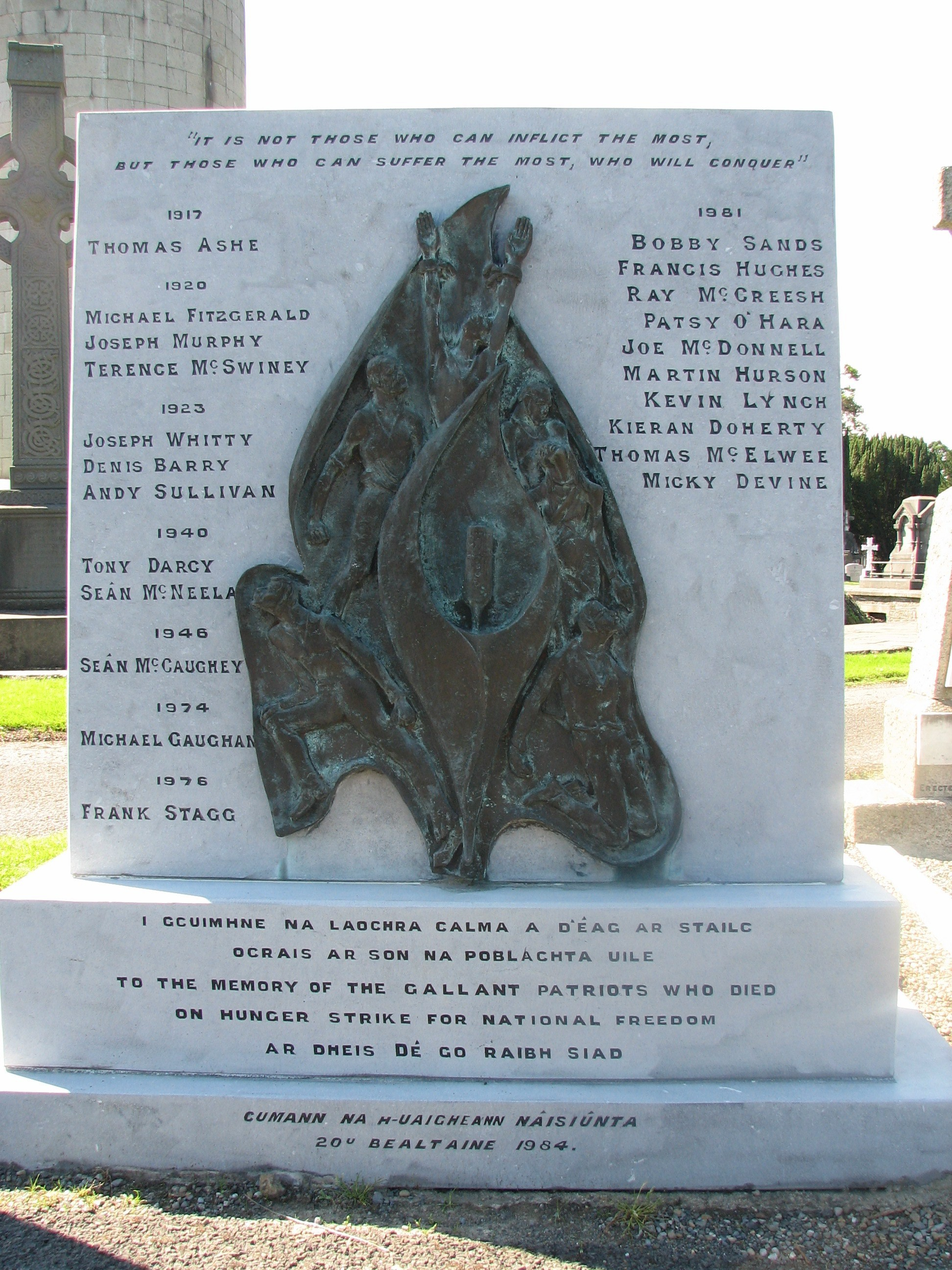
Hunger strike memorial, mentioning Michael Fitzgerald, in Dublin's Glasnevin Cemetery

Michael Fitzgerald, along with Terence MacSwiney and nine other IRA volunteers, were arrested on 8 August 1920. On 11 August 1920, MacSwiney began a hunger strike in Brixton Gaol. Fitzgerald and the other nine volunteers at Cork Gaol joined the strike. Twenty-four-year-old Fitzgerald was the first to die on 17 October 1920 as a result of his sixty seven day fast. Days before his death, the authorities refused Fitzgerald permission to marry his fiancée. He was followed by Joe Murphy and Terence McSwiney. Their deaths are credited with bringing world-wide attention to the Irish cause for independence and occurred before the largest hunger strike in Irish history - the 1923 Irish Hunger Strikes.

== Gravesite ==
Michael Fitzgerald is buried at Kilcrumper Cemetery, on the outskirts of Fermoy. A road was also named after him in Togher, Cork.

Also buried in the Republican Plot in Fermoy is Liam Lynch, who was killed by Free State troops in April 1923. His last wish was to be buried with his friend and comrade, Mick Fitzgerald.

During a November 2008 visit to Fermoy, County Cork, then Sinn Féin vice-president Pat Doherty laid a wreath at Fitzgerald's grave. In a speech, he compared Fitzgerald's sacrifice to that of the 1981 hunger strikers.

== See also ==
- Timeline of the Irish War of Independence
