= Maurice Moore (Irish republican) =

Maurice Moore (15 June 1894 – 28 April 1921) was an Irish republican who fought in the Irish War of Independence. In April 1921 Moore was executed in the military prison of Victoria Barracks (now Cork Prison) after being captured in the aftermath of the Clonmult Ambush.

Moore was born on 15 June 1894 at Castle Oliver, Cobh, County Cork, the son of Michael Moore, a labourer, and Mary Foley. He was educated at the local Presentation Brothers National School and after school began work as a plumber's mate at Haulbowline dockyard (then a British naval establishment).

His family had strong republican connections and he joined Irish Volunteers in Cobh in 1916. Three of his brothers were also members and they all subsequently served with the Irish Republican Army as members of the 4th Battalion, Cork No.1 Brigade.

As a member of the Cobh Company of the IRA Moore took part in the capture of Carrigtwohill Royal Irish Constabulary (RIC) barracks which was the first police barracks captured by republicans in the War of Independence. He was later involved in the capture of Cloyne RIC barracks and numerous other actions of the local IRA against British crown forces.

In February 1921 Moore was one of a flying column of over 20 IRA men billeted in an old farmhouse at Clonmult, near Midleton under Commandant Diarmuid Hurley. They were tracked down and surrounded by a company of the Hampshire Regiment of the British Army and RIC, Black and Tans and Auxiliaries. In the ensuing gunfight 12 of the republicans were killed and eight captured, including Maurice Moore.

The group were given a military court-martial and all were sentenced to death. Seven of them later had their sentences commuted but two, Moore and his lifelong friend Paddy O'Sullivan were executed by hanging Victoria Barracks, Cork on 28 April 1921. In the hope of preventing the executions, the IRAs Cork No 1 Brigade held British Army Major Compton Smith of the Royal Welch Fusiliers as a hostage. On the same day of Moore's execution, Major Smith was executed by the IRA.

== Sources ==
- http://homepage.eircom.net/~corkcounty/Timeline.htm
- Cork Jail Memorial Souvenir (pamphlet), 1948, Cló na Laoí (The Lee Press), Cork
