= Clonmult ambush =

Engagement during the Irish War of Independence in 1921

- Part of Irish War of Independence
Date	20 February 1921
Location	Clonmult (near Midleton), County Cork 51.995°N 8.105°W
Result	British victory

Belligerents
(United Kingdom of Great Britain and Ireland) British Army (Hampshire Regiment) (United Kingdom of Great Britain and Ireland) Royal Irish Constabulary (Auxiliary Division)	Irish Republican Army (1st Cork Brigade)

Commanders and leaders
(United Kingdom of Great Britain and Ireland) Lieut. A. R. Koe	Jack O'Connell

Strength
Initially one infantry company, reinforcements arrived during the action	20 volunteers

Casualties and losses
2 killed (at least)	12 killed 4 wounded 4 captured (2 later executed)
- 6 suspected civilian informers executed by the IRA in the following week
- Location within island of Ireland

The Clonmult ambush took place on 20 February 1921, during the Irish War of Independence.

Irish Republican Army (IRA) volunteers occupying a remote, disused farmhouse near Clonmult, County Cork were surrounded by a force of British Army, Royal Irish Constabulary and Auxiliaries. In the action that followed, twelve IRA volunteers were killed, four wounded and four captured. A total of 22 people died in the ambush, subsequent execution of two of the IRA volunteers and the executions of alleged informers – 14 IRA members, 2 Black and Tans and 6 suspected informers.

== Background ==
The 4th battalion of the IRA First Cork Brigade, under Diarmuid O'Hurley and based around Midleton, Youghal and Cobh, had been a successful unit up until the Clonmult ambush. They had captured three RIC barracks and carried out an ambush in Midleton itself. In January 1921, the unit took possession of a disused farmhouse overlooking the village of Clonmult. O'Hurley planned to ambush a military train at Cobh Junction on Tuesday 22 February 1921 and at the time of the Clonmult action was scouting a suitable ambush site. However, according to historian Peter Hart, they "had become over-confident and fallen into a traceable routine". An intelligence officer of the British Army Hampshire Regiment traced them to their billet at a farmhouse in Clonmult

== The battle ==
British troops (a party of the 2nd Battalion, Hampshire Regiment under the command of Lieutenant A. R. Koe) surrounded the house. Two IRA volunteers noticed the advancing troops and opened fire. Both were killed, but the shooting had warned those sheltering inside the house, and a siege began. A sortie from the house was attempted in the hope of gaining reinforcements from the local IRA company.

The acting IRA commander, Jack O'Connell (Captain, Cobh Company), managed to get away but three other volunteers were killed in the attempt. O'Connell was unable to bring help in time. The Volunteers trapped inside made a desperate but unsuccessful attempt to escape through a narrow opening in the gable. Their hopes were dashed when British reinforcements arrived instead—regular RIC police, Black and Tans and Auxiliaries. The police had also brought petrol, which an Army officer used to set the thatched roof of the farmhouse alight. With the farmhouse burning around them, an attempt was then made by the IRA to surrender.

== 'Kilmichael in reverse'? ==
What happened next is disputed. In his after-action report, Lieutenant Koe wrote:

(14) At 18.20 hours the rebels signified that they wished to surrender and they were ordered to put up their hands and come out one by one. At 18.30 hours, six or seven rebels came out with their hands up and the crown forces went to meet them. On this fire was again opened by the remaining rebels in the house.

(15) Fire was at once re-opened on the house by the Crown Forces, and, in the cross fire which resulted, it was inevitable that casualties should be inflicted on the rebels outside the house by both sides. The Crown Forces, having re-opened fire, rushed to the house. When the house was captured, there were eight men in it, four wounded and four unwounded. These were taken prisoner.

In its official communique, General Headquarters merely stated that some of the IRA Volunteers "came running out of the house, with their hands up, while others continued to fire on the Crown Forces as they went to accept the surrender." But in his monthly confidential report, the local county inspector of the Royal Irish Constabulary accused the Volunteers of treachery, saying that some "had tried to escape by a ruse. Some came from the building while those that remained inside opened fire on the police and military." By contrast, the surviving Volunteers claimed that their men had surrendered in good faith, and had come out with their hands up, only to be shot by the police without any provocation. Patrick Higgins, an IRA man who survived the killings, recalled:

We were lined up alongside an outhouse with our hands up. The Tans came along and shot every man with the exception of three...who were saved by the officer in charge of the military party. A Tan put his revolver to my mouth and fired [he was wounded in the jaw]...Only for the military officer coming along, I would be gone.

Opinion is divided amongst historians as to which version of the story to believe: Peter Hart, for example, wrote that, "The Irish survivors testified convincingly that there had been no treachery on their part." However, he also compared what happened at Clonmult to what happened at the Kilmichael ambush on 28 November 1920, suggesting that Clonmult could be described as "Kilmichael in reverse", the IRA members intending to surrender but the security forces not realising it.

In his book The Battle of Clonmult: The IRA's Worst Defeat, Tom O'Neill suggests the shooting of IRA members may have been the result of a misunderstanding. Before the Volunteers gave up and came out, their commander had ordered them to throw their rifles into the fire: and what the police mistook for treachery may have been ammunition cooking off in the heat of the flames. "The other possibility," as O'Neill notes, "is that the British were just attempting to cover up their tracks with falsehoods."

A total of twelve IRA Volunteers were killed in the action, with four more wounded and only four taken prisoner unscathed. Two of the IRA prisoners (Maurice Moore and Paddy O'Sullivan) were later executed in the Cork military barracks on 28 April. Patrick Higgins was sentenced to death but was reprieved due to the truce that ended the war on 11 July.

Hampshire Regiment historian Scott Daniell noted on the action that "like all the Irish operations, it was hateful to the British troops".

== Aftermath ==
The IRA suspected that an informer had led the British to the billet of the column wiped out at Clonmult, and over the following week, six alleged spies were executed by the IRA in the surrounding area. Mick Leahy, a local IRA officer, stated that "things went to hell in the battalion" after Clonmult. Diarmuid O'Hurley, the commander of the battalion, was not at Clonmult but was later killed on 28 May 1921.
