= Castlelyons Friary =

Ruined Carmelite priory in Cork, Ireland

- Prióireacht Chaisleán Ó Liatháin
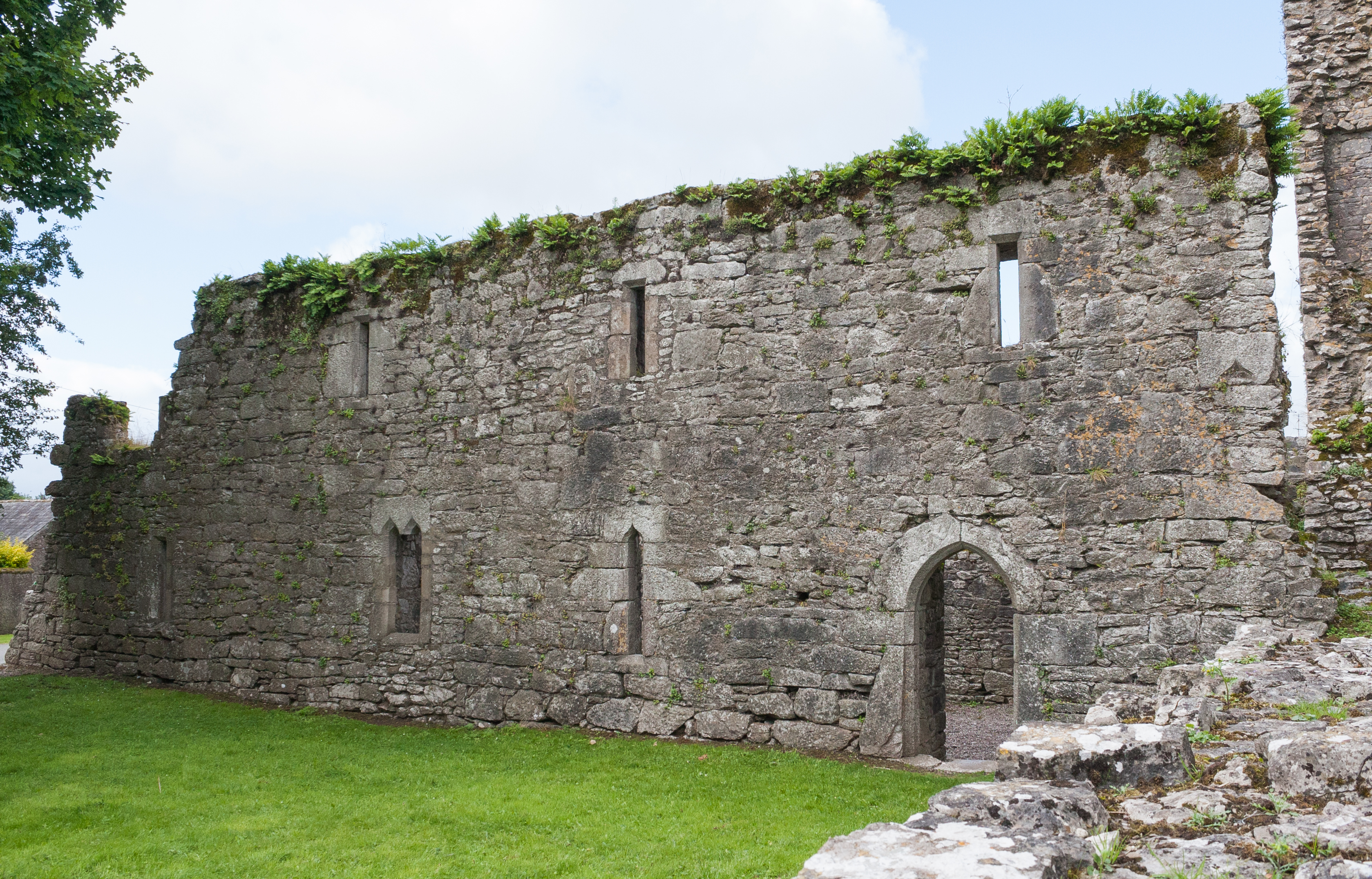
- East wing

- Location within Ireland
- Interactive map of Castlelyons Friary

Monastery information
- Other names: Castelio, Castleyhane, Castelleaghan, Castrileonensis
- Order: Carmelites
- Established: 1307–09 / 1324
- Disestablished: 1760
- Diocese: Cloyne

People
- Founder: John de Barry, 4th Baron Barry

Architecture
- Status: ruined
- Style: Norman

Site
- Location: Mohera, Castlelyons, County Cork
- Coordinates: 52.089148°N 8.233480°W
- Public access: yes

Castlelyons Friary is a former Carmelite Priory and National Monument located in County Cork, Ireland.

== Location ==
Castlelyons Friary is located 6.6 km (4.1 mi) south-southeast of Fermoy, south of the Munster Blackwater.

== History ==
The Carmelite friary was founded at Castlelyons c. 1307–09 by John de Barry, 4th Baron Barry, during the reign of Edward II as Lord of Ireland. He had been granted license by the king to alienate land for the Carmelites of Drogheda on 11 August 1309, but was without papal license until Pope John XXII granted one in 1324, and then the friary could be built. Later the friary was granted 20 marks (£13 6 s. 8 d.) per annum to be taken from the people of the town.

The friary name has no connection to Lyon or lions; it derives from the ancient kingdom of Uí Liatháin in which it lies.

Originally the friary had just a small church dedicated to the Blessed Virgin Mary. Later it was extended westwards by a nave, cloister and tower.

It was dissolved in 1541 during Henry VIII's Dissolution of the Monasteries and annexed to the crown in 1561. The land was granted to James de Barry, 4th Viscount Buttevant in 1568.

In 1638 windows were taken from Castlelyons and placed in Lismore Cathedral. Ariybd this time Castlelyons was granted to Richard Boyle, 1st Earl of Cork; he in turn gave it to his daughter Alice (1607–1667).

In 1683 Laurence Barry, 3rd Earl of Barrymore granted Castlelyons Friary to the Dominican Order.

The friary was re-established in 1737. The last prior, John O'Neil, died in 1760. It was later used as a hedge school.

When it was visited by John Windele in the mid-19th century the locals were using the nave to play handball.

Some restoration was done by the Office of Public Works in the 1930s.

== Building ==
The surviving buildings, mostly dating to the 15th century, are the nave, half the tower, parts of the dormitory. In the chancel there is a stone altar. In the west gable is a pointed doorway. Above it is a two-light window with ogee heads.

Castlelyons Friary

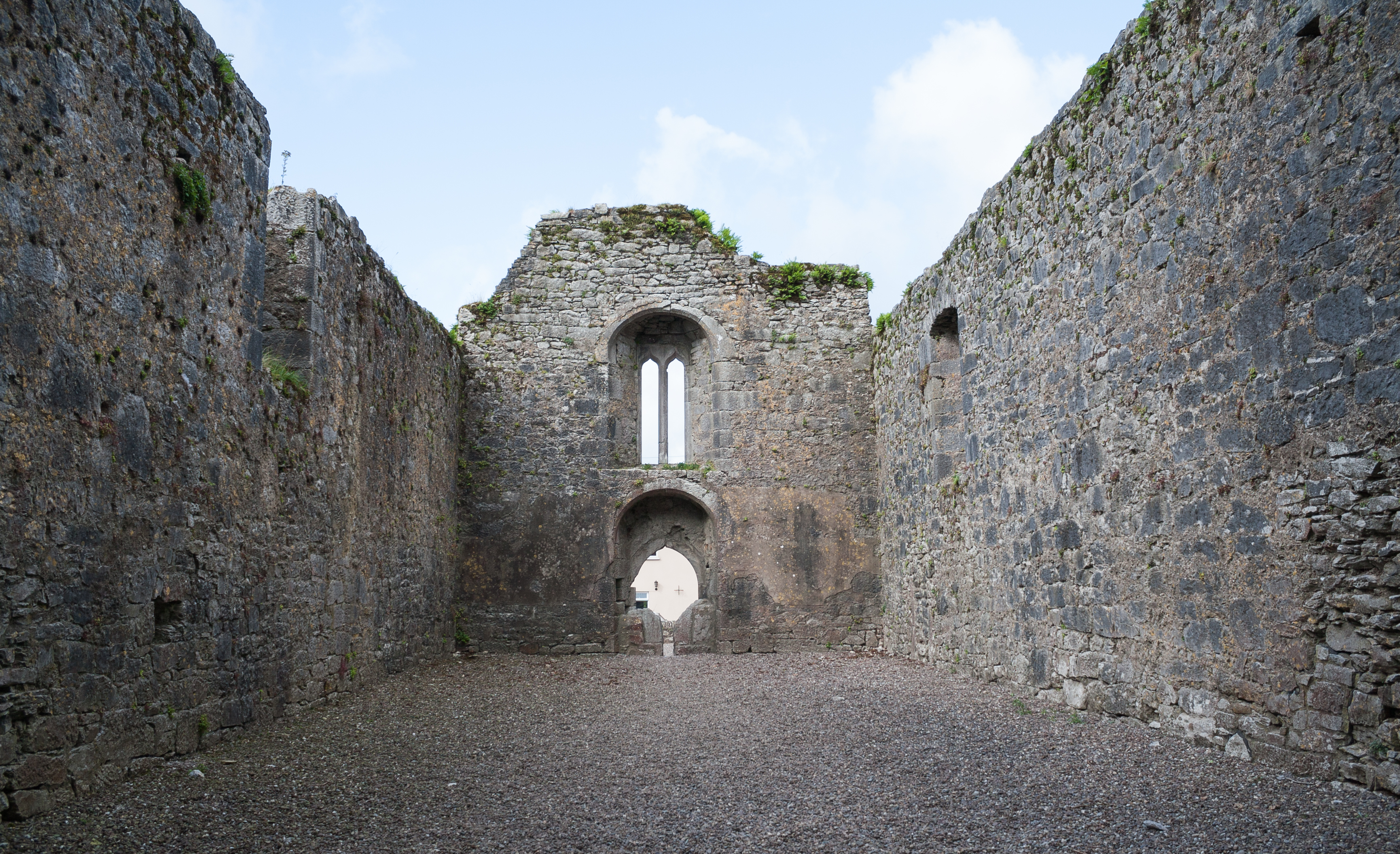
View of nave

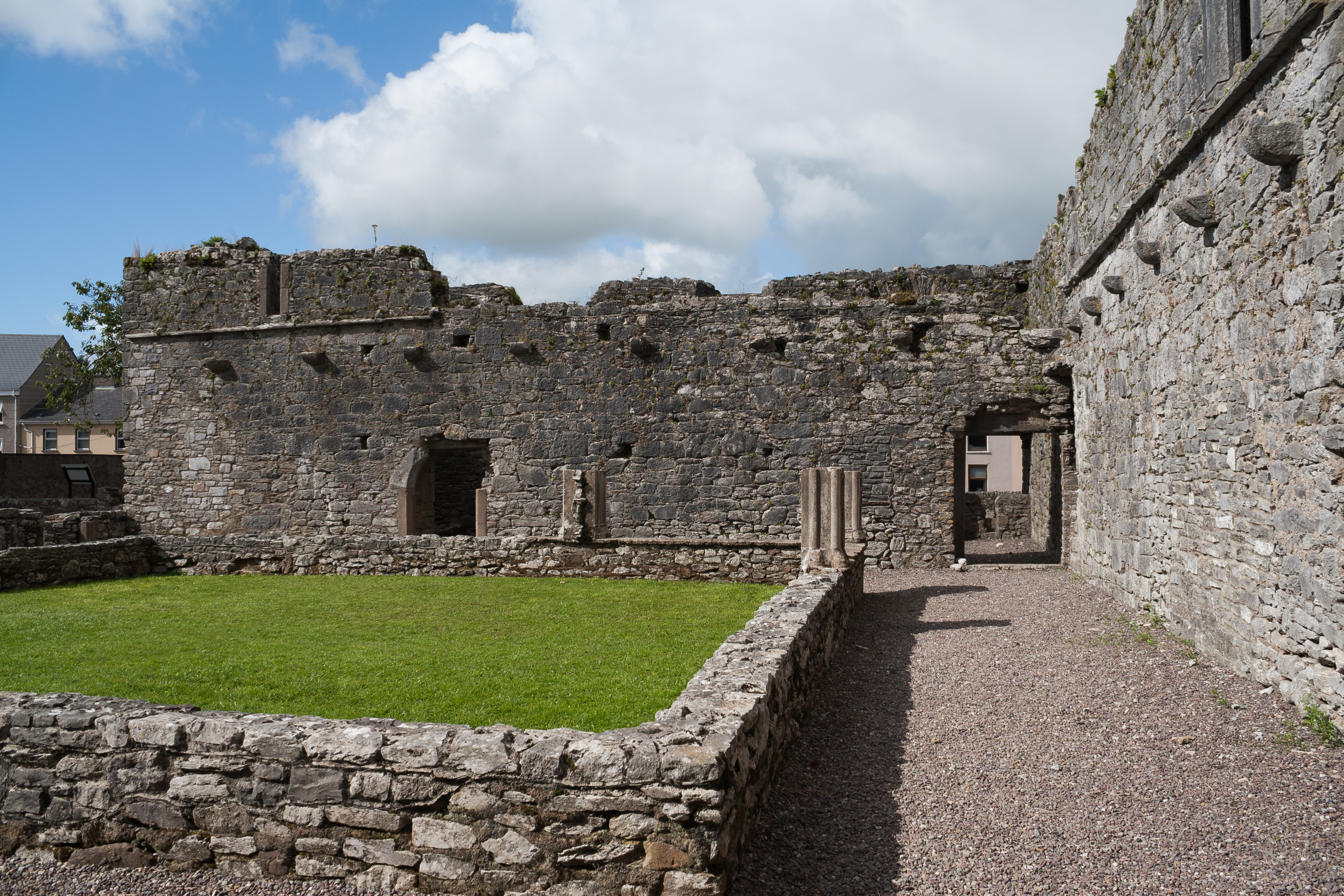
Remnants of the cloister

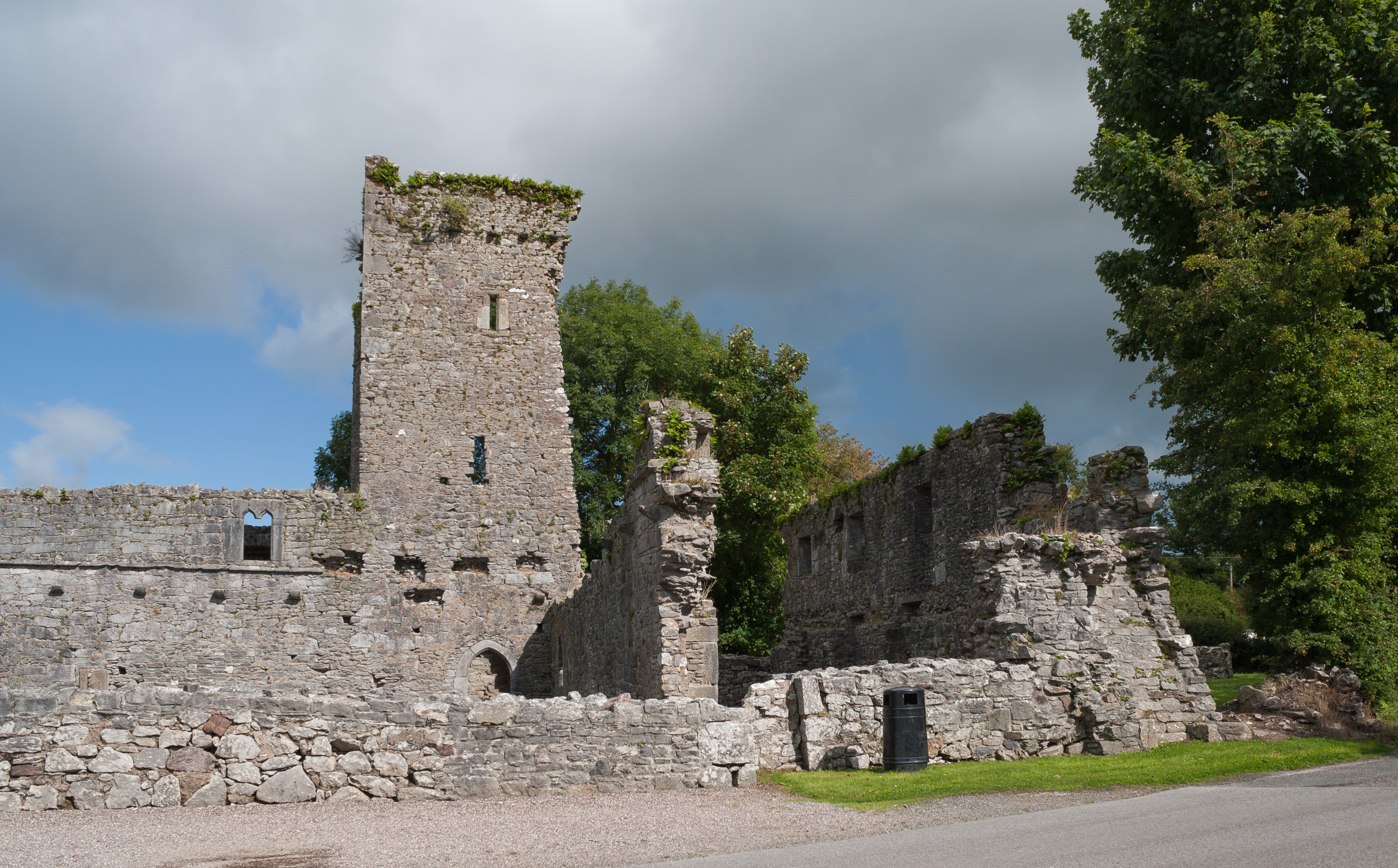
Tower and dormitory

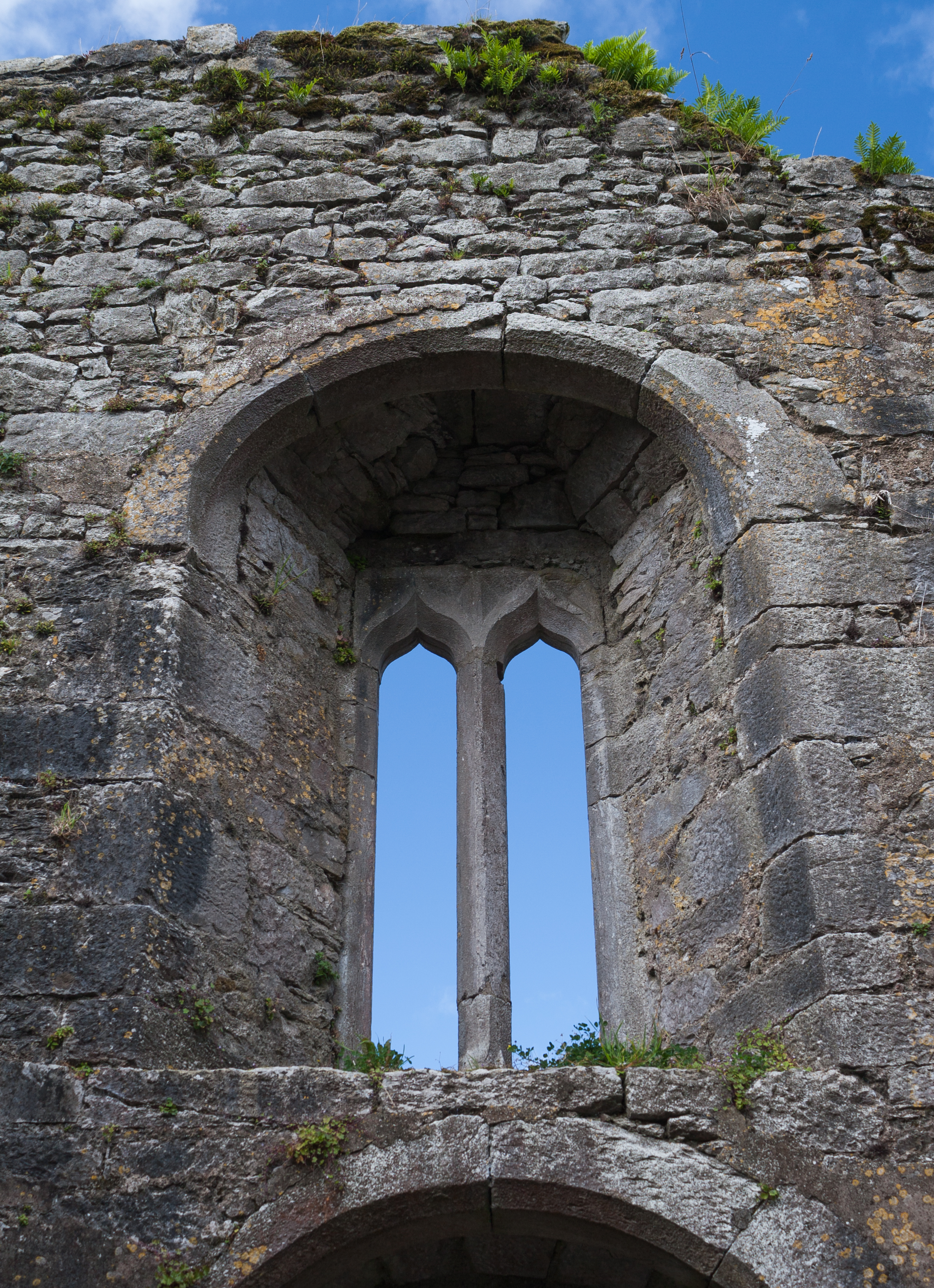
West window

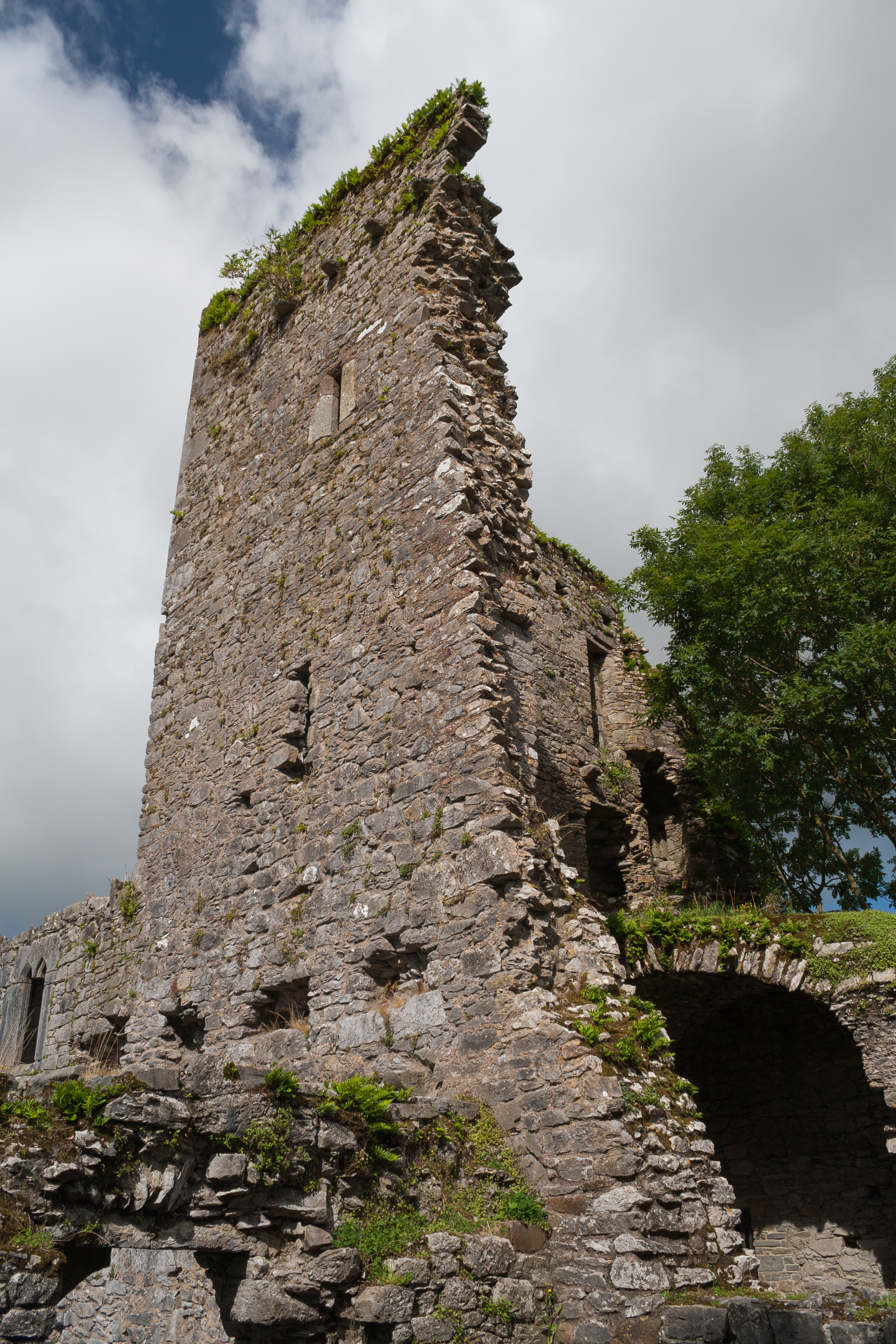
Tower

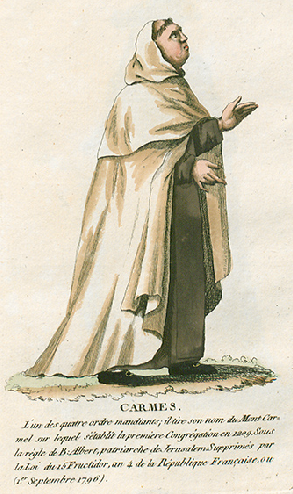
Habit of a Carmelite friar (French illustration, 1811)
