= David Kent (politician) =

Irish politician (1867–1930)

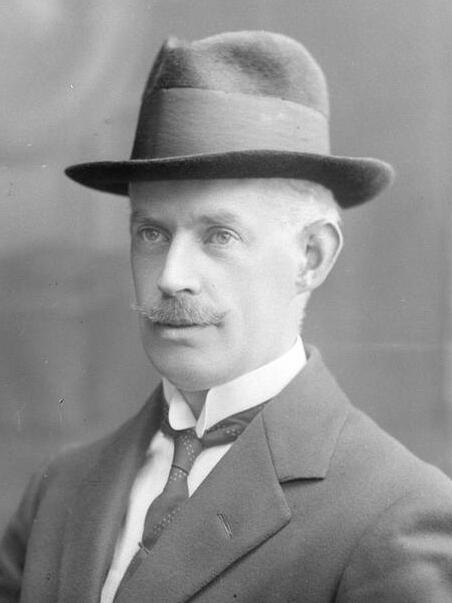
- Kent, c.1920s

Teachta Dála
- In office August 1923 – September 1927
- Constituency: Cork East
- In office May 1921 – August 1923
- Constituency: Cork East and North East
- In office December 1918 – May 1921
- Constituency: Cork East

Personal details
- Born: 2 February 1867 Castlelyons, County Cork, Ireland
- Died: 16 November 1930 (aged 63) County Cork, Ireland
- Party: Sinn Féin
- Relatives: Thomas Kent (brother); William Kent (brother)

David Rice Kent (also known as David Ceannt; 2 February 1867 – 16 November 1930) was an Irish Sinn Féin politician.

He was born on 2 February 1867 in Coole, Castlelyons, County Cork, to David Kent and Mary Rice.

On 2 May 1916, David Kent, his mother Mrs Rice Kent and three brothers—Thomas, William and Richard—were involved in a gunfight with members of the Royal Irish Constabulary (RIC) during an arrest operation following the Easter Rising in Dublin. When the supply of ammunition being loaded by Mrs Rice Kent was at its end, Richard attempted to escape but was shot and died from his wounds within several days. Thomas was not charged with armed rebellion but with "wilful murder", executed by firing squad and buried in the Detention Barracks. David was transferred to Richmond Barracks in Dublin, where he was sentenced to death, though later was reduced to penal servitude for life. Subsequently, he was moved to Pentonville Prison in England though released from there within the year.

David Kent was elected unopposed as a Sinn Féin MP for the East Cork constituency at the 1918 general election. In January 1919, Sinn Féin MPs refused to recognise the Parliament of the United Kingdom and instead assembled at the Mansion House in Dublin as a revolutionary parliament called Dáil Éireann, though Kent did not attend. He was elected unopposed as a Sinn Féin Teachta Dála (TD) for the Cork East and North East constituency at the 1921 elections. He opposed the Anglo-Irish Treaty and voted against it.

He was re-elected for the same constituency at the 1922 general election, this time as an anti-Treaty Sinn Féin TD, and he did not sit in the Dáil from this time onwards. He was elected as a Republican TD for Cork East constituency at the 1923 general election. He was elected as one of five Sinn Féin TDs at the June 1927 general election. He did not contest the September 1927 general election.

His brother William Kent was also a TD in the 1920s and 1930s.

He died on 16 November 1930 at Bawnard, Castlelyons, County Cork.

== See also ==
- Families in the Oireachtas

Parliament of the United Kingdom
Preceded by John Muldoon	Member of Parliament for Cork East; 1918–1922	Constituency abolished
Oireachtas
New constituency	Teachta Dála for Cork East; 1918–1921	Constituency abolished

Dáil	Election	Deputy (Party)	Deputy (Party)	Deputy (Party)
2nd	1921	Séamus Fitzgerald (SF)	Thomas Hunter (SF)	David Kent (SF)
3rd	1922	John Dinneen (FP)	Michael Hennessy (BP)	David Kent (AT-SF)
4th	1923	Constituency abolished. See Cork East and Cork North		

Dáil	Election	Deputy (Party)	Deputy (Party)	Deputy (Party)	Deputy (Party)	Deputy (Party)
4th	1923	John Daly (Ind.)	Michael Hennessy (CnaG)	David Kent (Rep)	John Dinneen (FP)	Thomas O'Mahony (CnaG)
4th	1924 by-election	John Daly (Ind.)	Michael Hennessy (CnaG)	David Kent (Rep)	John Dinneen (FP)	Michael K. Noonan (CnaG)
5th	1927 (Jun)	John Daly (Ind.)	Michael Hennessy (CnaG)	David Kent (SF)	David O'Gorman (FP)	Martin Corry (FF)
6th	1927 (Sep)	John Daly (CnaG)	Michael Hennessy (CnaG)	William Kent (FF)	Edmond Carey (CnaG)	Martin Corry (FF)
7th	1932	John Daly (CnaG)	William Broderick (CnaG)	Brook Brasier (Ind.)	Patrick Murphy (FF)	Martin Corry (FF)
8th	1933	Patrick Daly (CnaG)	William Broderick (CnaG)	William Kent (NCP)	Patrick Murphy (FF)	Martin Corry (FF)
9th	1937	Constituency abolished				

Dáil	Election	Deputy (Party)	Deputy (Party)	Deputy (Party)
13th	1948	Martin Corry (FF)	Patrick O'Gorman (FG)	Seán Keane (Lab)
14th	1951	Martin Corry (FF)	Patrick O'Gorman (FG)	Seán Keane (Lab)
14th	1953 by-election	Martin Corry (FF)	Patrick O'Gorman (FG)	Richard Barry (FG)
15th	1954	Martin Corry (FF)	John Moher (FF)	Richard Barry (FG)
16th	1957	Martin Corry (FF)	John Moher (FF)	Richard Barry (FG)
17th	1961	Constituency abolished		

Dáil	Election	Deputy (Party)	Deputy (Party)	Deputy (Party)	Deputy (Party)
22nd	1981	Carey Joyce (FF)	Myra Barry (FG)	Patrick Hegarty (FG)	Joe Sherlock (SF–WP)
23rd	1982 (Feb)	Michael Ahern (FF)	Myra Barry (FG)	Patrick Hegarty (FG)	Joe Sherlock (SF–WP)
24th	1982 (Nov)	Michael Ahern (FF)	Myra Barry (FG)	Patrick Hegarty (FG)	Ned O'Keeffe (FF)
25th	1987	Michael Ahern (FF)	Joe Sherlock (WP)	Patrick Hegarty (FG)	Ned O'Keeffe (FF)
26th	1989	Michael Ahern (FF)	Joe Sherlock (WP)	Paul Bradford (FG)	Ned O'Keeffe (FF)
27th	1992	Michael Ahern (FF)	John Mulvihill (Lab)	Paul Bradford (FG)	Ned O'Keeffe (FF)
28th	1997	Michael Ahern (FF)	David Stanton (FG)	Paul Bradford (FG)	Ned O'Keeffe (FF)
29th	2002	Michael Ahern (FF)	David Stanton (FG)	Joe Sherlock (Lab)	Ned O'Keeffe (FF)
30th	2007	Michael Ahern (FF)	David Stanton (FG)	Seán Sherlock (Lab)	Ned O'Keeffe (FF)
31st	2011	Sandra McLellan (SF)	David Stanton (FG)	Seán Sherlock (Lab)	Tom Barry (FG)
32nd	2016	Pat Buckley (SF)	David Stanton (FG)	Seán Sherlock (Lab)	Kevin O'Keeffe (FF)
33rd	2020	Pat Buckley (SF)	David Stanton (FG)	Seán Sherlock (Lab)	James O'Connor (FF)
34th	2024	Pat Buckley (SF)	Noel McCarthy (FG)	Liam Quaide (SD)	James O'Connor (FF)
