= Thomas Kent =

Irish nationalist (1865–1916)

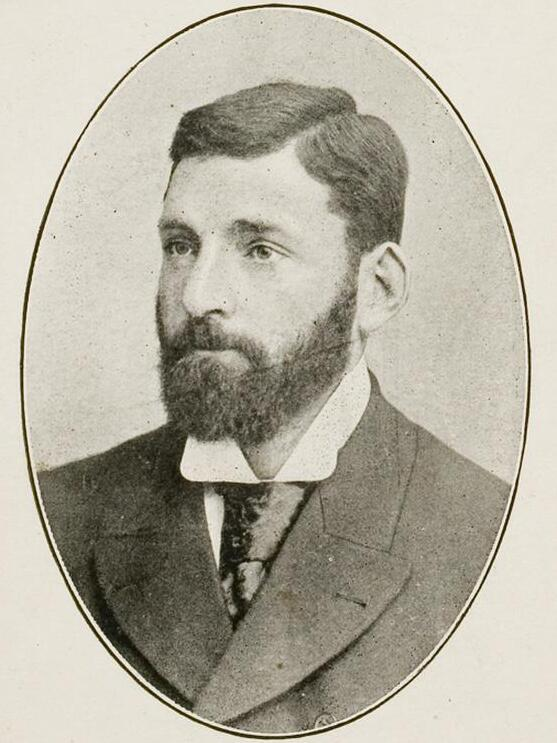
- Born: 29 August 1865; Castlelyons, County Cork, Ireland
- Died: 9 May 1916 (aged 50); Victoria Barracks, Cork, Ireland
- Cause of death: Execution by firing squad
- Relatives: David Kent (brother); William Kent (brother)
- Military career
- Allegiance: Irish Republic
- Branch: Irish Volunteers
- Service years: 1913–1916
- Units: Cork Brigade, Irish Volunteers
- Conflicts: Easter Rising
- Memorials: Cork Kent railway station

Thomas Kent (Irish: Tomás Ceannt; 29 August 1865 – 9 May 1916) was an Irish nationalist who was court-martialled and executed following a gunfight with the Royal Irish Constabulary (RIC) on 9 May 1916, in the immediate aftermath of the Easter Rising.

== Easter Rising ==
Kent was part of a prominent nationalist family who lived at Bawnard House, Castlelyons, County Cork. They were prepared to take part in the Easter Rising, but when the mobilisation order was countermanded, they stayed at home. The rising nevertheless went ahead in Dublin, and the RIC was sent to arrest well-known sympathizers throughout the country, including known members of the Irish Republican Brotherhood, Sinn Féin, and the Irish Volunteers. When the Kent residence was raided they were met with resistance from Thomas and his brothers Richard, David and William. A gunfight lasted for four hours, in which an RIC officer, Head Constable William Rowe, was killed and David Kent was seriously wounded. Eventually, the Kents were forced to surrender, although Richard made a last minute dash for freedom and was fatally wounded.

== Trial and execution ==
Thomas and William Kent were tried by court martial on the charge of armed rebellion. William was acquitted, but Thomas was sentenced to death. David Kent was brought to Dublin where he was charged with the same offence, found guilty and sentenced to death, but the sentence was commuted and he was sentenced to five years penal servitude. Thomas Kent was executed by firing squad in Cork on 9 May 1916, the only person outside of Dublin to be shot for his role in the events surrounding Easter Week (Roger Casement was hanged for treason in London). Kent was buried in the grounds of Cork Prison, formerly the Military Detention Barracks at the rear Collins Barracks, Cork (formerly Victoria Barracks). The former army married quarters to the rear of Collins Barracks are named in his honour.

== State funeral ==
Taoiseach Enda Kenny offered a state funeral to the Kent family early in 2015, which they accepted. Kent's remains were exhumed from Cork prison in June 2015 after being buried for 99 years. The analysis of Kent's remains, which had been found in a shallow, quicklime-filled grave, involved the State Pathologist's Office, the National Forensic Coordination Office at the Garda Technical Bureau, Forensic Science Ireland, and scientists from University College Dublin, and the scientific team was led by Dr. Jens Carlsson from the University of California-Davis. The State funeral was held on 18 September 2015 at St Nicholas' Church in Castlelyons. Kent lay in state at Collins Barracks in Cork the day before. The requiem mass was attended by President Michael D. Higgins, with Enda Kenny delivering the graveside oration.

== Memorials ==
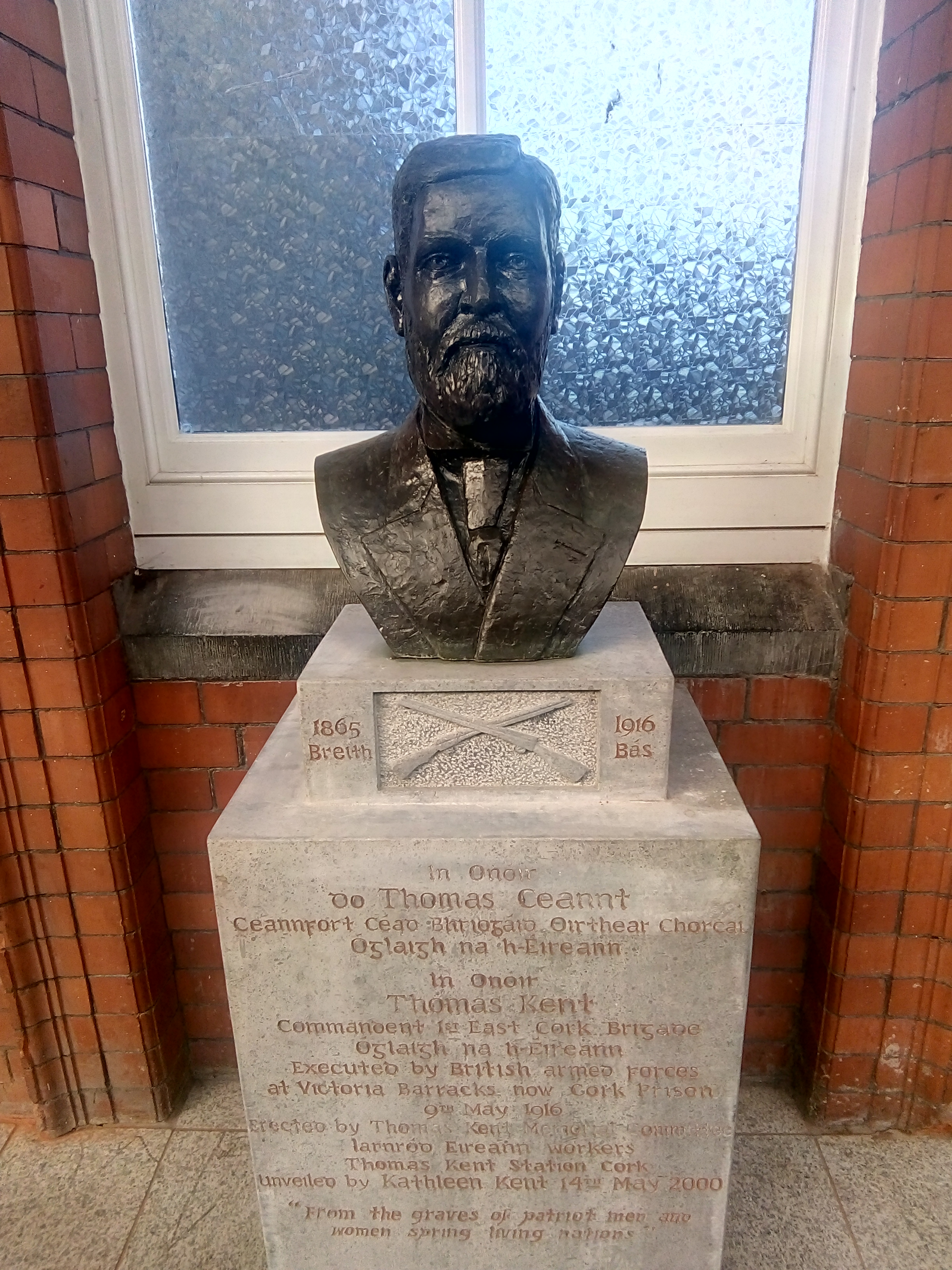
Bust of Kent at Cork Kent railway station by sculptor James MacCarthy

The main railway station in Cork, Kent Station was named after Thomas Kent in 1966.

The bridge over the River Blackwater in Fermoy, County Cork, where Thomas Kent was detained following his arrest, was named after him and his brothers in 2016.

== Bibliography ==
- Declan Kiberd editor, 1916 Rebellion Handbook Dublin: Mourne River Press, 1998. ISBN 1-902090-05-5
- Meda Ryan, Thomas Kent, Dublin: O'Brien Press, 2016. ISBN 1-847178-59-6
