= Collins Barracks, Cork =

Military barracks in Cork, Ireland

- Dún Uí Choileáin, Corcaigh
- Cork, Ireland
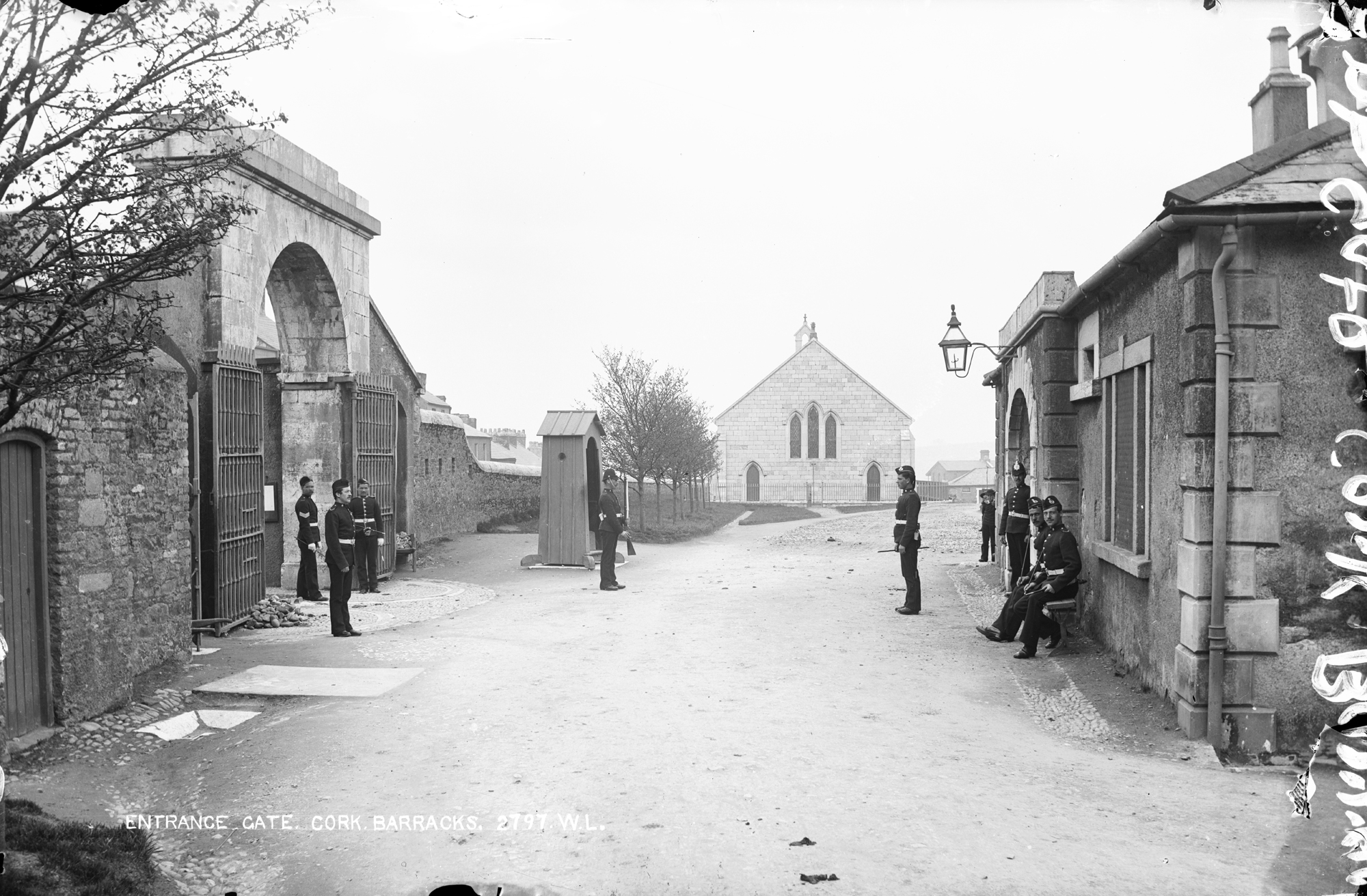
- Entrance gate and guardroom in the late 19th Century

Site information
- Type: Military barracks
- Operator: Irish Army
- Open to the public: Partial (Barracks museum is open to public at certain times)

Location
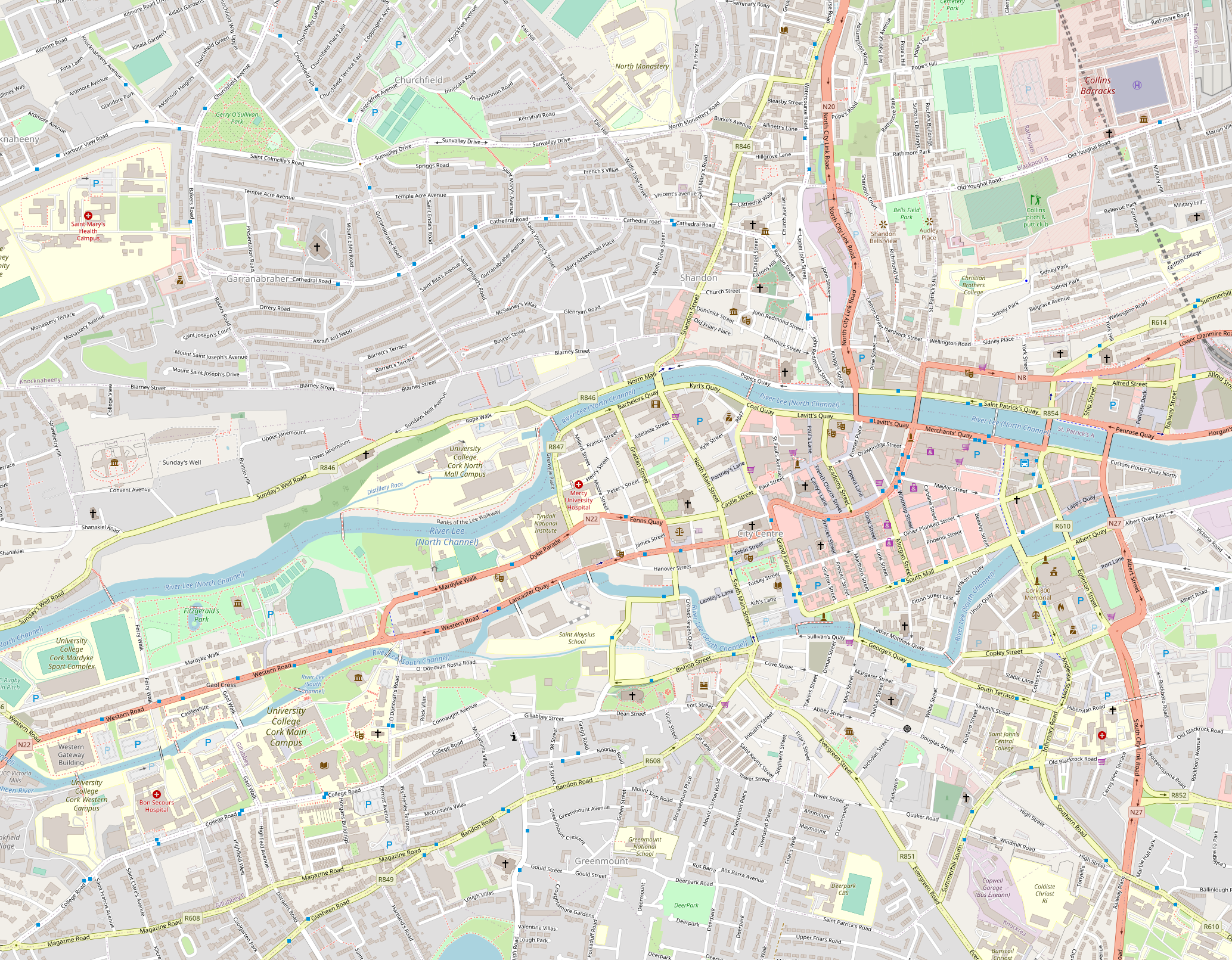
- Location within Cork Central
- Coordinates: 51.908°N 8.462°W

Site history
- Built: 1801

Garrison information
- Garrison: 1st Southern Brigade

Collins Barracks (Irish: Dún Uí Choileáin) is a military barracks on the Old Youghal Road on the north side of Cork in Ireland. Originally serving as a British military barracks from the early 19th century, it was known as Victoria Barracks by the late 19th century. It was handed-over to the Irish military following the Irish War of Independence, and remains the headquarters of the 1st Brigade of the Irish Army. A museum in the barracks is open to the public at selected times.

== History ==
=== Formation ===
Originally erected between 1801 and 1806, the barracks' works were completed by Abraham Hargrave to designs by John Gibson. Located in a prominent position on the hills overlooking Cork city and the River Lee, the complex was initially known simply as "The Barracks". It was extended in 1849 and renamed to "Victoria Barracks", to celebrate a visit by Queen Victoria.

=== Independence ===
In the period following the Easter Rising (1916), the Irish nationalist Thomas Kent was executed by firing squad at the barracks. He was the only person outside Dublin, apart from Roger Casement, to be executed for participation following the Rising.

During the Irish War of Independence (1919–1921), Auxiliary forces based at the barracks were implicated in events surrounding the Burning of Cork. British forces from the barracks were also involved in the executions of several Republican prisoners. On 1 February 1921 Cornelius Murphy was executed and then on 28 April 1921, four Volunteers, Maurice Moore, Thomas Mulcahy, Patrick O'Sullivan and Patrick Ronayne, were executed by firing squad at the barracks, followed by the execution of Patrick Casey a few days later, and of Daniel O'Brien on 16 May 1921.

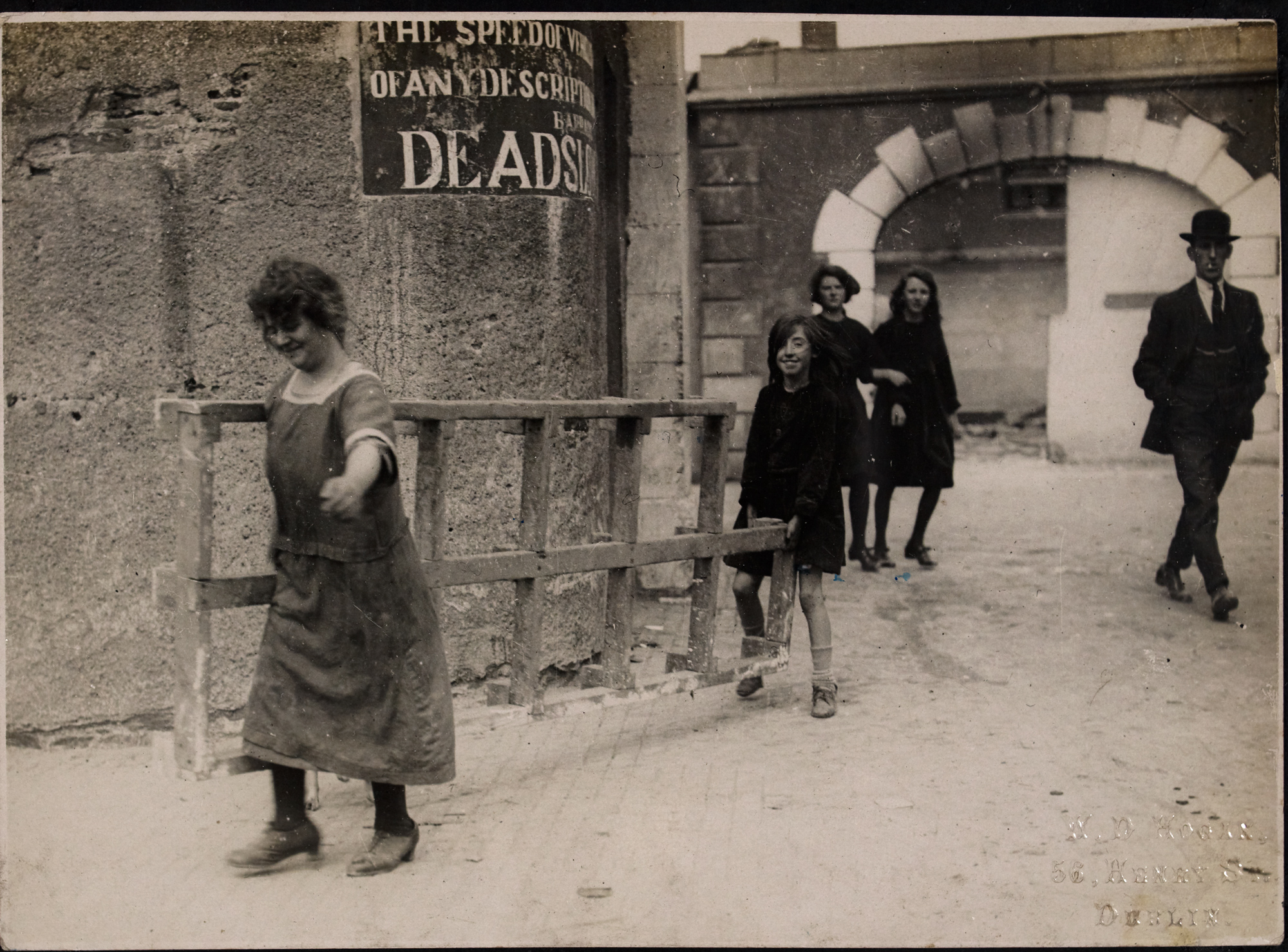
Removal of material following the burning of the barracks by retreating Anti-Treaty forces

Following the War of Independence, under the terms of the Anglo-Irish Treaty, and after housing British forces in the city for more than one hundred years, the barracks complex was handed over to Commandant Sean Murray of the army of the Irish Free State in 1922. Key buildings within the barracks were substantially damaged by retreating Anti-Treaty forces during the Irish Civil War. After this conflict, the barracks was renamed Collins Barracks for Michael Collins, the first commander-in-chief of the Free State, and a native of County Cork.

=== Late 20th century ===
A garrison for the Southern Command of the Irish Army since the 1920s, the complex was visited by US President John F. Kennedy in 1963.

The barracks now houses the headquarters of 1 Southern Brigade, with permanent and reserve elements of several army corps, including artillery, cavalry, communications, engineering and logistics units.

From 2003 the barracks was subject to a modernisation programme, with the building of new messing facilities, a gymnasium and other works.

== Museum ==
The Collins Barracks Military Museum is located inside the garrison. The museum contains various military exhibits, including a FV101 Scorpion light tank (number SI-5361).

== See also ==
- Cork Prison
- List of Irish military installations
