= Castlelyons =

Village in County Cork, Ireland

Castlelyons Caisleán Ó Liatháin
- Village
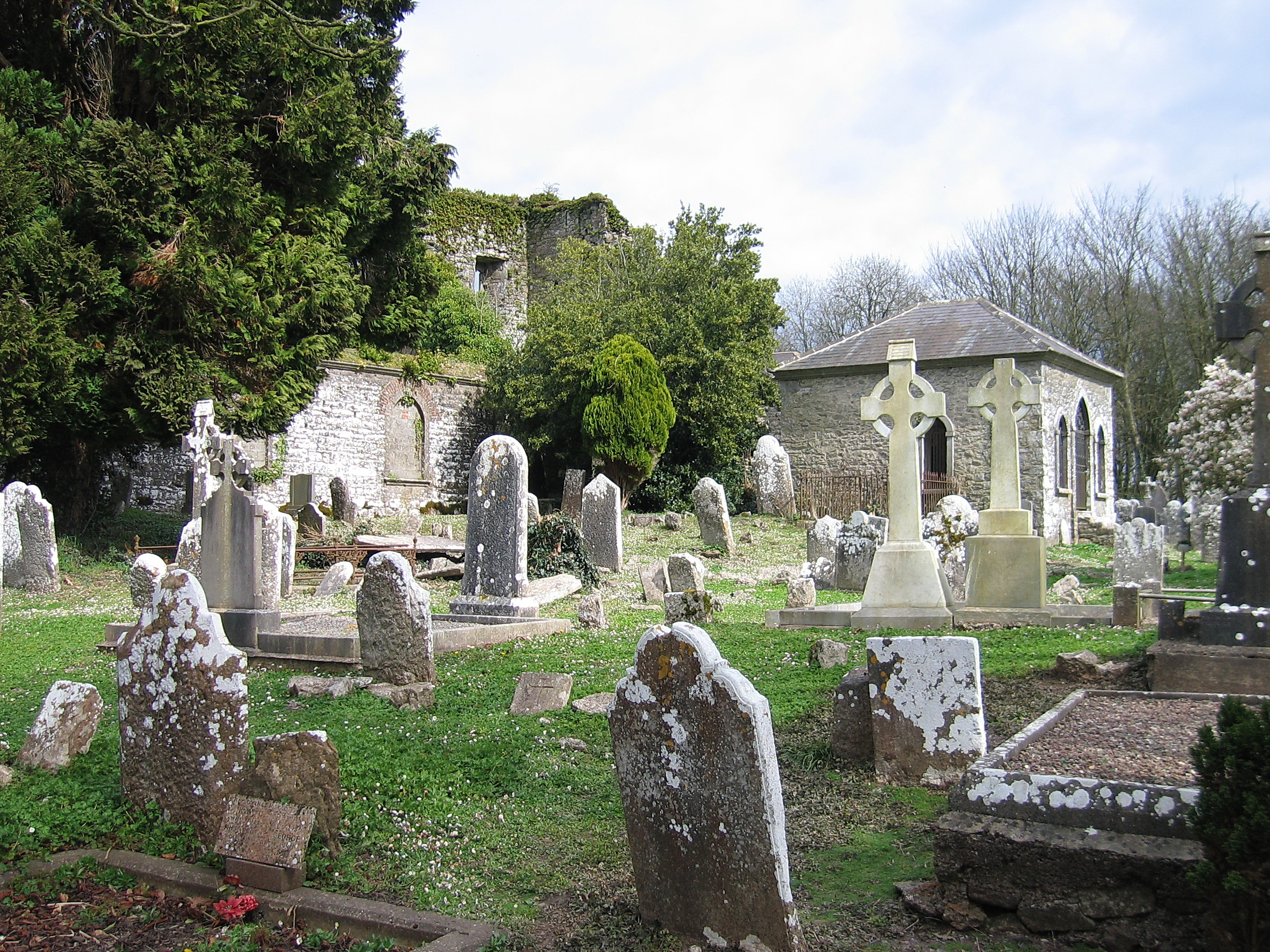
- St Nicholas's Cemetery, Kill-Saint-Anne, Castlelyons

- Location in Ireland
- Coordinates: 52.089°N 8.234°W
- Country: Ireland
- Province: Munster
- County: County Cork

Population (2022)
  - Total: 428
- Time zone: UTC+0 (WET)
  - Summer (DST): UTC-1 (IST (WEST))

Castlelyons (Irish: Caisleán Ó Liatháin) is a small village in the east of County Cork, Ireland. It is also a civil parish in the barony of Barrymore. The name is derived from a stronghold of the Uí Liatháin - an early medieval kingdom. It is situated 6 km (3.7 mi) south of Fermoy. In the 2022 census the village recorded a population of 428. Castlelyons is part of the Dáil constituency of Cork East.

There are two stone bridges that cross the River Bride into the village - one a small footbridge and the other a bridge which was part of the entrance into Barrymore Castle - the seat of the Earls of Barrymore. The parish has two churches at Bridesbridge and Coolagown, and also has a castle, two abbeys, a mausoleum, two holy wells, and many other historical sites.

== History ==
The Catholic parish of Castlelyons today is made up of three main districts - Coolagown, Britway and Castlelyons/Bridesbridge. Three quarters of the parish extend along the banks of the River Bride.

Castlelyons Friary existed between the 14th and 18th centuries.

During the English Civil War, the Battle of Castlelyons in 1645 was fought near the village.

== Sport ==
Hunting, shooting and fishing are popular in the area and there is both a gun club and an angling club. The also village has a pitch and putt course.

The village has squash courts and a Gaelic Athletic Association (GAA) pitch. Castlelyons GAA is the local GAA club.

== People ==
- Thomas Kent, an Irish nationalist court-martialled and executed following a gunfight with the Royal Irish Constabulary (RIC) on 2 May 1916, in the immediate aftermath of the Easter Rising.
- William Brouncker, 2nd Viscount Brouncker, the celebrated mathematician, born here in 1620.

== See also ==
- Nance the Piper
- Lyons (disambiguation)
- Lehane
- Castlemartyr
- List of towns and villages in Ireland
