= Crowley (surname) =

Family name

Crowley is an English and Irish surname, which was traditionally pronounced /ˈkroʊli/ in English but is now often pronounced /ˈkraʊli/. In England, it is a habitational surname, meaning referring to someone who lived in or nearby a meadow of crows.

In Ireland, the name was first found in Moylurg, in County Roscommon, where it started as a branch of the MacDermots. It is from Teige, a Prince of Moylurg, down to Cruadhlaoch that the line of descent for the Crowleys begins. A junior branch of the Crowley family also emerged and moved to the area of Dunmanway, in the west of County Cork. They eventually became a distinct sept with their chief at Kilshallow, thriving while their family of origin gradually decreased in number. The majority of the Crowley family came from the county of Cork, with three-quarters of the family originating from there.

The Irish O Cruadhlaoich or Ua Cruadhlaoich, a Gaelic name meaning "descendant of the hard hero" or "descendant of the hardy warrior", was anglicised to "Crowley" or "O'Crowley".

== People with the surname ==
- Aleister Crowley (1875–1947), English occultist
- Ambrose Crowley (1658–1713), English industrialist of the late 17th and early 18th centuries
- Amelia Crowley (fl. 1995–), Irish actress
- Ann Crowley (singer) (1929–2023), American singer and actress
- Anthony Crowley, Australian playwright
- Audrey Pascual (born 2004), Spanish para-alpine skier
- Benjamin Crowley, namesake of Crowley's Ridge in Arkansas (c. 1758–1842)
- Bill Crowley (baseball) (1857–1891), American baseball player
- Bob Crowley (born 1952), Irish theatre director
- Brian Crowley (1964–2026), Irish politician
- Brian Lee Crowley (born 1955), Canadian political economist, author, and public policy commentator
- Candy Crowley (born 1948), American news anchor, political correspondent for the CNN television network
- Carrie Crowley (born 1964), Irish actress
- Cheree Crowley (born 1988), New Zealander professional wrestler, better known as Dakota Kai
- Clive Crowley (1890–1918), Australian grazier and soldier
- Daniel Crowley (disambiguation), several people
- Darren Crowley (born 1987), Irish hurler
- David Crowley (Wisconsin politician) (born 1986), Wisconsin governor-elect
- Dennis Crowley (born 1976), American internet entrepreneur
- Dermot Crowley (born 1947), Irish actor
- Elizabeth Crowley (born 1977), American politician
- Elizabeth Crowley (Rhode Island politician) (born 1951), American politician
- Evin Crowley (born 1945), Northern Irish actress
- Flor Crowley (1934–1977), Teachta Dála from West Cork
- Francis Crowley (1912–1932), American murderer and career criminal
- Frank Crowley (athlete) (1909–1980), American middle- and long-distance runner
- Frank Crowley (politician) (1939–2022), Teachta Dála from Cork North West
- Frederick Crowley (1890–1945), Teachta Dála for Kerry South
- Gary Crowley (born 1961), British broadcaster, TV presenter and DJ
- Grace Crowley (1890–1979), Australian artist
- Herbert Crowley (1873–1937), British painter and cartoonist
- Honor Crowley (1903–1966), Teachta Dála for Kerry South
- J.C. Crowley (born 1947), American musician
- Jack Crowley, Irish rugby union international player
- James Crowley (athlete), Irish American Athletic Club distance runner
- James Crowley, police officer in Cambridge, Massachusetts
- James Crowley (politician) (1880–1946), Irish nationalist politician
- Jeananne Crowley (born 1949), Irish-born actress and writer
- Jeremiah Crowley (politician) (1832–1901), in Massachusetts
- Jeremiah J. Crowley (1861–1927), American religious leader and writer
- Jim Crowley (1902–1986), American college football player
- Jimmy Crowley, Irish folk musician
- Joe Crowley (television presenter), British television presenter
- Joe Crowley (born 1962), American politician
- Joseph Robert Crowley (1915–2003), American Catholic bishop
- John Francis Crowley (1891–1942), Irish revolutionary and longest hunger striker in history
- John Crowley (disambiguation), several people
- John W. Crowley (1899–1974), American aerospace engineer
- Johnny Crowley (born 1956), Irish hurling player
- Johnny Crowley (Gaelic footballer), Irish footballer
- Joseph Crowley (disambiguation), several people
- Kacy Crowley, American musician
- Kathleen Crowley (1929–2017), Miss America contestant and actress
- Kieran Crowley (born 1961), New Zealand Rugby player
- Leo Crowley (1889–1972), cabinet member of American President Franklin D. Roosevelt
- Margaret Crowley (speed skater) (born 1986), American speed skater
- Margaret Crowley (athlete) (born 1967), Australian runner
- Mart Crowley (1935–2020), American playwright
- Mary Catherine Crowley (1856–1920; pen name, "Janet Grant"), American writer
- Matthias F. Cowley (1858–1940), American apostle of the LDS Church
- Michael Crowley (disambiguation), several people
- Mike Crowley (born 1975), American ice hockey player
- Miles Crowley (1859–1921), member of the US Congress (1879–1883) from Texas
- Monica Crowley (born 1968), American radio commentator
- Nathan Crowley, British film production designer
- Noel Crowley (hurler, born 1962), Irish hurler for Roanmore and Waterford
- Noel Crowley (dual player) (born 1951), Irish hurler, Gaelic footballer and coach for Cork teams
- Pádraig Crowley (born 1957), Irish hurling player
- Pat Crowley (1933–2025), American actress
- Pat Crowley (fashion designer) (1933–2013), Irish fashion designer
- Pat Crowley (rugby union) (1923–1981), New Zealander rugby union player
- Paul Crowley (footballer) (born 1980), Irish footballer
- Paul F. Crowley (born 1934), Pennsylvania House of Representatives member
- Peter William Crowley (1900–1963), Irish revolutionary and longest hunger striker in history
- Philip Crowley (disambiguation), several people
- Richard Crowley (1836–1908), member of the US Congress (1895–1897) from New York
- Robert Crowley (disambiguation), several people
- Rodney R. Crowley (1836–1913), New York lawyer and politician
- Roger Crowley (born 1951), British author
- Rosemary Crowley (1938–2025), Labor Senator for South Australia and medical doctor
- Ryan Crowley (born 1984), Australian footballer
- Stephen Crowley (cricketer) (born 1961), English cricketer
- Steve Crowley, American Marine killed during the siege of the U.S. Embassy in Pakistan
- Tadhg Crowley (1890–1969), Irish politician from Limerick
- Tadhgo Crowley (1921–1963), Gaelic football player
- Ted Crowley (born 1970), American ice hockey player
- Terry Crowley (born 1947), American baseball coach
- Terry Crowley (linguist) (1953–2005), British-Australian linguist specializing in Oceanic languages
- Thomas Crowley (disambiguation), several people
- Timothy Crowley (1847–1921), Irish revolutionary
- Tim Crowley (born 1952), Irish sportsperson
- Walt Crowley (1947–2007), Washington State community leader
- Irene Craigmile Bolam née O'Crowley (1904–1982), falsely accused of being Amelia Earhart

== Fictional characters ==
- Father Crowley, catholic priest in TV comedy-drama Desperate Housewives
- Terry Crowley (The Shield), in TV drama The Shield
- Victor Crowley, in 2006 film Hatchet
- Crowley, in TV drama series Supernatural
- Crowley, in TV drama series The Walking Dead

== See also ==
- Crowley (disambiguation)
- Crawley (surname)
