= Irish hunger strike =

Irish hunger strike can refer to

- 1920 Cork hunger strike, including mayor of Cork Terence MacSwiney
- 1923 Irish hunger strikes, several thousand Irish republican prisoners
- 1972 Irish hunger strike
- 1980 Irish hunger strike – predecessor of the bigger and better known 1981 strike
- 1981 Irish hunger strike
