= John Crowley =

John Crowley may refer to:

- John Crowley (author) (1942–2026), American author
- John Crowley (baseball) (1862–1896), American Major League catcher
- John Crowley (businessman) (born 1967), American biotechnology executive
- John Crowley (bishop) (born 1941), former bishop of Middlesbrough
- John Crowley (director) (born 1969), Irish theatre and film director
- John Crowley (politician) (1870–1934), Irish Sinn Féin politician
- John Crowley (1659–1728), British politician
- John Francis Crowley (1891–1942), Irish revolutionary and hunger striker
- John Powers Crowley (1936–1989), U.S. federal judge
- Johnny Crowley (born 1956), Irish hurler
- Johnny Crowley (Gaelic footballer), Gaelic footballer with Kerry GAA
- John J. Crowley (1891–1940), American Catholic priest
- John W. Crowley (1899–1974), American pilot and NASA director
