= Peter Crowley =

Peter Crowley may refer to:

- Peter Crowley (Gaelic footballer) (born 1990)
- Peter Crowley (revolutionary) (1900–1963), participated in the longest hunger strike in history
