= Tadhg Crowley =

Irish politician (1890–1969)

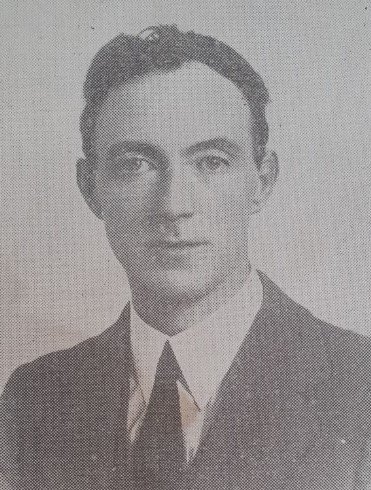
- Crowley in 1924

Teachta Dála
- In office May 1951 – March 1957
- Constituency: Limerick East
- In office June 1938 – May 1944
- In office June 1927 – July 1937
- Constituency: Limerick

Senator
- In office 22 May 1957 – 14 December 1961
- In office 18 August 1944 – 21 April 1948
- Constituency: Industrial and Commercial Panel

Personal details
- Born: 1 May 1890 Ballylanders, County Limerick, Ireland
- Died: 25 July 1969 (aged 79) Scarteen, County Limerick, Ireland
- Party: Fianna Fáil
- Parent: Timothy Crowley (father)
- Relatives: Peter Crowley (brother)

Tadhg Crowley (1 May 1890 – 25 July 1969) was an Irish revolutionary and Fianna Fáil politician. He was first elected to Dáil Éireann as a Teachta Dála (TD) for the Limerick constituency at the June 1927 general election.

== Early life ==
Born on 1 May 1890, in Ballylanders, County Limerick, Tadhg Crowley was the second eldest of eight sons and one sister. Timothy Crowley, his father, was the village postmaster and the proprietor of Crowley's Drapery, as well as the former secretary of the Hospital branch of the Irish Republican Brotherhood, while his mother was Ellen Ryan of Killeen. Crowley was educated at Rockwell College, County Tipperary.

== Early revolutionary activities ==
When the Ballylanders branch of the Irish Volunteers were set up in 1913, Tadhg Crowley stepped in and took charge. At the split of the Volunteers at the outbreak of the First World War, most of the Ballylanders company took the Redmondite side, however Crowley, along with a strong minority, chose to follow Eoin MacNeill. After a parade of the area's Volunteer Companies in Elton in 1914, Crowley and the men from Ballylanders placed first and were awarded with a cup.

Crowley was subsequently inducted into the Irish Republican Brotherhood (IRB) in 1915 by Ernest Blythe, with his many brothers soon to follow, and later that same year attended the funeral of Jeremiah O'Donovan Rossa at Glasnevin Cemetery.

== War of Independence ==
Kilmallock's postmaster came to Crowley's Drapery in early 1916 with an order from the government for the family to sever their revolutionary connections. To this, Tadhg's father, Timothy Crowley, gave no definite reply, and he contacted Eoin MacNeill about the matter. Upon careful consideration, Crowley resigned as captain of the Ballylanders Company, with his brothers following suit. However, they continued to act as auxiliaries in the organisation. At this time, Crowley was also operating as the head Centre of the IRB in the Ballylanders district, a group which included about 22 men.

Crowley followed MacNeill's orders not to take part in the Easter Rising, and a few months later, his father was removed from the position of postmaster, thereafter allowing the Crowleys to take in active part in the Volunteer movement once again. In 1920 during the Irish War of Independence, and with plans to attack the Ballylanders Royal Irish Constabulary barracks, Crowley informed his father that the drapery was to be used for purpose of the attack, which he of course made no objection to, having been a Fenian himself, and soldiers fired from Crowley's Drapery during the attack.

In July 1920, the drapery was attacked by the British, and soon after they came back to arrest Tadhg's brothers Peter, John and Michael, the former two of whom would be part of the 94-day hunger strike in Cork Gaol, the longest without any food in history. On 25 July Crowley's Drapery was set on fire, and soon after blown up, causing damages worth £22,500. With three of their brothers in prison, Tadhg, along with Joseph and James Crowley, went on the run. He was later arrested, and sentenced to 15 years' penal servitude, a sentence which he did not end up fully serving after the Anglo-Irish Treaty came into effect.

== Civil War ==
Taking the anti-Treaty side in the Irish Civil War, Crowley served as Battalion Commandant of Abbeyfeale Battalion, West Limerick Brigade Anti-Treaty IRA and took part in operations against National forces. He was arrested in October 1922 and interned in Limerick Prison until April 1923.

Crowley was later awarded a pension by the Irish government under the Military Service Pensions Act, 1934 for his service with the IRA between 1917 and 1923.

== Political career ==
Crowley contested the 1924 Limerick by-election as a Republican candidate, losing with 45.7% to Richard O'Connell. During the campaign, meetings across the county in support of him were addressed by a wide range of Anti-Treaty leaders, including Mary MacSwiney, her sister, Annie MacSwiney, Caitlín Brugha, Kathleen Lynn, Gobnait Ní Bhruadair, Constance Markievicz, Dan Breen, Michael Comyn, Art O'Connor, and Mrs. O'Malley, the mother of Ernie O'Malley.

He was elected to the 5th Dáil as a Fianna Fáil candidate for the Limerick constituency at the June 1927 general election. He was re-elected at each subsequent general election until he lost his seat at the 1937 general election. He regained his seat at the 1938 general election and held it at the 1943 general election, but lost his seat again at the 1944 general election. Crowley was elected to the 5th Seanad in 1944 by the Industrial and Commercial Panel. He was defeated at the 1948 Seanad election. He was once more elected to the Dáil at the 1951 general election and was re-elected at the 1954 general election. Crowley did not contest the 1957 general election but did contest the 1957 Seanad election, and was elected to the 9th Seanad on the Industrial and Commercial Panel. He did not contest the 1961 Seanad election.

== Later life ==
Following his retirement from politics, Tadhg lived for a time in Ballylanders, before moving in with his sister, Bridget O'Donnell, at her home in Scarteen.

== Death ==
Tadhg Crowley died on 25 July 1969, in his sister's home in Scarteen, aged 79. He was buried in Ladywell Cemetery, Ballylanders, in the Republican plot, along with his brothers Joseph and Michael.

Dáil	Election	Deputy (Party)	Deputy (Party)	Deputy (Party)	Deputy (Party)	Deputy (Party)	Deputy (Party)	Deputy (Party)
4th	1923	Richard Hayes (CnaG)	James Ledden (CnaG)	Seán Carroll (Rep)	James Colbert (Rep)	John Nolan (CnaG)	Patrick Clancy (Lab)	Patrick Hogan (FP)
4th	1924 by-election	Richard O'Connell (CnaG)	James Ledden (CnaG)	Seán Carroll (Rep)	James Colbert (Rep)	John Nolan (CnaG)	Patrick Clancy (Lab)	Patrick Hogan (FP)
5th	1927 (Jun)	Richard O'Connell (CnaG)	Gilbert Hewson (Ind.)	Tadhg Crowley (FF)	James Colbert (FF)	George C. Bennett (CnaG)	Patrick Clancy (Lab)	Michael Keyes (Lab)
6th	1927 (Sep)	Richard O'Connell (CnaG)	Daniel Bourke (FF)	Tadhg Crowley (FF)	James Colbert (FF)	George C. Bennett (CnaG)	Patrick Clancy (Lab)	John Nolan (CnaG)
7th	1932	James Reidy (CnaG)	Daniel Bourke (FF)	Tadhg Crowley (FF)	James Colbert (FF)	George C. Bennett (CnaG)	Robert Ryan (FF)	John O'Shaughnessy (FP)
8th	1933	James Reidy (CnaG)	Daniel Bourke (FF)	Tadhg Crowley (FF)	Donnchadh Ó Briain (FF)	George C. Bennett (CnaG)	Robert Ryan (FF)	Michael Keyes (Lab)
9th	1937	John O'Shaughnessy (FG)	Daniel Bourke (FF)	Michael Colbert (FF)	Donnchadh Ó Briain (FF)	George C. Bennett (FG)	Robert Ryan (FF)	Michael Keyes (Lab)
10th	1938	James Reidy (FG)	Daniel Bourke (FF)	Tadhg Crowley (FF)	Donnchadh Ó Briain (FF)	George C. Bennett (FG)	Robert Ryan (FF)	Michael Keyes (Lab)
11th	1943	James Reidy (FG)	Daniel Bourke (FF)	Tadhg Crowley (FF)	Donnchadh Ó Briain (FF)	George C. Bennett (FG)	Robert Ryan (FF)	Michael Keyes (Lab)
12th	1944	James Reidy (FG)	Daniel Bourke (FF)	Michael Colbert (FF)	Donnchadh Ó Briain (FF)	George C. Bennett (FG)	Robert Ryan (FF)	Michael Keyes (Lab)
13th	1948	Constituency abolished. See Limerick East and Limerick West						

Dáil	Election	Deputy (Party)	Deputy (Party)	Deputy (Party)
31st	2011	Niall Collins (FF)	Dan Neville (FG)	Patrick O'Donovan (FG)
32nd	2016	Constituency abolished. See Limerick County		

Dáil	Election	Deputy (Party)	Deputy (Party)	Deputy (Party)	Deputy (Party)	Deputy (Party)
13th	1948	Michael Keyes (Lab)	Robert Ryan (FF)	James Reidy (FG)	Daniel Bourke (FF)	4 seats 1948–1981
14th	1951	Michael Keyes (Lab)	Tadhg Crowley (FF)	James Reidy (FG)	Daniel Bourke (FF)	4 seats 1948–1981
14th	1952 by-election	Michael Keyes (Lab)	Tadhg Crowley (FF)	James Reidy (FG)	John Carew (FG)	4 seats 1948–1981
15th	1954	Michael Keyes (Lab)	Tadhg Crowley (FF)	Donogh O'Malley (FF)	John Carew (FG)	4 seats 1948–1981
16th	1957	Ted Russell (Ind.)	Paddy Clohessy (FF)	Donogh O'Malley (FF)	John Carew (FG)	4 seats 1948–1981
17th	1961	Stephen Coughlan (Lab)	Paddy Clohessy (FF)	Donogh O'Malley (FF)	Tom O'Donnell (FG)	4 seats 1948–1981
18th	1965	Stephen Coughlan (Lab)	Paddy Clohessy (FF)	Donogh O'Malley (FF)	Tom O'Donnell (FG)	4 seats 1948–1981
18th	1968 by-election	Stephen Coughlan (Lab)	Paddy Clohessy (FF)	Desmond O'Malley (FF)	Tom O'Donnell (FG)	4 seats 1948–1981
19th	1969	Stephen Coughlan (Lab)	Michael Herbert (FF)	Desmond O'Malley (FF)	Tom O'Donnell (FG)	4 seats 1948–1981
20th	1973	Stephen Coughlan (Lab)	Michael Herbert (FF)	Desmond O'Malley (FF)	Tom O'Donnell (FG)	4 seats 1948–1981
21st	1977	Michael Lipper (Ind.)	Michael Herbert (FF)	Desmond O'Malley (FF)	Tom O'Donnell (FG)	4 seats 1948–1981
22nd	1981	Jim Kemmy (Ind.)	Peadar Clohessy (FF)	Desmond O'Malley (FF)	Tom O'Donnell (FG)	Michael Noonan (FG)
23rd	1982 (Feb)	Jim Kemmy (DSP)	Willie O'Dea (FF)	Desmond O'Malley (FF)	Tom O'Donnell (FG)	Michael Noonan (FG)
24th	1982 (Nov)	Frank Prendergast (Lab)	Willie O'Dea (FF)	Desmond O'Malley (FF)	Tom O'Donnell (FG)	Michael Noonan (FG)
25th	1987	Jim Kemmy (DSP)	Willie O'Dea (FF)	Desmond O'Malley (PDs)	Peadar Clohessy (PDs)	Michael Noonan (FG)
26th	1989	Jim Kemmy (DSP)	Willie O'Dea (FF)	Desmond O'Malley (PDs)	Peadar Clohessy (PDs)	Michael Noonan (FG)
27th	1992	Jim Kemmy (Lab)	Willie O'Dea (FF)	Desmond O'Malley (PDs)	Peadar Clohessy (PDs)	Michael Noonan (FG)
28th	1997	Jim Kemmy (Lab)	Willie O'Dea (FF)	Desmond O'Malley (PDs)	Eddie Wade (FF)	Michael Noonan (FG)
28th	1998 by-election	Jan O'Sullivan (Lab)	Willie O'Dea (FF)	Desmond O'Malley (PDs)	Eddie Wade (FF)	Michael Noonan (FG)
29th	2002	Jan O'Sullivan (Lab)	Willie O'Dea (FF)	Tim O'Malley (PDs)	Peter Power (FF)	Michael Noonan (FG)
30th	2007	Jan O'Sullivan (Lab)	Willie O'Dea (FF)	Kieran O'Donnell (FG)	Peter Power (FF)	Michael Noonan (FG)
31st	2011	Constituency abolished. See Limerick City and Limerick				
