= Thomas Carroll (pilot) =

American test pilot (1890–1975)

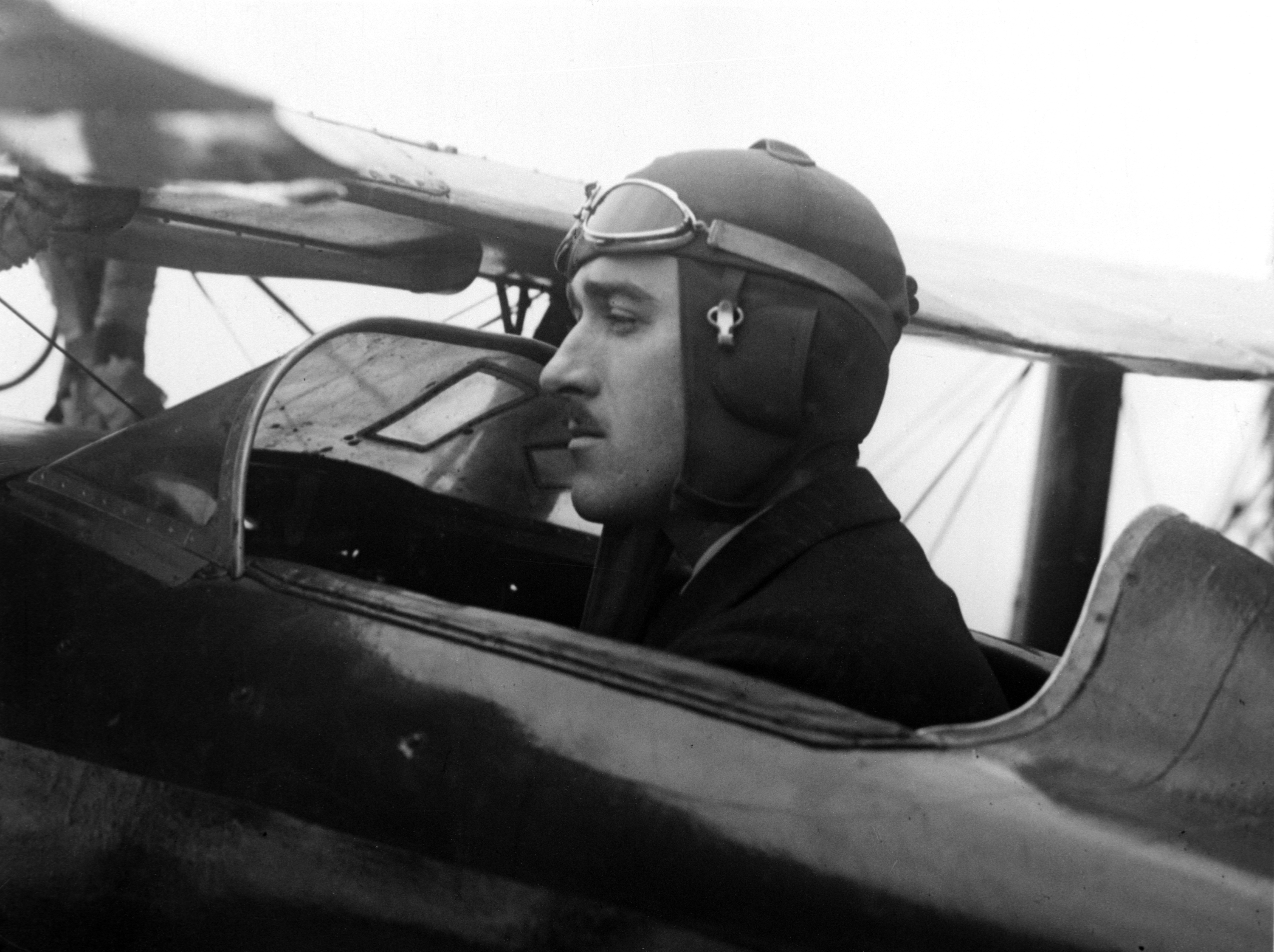
- Carroll in 1923
- Born: 1890
- Died: 1975 (age 84-85)
- Scientific career
- Education: Georgetown University (JD)
- Known for: Aircraft engine cowling NACA cowling
- Fields: Aeronautics
- Workplaces: NACA

Thomas A. Carroll (1890 – 1975) was an early American aeronautical engineer and the first civilian test pilot at the National Advisory Committee for Aeronautics (NACA), precursor to NASA. He helped develop the engine cowling as chief test pilot in 1929.

== Biography ==
Carroll was born in 1890. He was a first lieutenant in the 99th Aero Squadron, where he served in World War I as an American fighter pilot on the Western Front. He also taught air tactics as a pilot instructor in the military. After the war, Carroll attained a law degree from Georgetown University.

In 1922, Carroll joined the Langley Memorial Aeronautics Laboratory as the first civilian test pilot. He performed multiple test flights with John W. Crowley, the first civilian research pilot at NACA. They used the Curtiss JN-4 "Jenny" biplane as part of the earliest "instrumented tests of control and stability" to help develop tools to "measure and record the forces acting on aircraft". He also studied aircraft icing and wrote some of the earliest scientific studies of the phenomenon and its effects on flight stability.

He became chief test pilot at NACA Langley. There, Carroll helped develop a low-drag engine cowling using wind tunnel testing and an U.S. Army-donated Curtiss P-1 Hawk with a Whirlwind J-5 engine for advanced training purposes, dubbed the AT-5A. The cowling allowed Frank Hawks to set a nonstop speed record from Los Angeles to New York in a Lockheed Air Express in February of 1929. Jerry Vultee, chief engineer at Lockheed Aircraft Company, sent Carroll a telegram crediting NACA with its success.

== Gallery ==
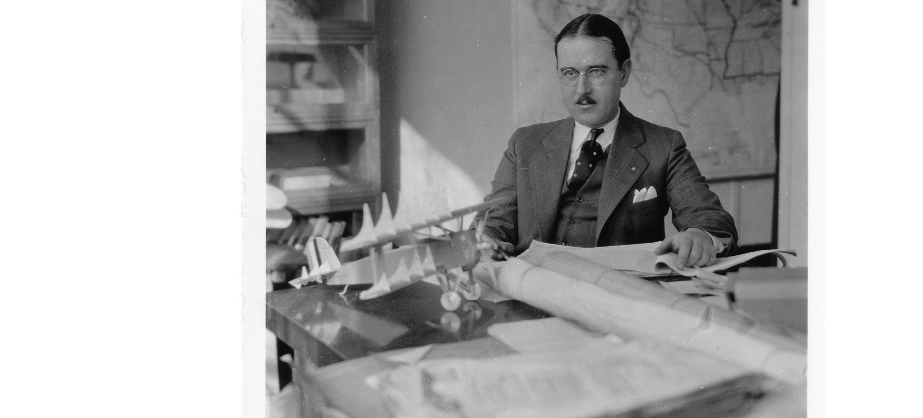
Thomas Carroll at his desk with models of biplane aircraft

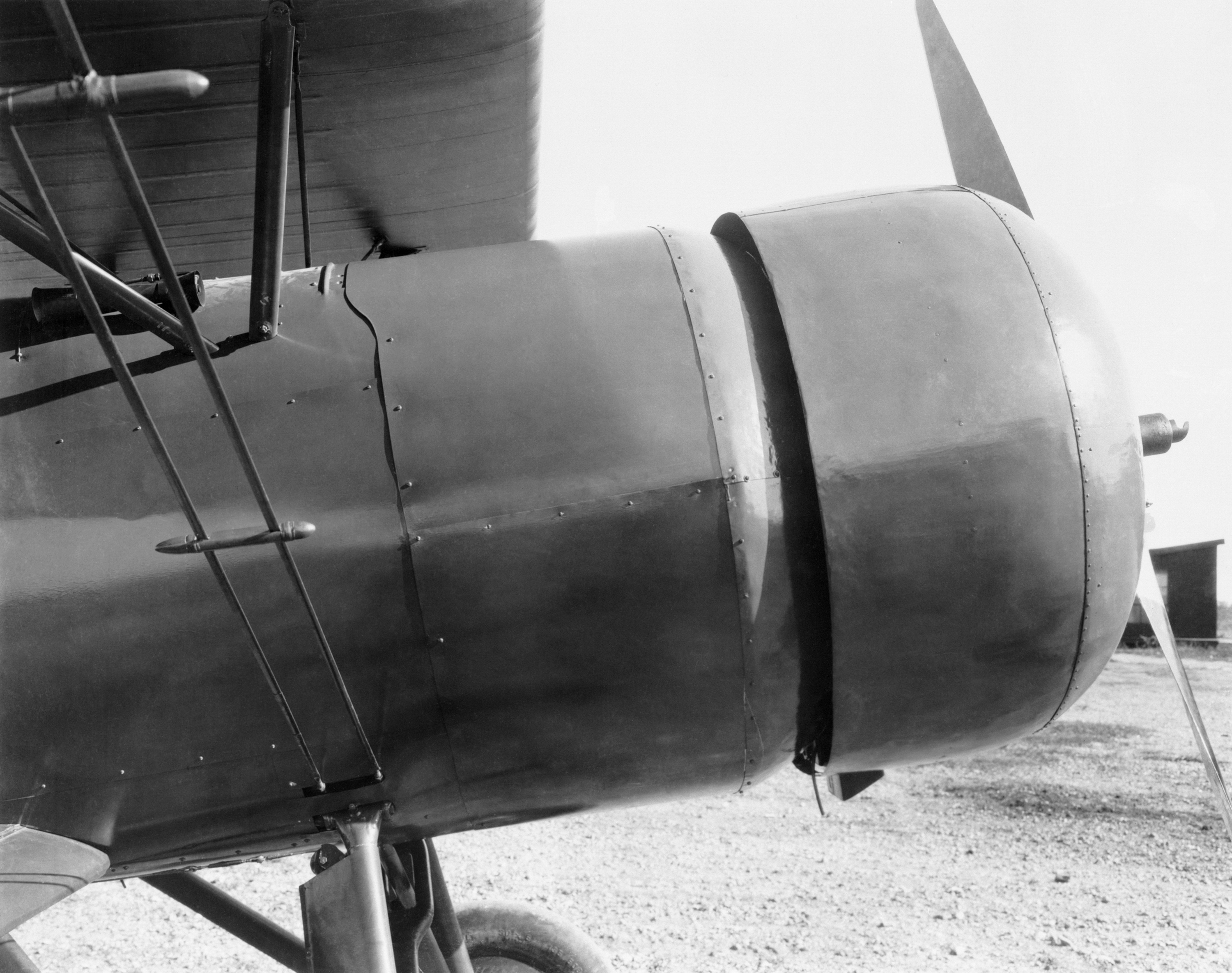
The NACA engine cowling on a Curtiss AT-5a
