= Michael Crowley =

Michael Crowley may refer to:

- Michael Crowley (soldier) (1829–1888), American Civil War soldier and Medal of Honor recipient
- Michael Crowley (baseball), president of the Oakland Athletics
- Michael Crowley (journalist) (born 1972), senior correspondent and deputy Washington bureau chief for Time magazine
- Mike Crowley (born 1975), retired American ice hockey player

== See also ==
- Michael Crawley (disambiguation)
