= Robert Crowley =

Robert Crowley may refer to:

- Robert Crowley (printer) (c. 1517–1588), English Protestant printer, editor, chronicler, social critic, poet, polemicist, and clergyman
- Robert Crowley (CIA) (1924–2000), assistant deputy director of clandestine operations for the CIA
- Bob Crowley (born 1952), theatre director
- Bob Crowley (Survivor contestant) (born 1951), winner of Survivor: Gabon
- Bob D. Crowley, American software executive and investor
- R. T. Crowley (born 1948), pioneer in electronic commerce
- Robert Crowley (bobsleigh) (born 1942), American bobsledder
