= Michael Crawley =

Michael Crawley may refer to:

- Mick Crawley (born 1949), British ecologist
- Mike Crawley, Canadian businessman and politician

== See also ==
- Michael Crowley (disambiguation)
