= Timothy Crowley =

Irish republican (1847–1921)

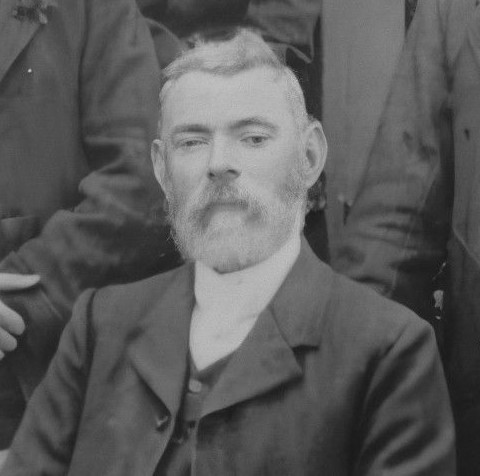
- Crowley in 1910
- Born: 31 July 1847; Elton, County Limerick, Ireland
- Died: 19 October 1921 (aged 74); Glin, County Limerick, Ireland
- Spouse: Ellen Ryan (m. 1887)
- Children: 9, including Tadhg and Peter
- Relatives: Peter O'Neill Crowley, Edmond Heelan

Signature
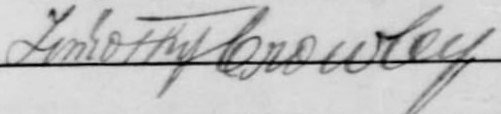

Timothy Crowley (31 July 1847 – 19 October 1921) was an Irish revolutionary who was a member of the Irish Republican Brotherhood (IRB). He was involved in the Fenian Rising of 1867, and was the secretary of the IRB in Hospital, County Limerick. He was the patriarch of the prominent Irish republican Crowley family of Ballylanders, and the father of the longest hunger strikers in history, John Crowley and Peter Crowley, and the Fianna Fáil politician Tadhg Crowley.

== Early life ==
Timothy Crowley was born in late July, 1847, in the small village of Elton, County Limerick. He was the eldest son and second child of James Crowley and Bridget Dwyer, and was baptised on 31 July 1847 in the parish of Knockainey, with Thomas and Bridget Dwyer as his sponsors. His father was a herdsman employed by George Gubbins, Esquire, who allowed the Crowleys to live on a small one-acre holding in a small, thatched cottage. Elton's population was reduced by over 100 people during the Great Famine, with Timothy having been born in its worst year, known as "Black '47". Two of his younger sisters, Mary and Margaret, were among the dead.

== Fenian activities ==
In the mid-1860s, while still a teenager, Crowley joined the Irish Republican Brotherhood. In 1867, he fought in the Fenian Rising, taking part in the botched storming of the constabulary barracks in Kilmallock. While he managed to evade arrest by the authorities, his distant cousin, Peter O'Neill Crowley, was shot dead by the forces of the Crown in Kilclooney Wood. Crowley would go on to name one of his sons in his honour. Another of his cousins, Patrick Crowley, was arrested at Bruff, though he was later released.

Following the failed Fenian Rising, Crowley stayed very much involved with the republican movement, holding the position of secretary of the I.R.B. in the Hospital district up until the early 1880s, at which point he moved to Ballylanders with his sisters Kathleen, Johanna, and Delia. There, the siblings were employed in Margaret Fogarty's drapery.

== Career and marriage ==
As the years went by, Crowley earned enough money to buy Fogarty's Drapery, which he did in 1884 with the help of his Fenian cousin Patrick Crowley, though he would buy him out of the business in 1894. Beyond working as a draper, Crowley also became the village postmaster, and was on the committee to install a telegraph in Ballylanders during the 1890s. He also owned a camera and the equipment required to develop photographs, which he used for both personal and professional purposes. An early advocate of the Gaelic Athletic Association, he served as the treasurer of the Ballylanders Shamrocks Football Club.

On 19 February 1887, Timothy married Ellen Ryan of nearby Killeen, a farmer's daughter, and sixteen years his junior. Together, they had nine children: James Joseph Crowley (1889–1894), Tadhg Crowley (1890–1969), John Francis Crowley (1891–1942), Patrick Joseph Crowley (1893–1963), Joseph Mark Crowley (1894–1957), James Michael Crowley (1896–1944), Michael Thomas Crowley (1898–1952), Peter William Crowley (1900–1963) and Bridget Mary Crowley (1902–1970).

By the turn of the 20th century, Crowley's business was prospering. This enabled him to send his older sons to board at Rockwell College, while he sent his only daughter to the Presentation Convent in Dún Laoghaire. Crowley's Drapery, which he had built up since he took it over, consisted, by that point, of nine rooms, and had fourteen windows at its front – it was one of the most substantial buildings in Ballylanders.

== War of Independence ==
Crowley passed on his views to his children, and his sons became active in the Volunteer movement, and subsequently the I.R.B., while Bridie Crowley joined Cumann na mBan as a teenager. The only of the Crowley siblings not to join up was Patrick, who was training to be a priest at the time.

During the 1916 Rising, Timothy Crowley used his position as postmaster to intercept and forward British correspondence on to the Volunteer leaders, while his son John read the information that was coming in on the telegraph. The British were unaware of this, however, they caught on to the fact that the family were embroiled in the republican movement, and so, that same year, the postmaster of Kilmallock was ordered to come to Ballylanders to interview Timothy Crowley about his rebel activities, and pass on to him an order from the authorities to sever all connection with the Volunteers. Crowley refused to give an answer, however, upon consulting Eoin MacNeill on the matter, he and the rest of his family ceased their activities, on the surface at least. The following year, Crowley was badly injured in a baton charge by police outside of Galbally barracks, where his son Tadhg was being held, with him having to be tended to by his daughter Bridie afterwards.

By 1920, during the War of Independence, Crowley gained the attention of the R.I.C. after allowing his drapery to be used in the attack on Ballylanders R.I.C. barracks in April 1920 – having been asked by one of his sons for permission to use it, he did not object. He also attracted attention from the British after buying and also renting out a number of motor cars, which were being used to transport members of the I.R.A. The British decided to take action against the Crowleys, and, in early July, they planted a bomb outside of Crowley's Drapery, which exploded, smashing all the windows. The constables responsible for it came from Kilmallock, with the officer in charge stealing a bicycle from the shop which he would later gift to his young son.

At 3 a.m. on the morning of 16 July 1920, a shootout took place between the R.I.C. and Crowley's sons, who were holed up in the drapery. Eventually, the Crowleys ran out of ammunition, with John, Michael, and Peter being arrested, while the rest escaped to the mountains. After the initial attack, Timothy Crowley heard ahead of time that the Crown forces planned to attack the drapery once more on the morning of 25 July 1920, and so he pre-emptively emptied his safe, taking with him a number of documents and photographs to the house of his brother-in-law, Denis O'Grady, across the street. That night, he and his wife Ellen stayed there. With the building having been temporarily abandoned, British soldiers doused it with petrol and set it on fire, burning the drapery to the ground. The damaged caused to the premises and stock amounted to £22,500, worth in excess of one million euro today.

While, at first, Timothy Crowley was left alone by the British authorities, police arrived in Ballylanders not long after to interrogate him. They asked him where the automobiles in his possession were, to which he reportedly replied, "If I knew, I would not tell you". He was then arrested and thrown in Limerick Jail, where he was held without any charge. At the time of his arrest, Crowley had just recently turned 73. There was much discussion between various elements of the British army over what was to be done with him, and, specifically, over whether or not he should be compensated for the money he was owed after the destruction of his drapery.

The Major-General of the 6th Division wrote to General HQ in Dublin Castle saying, "Payment of such an amount to this man is most undesirable and is calculated to make us a laughing stock to the rebels". In another letter, a lieutenant colonel of the 1st Division, said, referring to Crowley, "The man himself, though old, is the most notorious rebel in the Galtees". He went on to declare that, "If he obtains the money allocated to him by the Crown, it will be used in all probability for the murder of the Crown forces". While many within British intelligence wanted Timothy Crowley tried and convicted, it was eventually decided to release him in September 1920.

== Death ==
After his release, and due to the destruction of his home, Timothy and his wife moved in with her brother-in-law John Culhane, a draper in Glin. It was there that he died on 19 October 1921, aged 74, from sudden heart failure. His funeral was widely reported upon, and was one of the largest ever seen in that part of Limerick. Thousands of people attended his burial in the Crowley family plot in St. John's Graveyard, Knockainey, with hundreds of Volunteers from various companies marching behind the hearse to the graveside. After the grave was closed, volleys were fired and the Last Post sounded.
