= Philip Crowley =

Philip Crowley may refer to:

- Philip Crowley (businessman) (1903–1977), English businessman
- Philip Crowley (entomologist) (1837–1900), English entomologist
- Philip J. Crowley (born 1951), spokesman for the United States State Department
