= Stephen Crowley (cricketer) =

English cricketer (born 1961)

Personal information
- Full name: Stephen Christopher Crowley
- Born: 18 December 1961 (age 64); Hillingdon, Middlesex, England
- Batting: Right-handed
- Role: Wicket-keeper

Domestic team information
- Years: Team
- 1993–1996: Norfolk

Career statistics
Competition	List A
Matches	4
Runs scored	5
Batting average	1.66
100s/50s	0/0
Top score	2*
Catches/stumpings	4/2
- Source: Cricinfo, 28 June 2011

Stephen Christopher Crowley (born 18 December 1961) is an English former cricketer who played as a wicket-keeper for Norfolk County Cricket Club. He was born at Hillingdon in Middlesex in 1961.

Crowley made his debut for Norfolk County Cricket Club in the 1993 MCCA Knockout Trophy against Bedfordshire. Crowley played Minor counties cricket for Norfolk from 1993 to 1996, which included 27 Minor Counties Championship matches and 5 MCCA Knockout Trophy matches. He made his List A debut against the Warwickshire in the 1993 NatWest Trophy. He made 3 further List A appearances, the last coming against Hampshire in the 1996 NatWest Trophy. In his 4 List A matches, he scored 5 runs at an average of 1.66, with a high score of 2 not out. Behind the stumps he took 4 catches and 2 stumpings.
