= Philip Crowley (businessman) =

Philip Lewis Crowley
- Philip Crowley, c.1950
- Born: 20 May 1903; Lewisham, Kent, UK
- Died: 10 February 1977 (aged 73); Beaconsfield, Berkshire, UK
- Occupations: Business, Printing, Politician
- Spouse: Ruth Russell Graham
- Children: Peter Crowley, David Crowley, Mary Crowley
- Parent(s): James Lewis Crowley and Kate Nind Crowley

Philip Lewis Crowley, A.C.I.S. (20 May 1903 – 10 February 1977) was a prominent Slough businessman and politician from the 1940s until his retirement in 1968. He was the managing director for Intertype Ltd., a leading producer of typesetting machines in the United Kingdom from World War II through until the late 1980s. During his life in Slough, he was an alderman for the Conservative Party, and during his later life, he was often encouraged to stand to be an M.P., but refused on the grounds that he could not successfully run a company and be a member of parliament. He reached the post of chairman of the Eton and Slough Conservative Association, a post he held for nearly ten years until his retirement from politics in 1954.

== Early years ==
Philip Crowley was born in Lewisham in the suburbs of South London to the already elderly Victorian stockbroker, James Lewis Crowley, and his second wife Kate Nind Ward. When Philip was born in 1903, his father was already 67 and had fathered four by his first marriage, all of whom were older than Kate Ward, who was 37 years his junior.

James Crowley's first wife, Isabel Crowley (née Crowley) was his second cousin, and ironically, his eldest son, Edward, also married his second cousin. Isabel died in 1901, and James remarried the next year

=== Marriage ===
Philip Crowley met his wife, Ruth Graham, in 1924 and they married in 1925. Their first child, Peter, was born in 1926. The couple had another son, David, in 1932 and a daughter, Mary, in 1935.

== Work at Intertype ==
=== Accountant ===
After nine years at an accountancy firm, Crowley answered a job advertisement to become an accounts clerk at Intertype. Then merely the daughter firm of an American selling agency, Intertype comprised three rooms in King's Cross.

=== Secretary ===
After one year as the accounts clerk, Crowley was promoted by the new M.D. to be the company's secretary. During this time, Intertype began to expand, now employing over 500 workers. In 1950, Crowley was promoted again, to director, and then again to managing director on 1 January 1952.

=== Managing director ===
Crowley was considered both a kind and proficient boss at Intertype, and the company enjoyed considerable success during his period of management, selling Intertype typesetting machines to almost every major newspaper that operated in the southern half of Britain during that time.
