= Joseph Crowley (disambiguation) =

Joe Crowley (born 1962) is a former U.S. representative from New York.

Joseph Crowley may also refer to:

- Joseph B. Crowley (1858–1931), U.S. representative from Illinois
- Joseph Martin Crowley (1871–?), member of the Wisconsin State Assembly
- Joseph Robert Crowley (1915–2003), American Roman Catholic bishop
- Joseph N. Crowley (1933–2017), president of the University of Nevada, Reno, 1978 to 2001
- Joe Crowley (American football) (1919–2008), professional football end and defensive back
- Joe Crowley (presenter), British television presenter and broadcast journalist
