= Thomas Crowley =

Thomas Crowley may refer to:

- Thomas Crowley (American politician) (1935–2013), American businessman and legislator in Vermont
- Thomas Crowley (Australian politician) (1901–1965), member of the Queensland Legislative Assembly
- Thomas Crowley (soldier) (1949–1995), Irishman who fought in the Croatian War of Independence
