= Ballylanders =

Village in County Limerick, Ireland

Ballylanders Baile an Londraigh
- Village
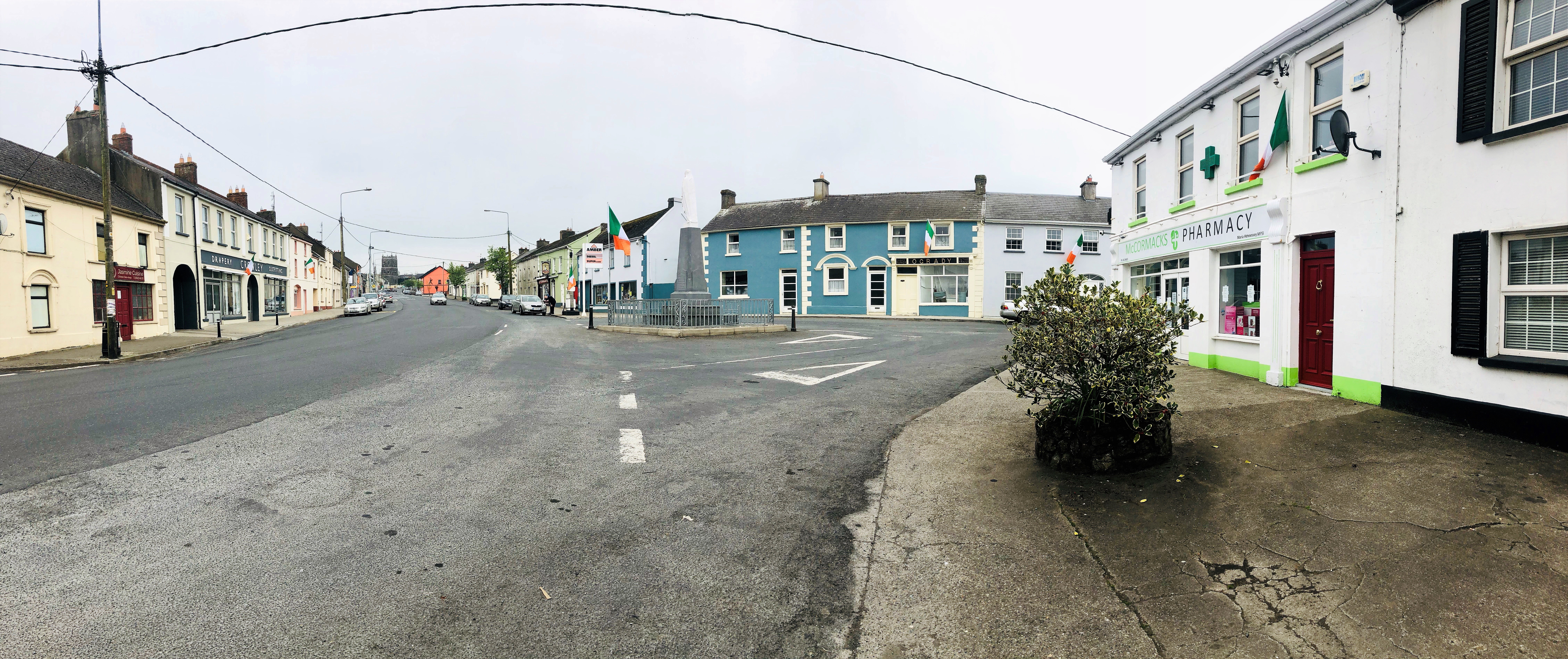
- Main Street

- Location in Ireland
- Coordinates: 52°22′22″N 8°20′58″W
- Country: Ireland
- Province: Munster
- County: County Limerick
- Elevation: 146 m (479 ft)

Population (2022)
  - Total: 337
- Time zone: UTC+0 (WET)
  - Summer (DST): UTC-1 (IST (WEST))
- Irish Grid Reference: R810270
- Website: ballylanders.com

Ballylanders (Irish: Baile an Londraigh) is a village in south County Limerick, Ireland. It is 37 km (23 mi) south of Limerick and 13 km (8 mi) north of Mitchelstown, on the R513 road. The 2022 census recorded a population of 337 people. The village is in a townland and civil parish of the same name.

== Name ==
Historically the name translates as "de Londra's town" and is most likely of Norman origin and referring to a popular Anglo-Norman derived family surname of "Landers" or alternatively "de Londra" can give its translation as "Town of the Londoner".

== Amenities ==
There is a holy well close to the village which is the focal point of the Pattern day, held annually on 15 August, this is one of the major such fair days in the locality.

The present-day Catholic parish church is of a modern circular design. The first church in the village was a Church of Ireland church, dated to the 19th century, is still in existence today as a private dwelling house. The arches of the church are still visible from the inside and are preserved for aesthetic value.

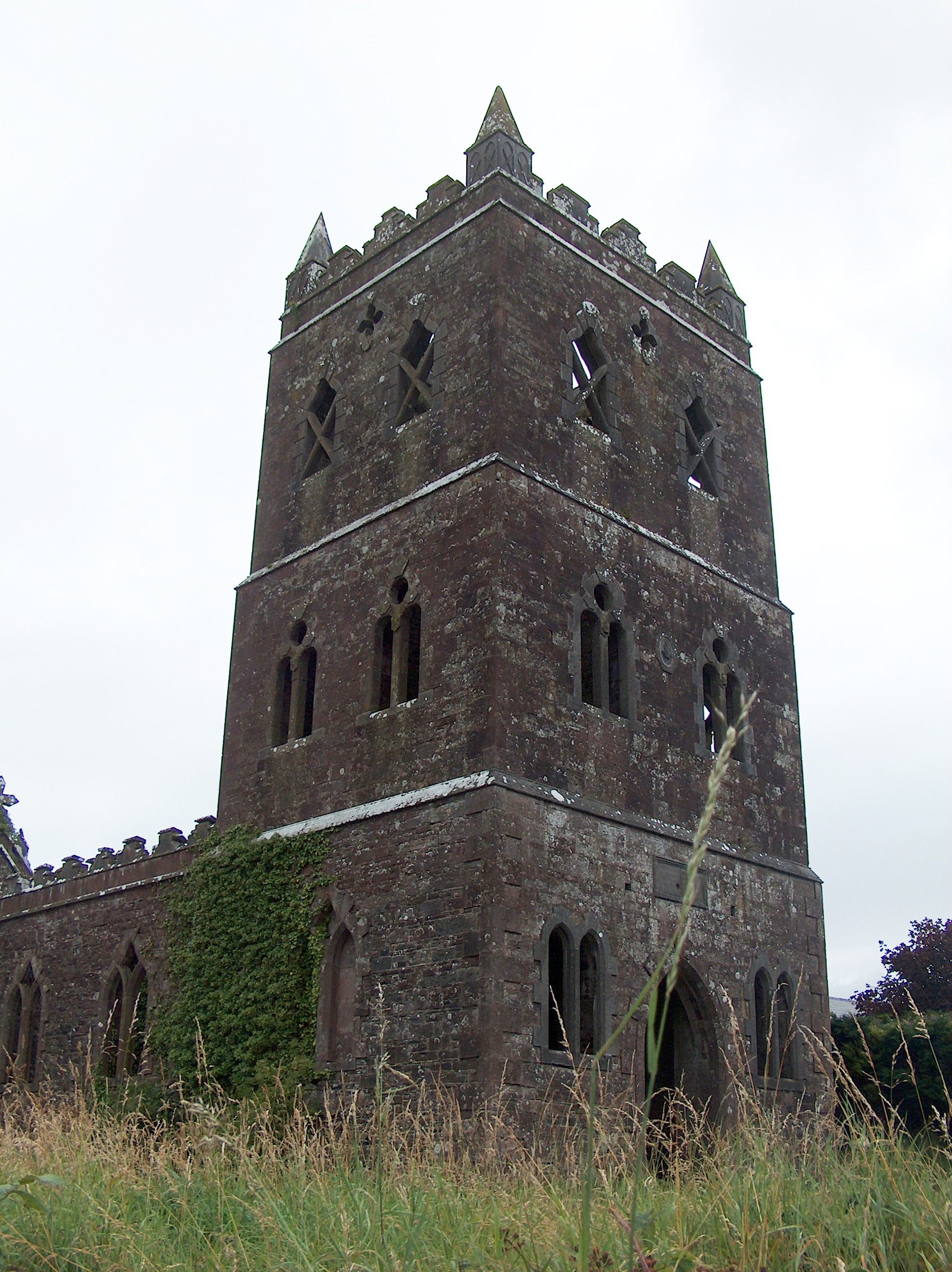
Derelict church on Cork Road, Ballylanders

The former Church of Ireland building, built in 1861, was designed by Welland and Gillespie. Its entry in the National Inventory of Architectural Heritage describes it as a "landmark building within Ballylanders" and as having "some unusual architectural features including crests of the Earls of Kingston".

== Ecology ==
Griston Bog, on the west side of the village, is a nature reserve and bird sanctuary which is home to birds, insects and plants. The 2023-2028 conservation plan for the site notes that this is a lowland raised bog. The habitats on this nature reserve include cutover bog regenerated as marsh, raised bog, wet grassland, artificial pond, reed and large sedge swamps, drainage ditches, wet pedunculate oak-ash woodland and conifer plantation. The site does not have any protected site status. The raised bog reserve and education centre at the site is managed by Ballyhoura Heritage and Environment.

Rare and/or indicator plant and animal species occurring at the site include the Common frog (Rana temporaria), Meadow pipit (Anthus pratensis), Bog moss (Sphagnum spp), lichen (Cladonia spp.), Sundew (Drosera anglica) and Common lizard (Lacerta vivipara). Griston Bog is of ornithological significance for a range of bird species, such as the Hen Harrier (Circus cyaneus) and Merlin (Falco columbarius).

== Sports ==
There has been a Gaelic Athletic Association football team in Ballylanders since 1888 - the team then were the Ballylanders Shamrocks. Ballylanders won the County Junior Football Championship in 1911. The local Gaelic Athletic Association club, Ballylanders GAA, won the Limerick Senior Football Championship in 1917, 1999, 2007 and 2014.

A Ballylanders Ladies' Gaelic Football Association (LGFA) club was established in 2000. Since then, the club has grown and fields teams at underage levels and two adult teams. The LGFA club were Junior Champions in 2010, Intermediate Champions in 2014 and Senior Champions in 2015, 2016 and 2017.

Ballylanders Soccer Club was established in 1987 and acquired its own club grounds in 1992. This 7.5-acre (30,000 m^{2}) site has a clubhouse, two full-size playing pitches, a full-size floodlit training pitch, and an amenity walk around the perimeter.

== Notable people ==
- John Crowley (1891-1942) was an Irish revolutionary and hunger striker, holding the Guinness World Record for the longest hunger strike in history - 94 days. Participating alongside his brother and several other prisoners, the 1920 Cork hunger strike occurred at time as that of Lord Mayor of Cork, Terence MacSwiney.
- Peter William Crowley (1900-1963) was an Irish revolutionary and hunger striker who took part in the same hunger strike as his elder brother John.
- Tadhg Crowley (1890-1970) was an Irish Fianna Fáil politician. He was first elected to Dáil Éireann as a Teachta Dála (TD) for the Limerick constituency at the June 1927 general election.
- Frank Dineen (1862–1916) was an athlete of the early 1880s who later became the only person to ever hold both posts of president (1885–1898) and Secretary (1898–1901) of the Gaelic Athletic Association. In 1907, he fronted the purchase of the Croke Park site out of his own personal finances.

== See also ==
- List of towns and villages in Ireland
