= Michael Crowley (soldier) =

- Born: c. 1829; Rochester, New York
- Died: May 12, 1888; Boston, Massachusetts
- Military career
- Allegiance: United States of America
- Branch: United States Army
- Rank: Private
- Unit: (New York (state)) 2nd New York Volunteer Cavalry Regiment - Company A
- Conflicts: Battle of Waynesboro, Virginia
- Awards: Medal of Honor

Private Michael Crowley (c. 1829 – May 12, 1888) was an American soldier who fought in the American Civil War. Crowley received the country's highest award for bravery during combat, the Medal of Honor, for his action during the Battle of Waynesboro in Virginia on 2 March 1865. He was honored with the award on 26 March 1865.

== Biography ==
Crowley was born in Rochester, New York in about 1829. He enlisted into the 22nd New York Cavalry. He died on 12 May 1888.

== Medal of Honor citation ==
Capture of the enemy flag.

== See also ==
- List of American Civil War Medal of Honor recipients: A–F
