= 1972 Irish hunger strike =

Political protest by the Provisional IRA

The 1972 Belfast hunger strike was a five-week long hunger strike of Provisional Irish Republican Army (IRA) and Protestant prisoners to achieve political status. It took place between April and June 1972. After William Whitelaw, the home secretary, promised to grant Special Category Status, the IRA announced they would end the strike.
