= Bob D. Crowley =

American businessman

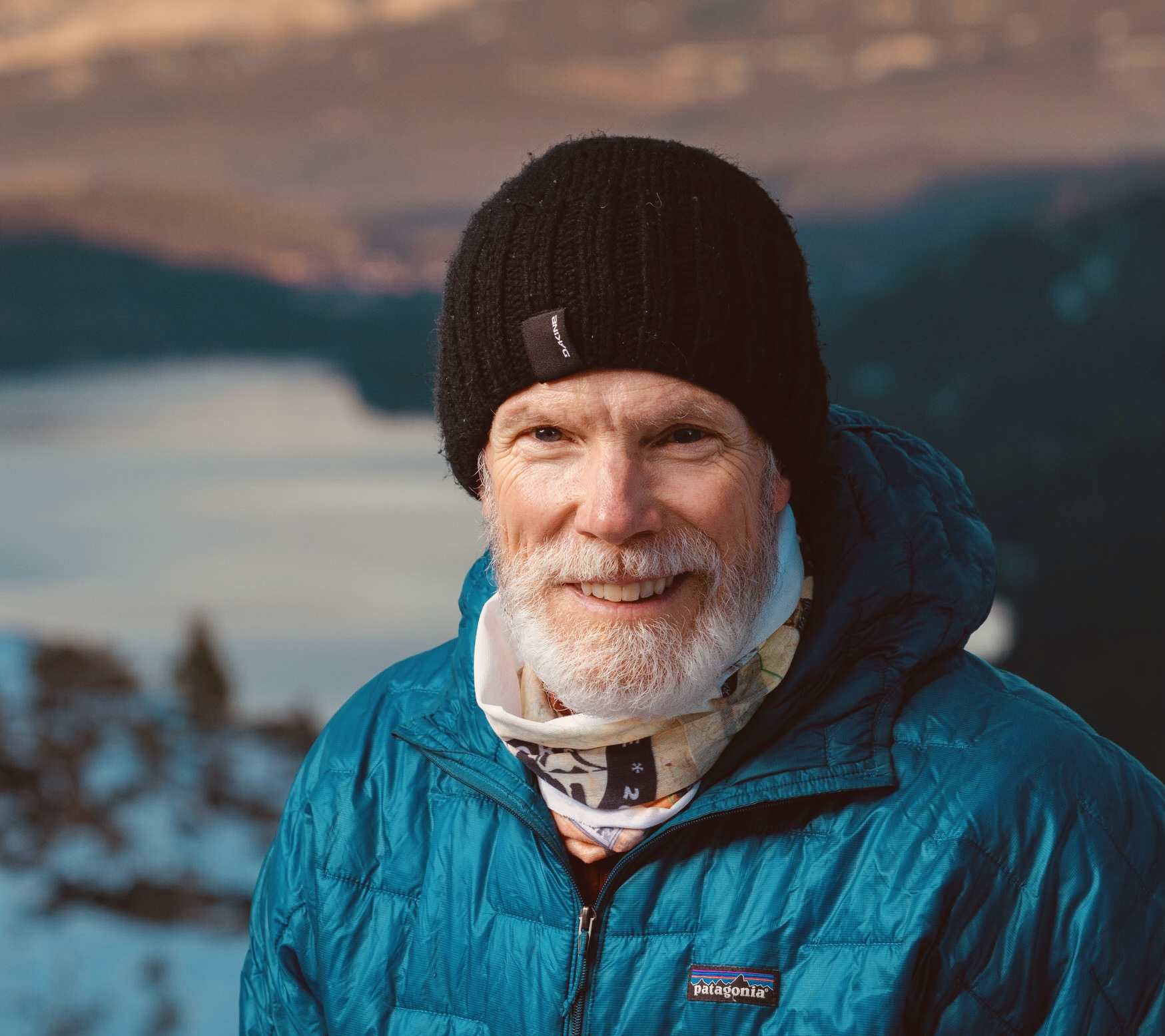
Bob D. Crowley

Bob Crowley is an American private equity investor, software entrepreneur and athlete.

He is currently co-founder of History Expeditions, a non-profit focused with a mission to discover American West tales and trails which have been lost to time, and honor inspiring heroes of history.

During his early career (1980-2003) he was an entrepreneur in the cable television and software sectors with American Cablesystems, CableData, Kenan Systems, Arbortext and Bowstreet; all of which were sold to Fortune 500 companies.

in 2003 he co-founded The Mustang Group in Boston, a private equity firm investing in small and medium-sized private companies which included Cascade Lacrosse, Vermont Teddy Bear, Scribe Software and Renovation Brands.

As an athlete Bob has completed more than 200 ultra-distance events including Western States 100 Mile Endurance Run, Hardrock 100, Tahoe 200, Moab 240 and Tor des Geants.

In 2020 he was elected president of the International Trail Running Association (ITRA), a Swiss-based non-profit responsible for the global trail running community of approximately 2 million. Bob also led one of the largest trail running clubs in the world, Trail Animals Running Club (TARC) for decades.

He currently mentors numerous entrepreneurs, founders and CEOs of for-profit and non-profits.
