= Daniel Crowley =

Daniel or Dan Crowley may refer to:

- Daniel J. Crowley (1921–1998), American art historian and cultural anthropologist
- Dan Crowley (rugby union) (born 1965), retired Australian rugby union player
- Dan Crowley (Canadian football) (born 1973), retired Canadian football player from the United States
- Daniel Crowley (footballer) (born 1997), English footballer
