= John W. Crowley =

American test pilot and aerospace engineer

John W. Crowley, Jr.
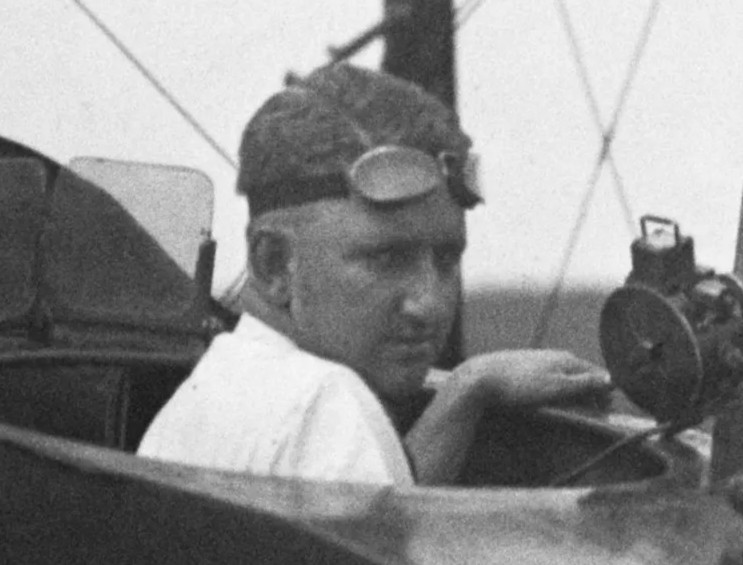
- Crowley in a biplane, c. 1925
- Born: May 24, 1899; Boston, Massachusetts, U.S.
- Died: July 25, 1974 (aged 75); Denver, Colorado, U.S.
- Education: Massachusetts Institute of Technology (BS)
- Occupations: Pilot; aerospace engineer
- Years active: 1921-1959
- Spouse: Margaret Wells
- Awards: NASA Distinguished Service Medal

John W. "Gus" Crowley, Jr. (May 24, 1899 – July 25, 1974) was an early American aerospace engineer. He became the first civilian research pilot for the National Advisory Committee for Aeronautics in 1921, and the first director of NASA headquarters in 1958.

== Early life ==
Crowley was born in Boston in 1899. He studied mechanical engineering at the Massachusetts Institute of Technology, graduating in 1920.

== Career ==
After graduating from MIT, Crowley joined the National Advisory Committee for Aeronautics (NACA) at the Langley Memorial Aeronautical Laboratory in 1921 as an associate aeronautical engineer and the first civilian research pilot. He and Thomas Carroll, the first civilian test pilot at NACA, used the Curtiss JN-4 "Jenny" biplane as part of the earliest "instrumented tests of control and stability" to help develop tools to "measure and record the forces acting on aircraft". He also published some of the earliest aeronautical studies on seaplanes.

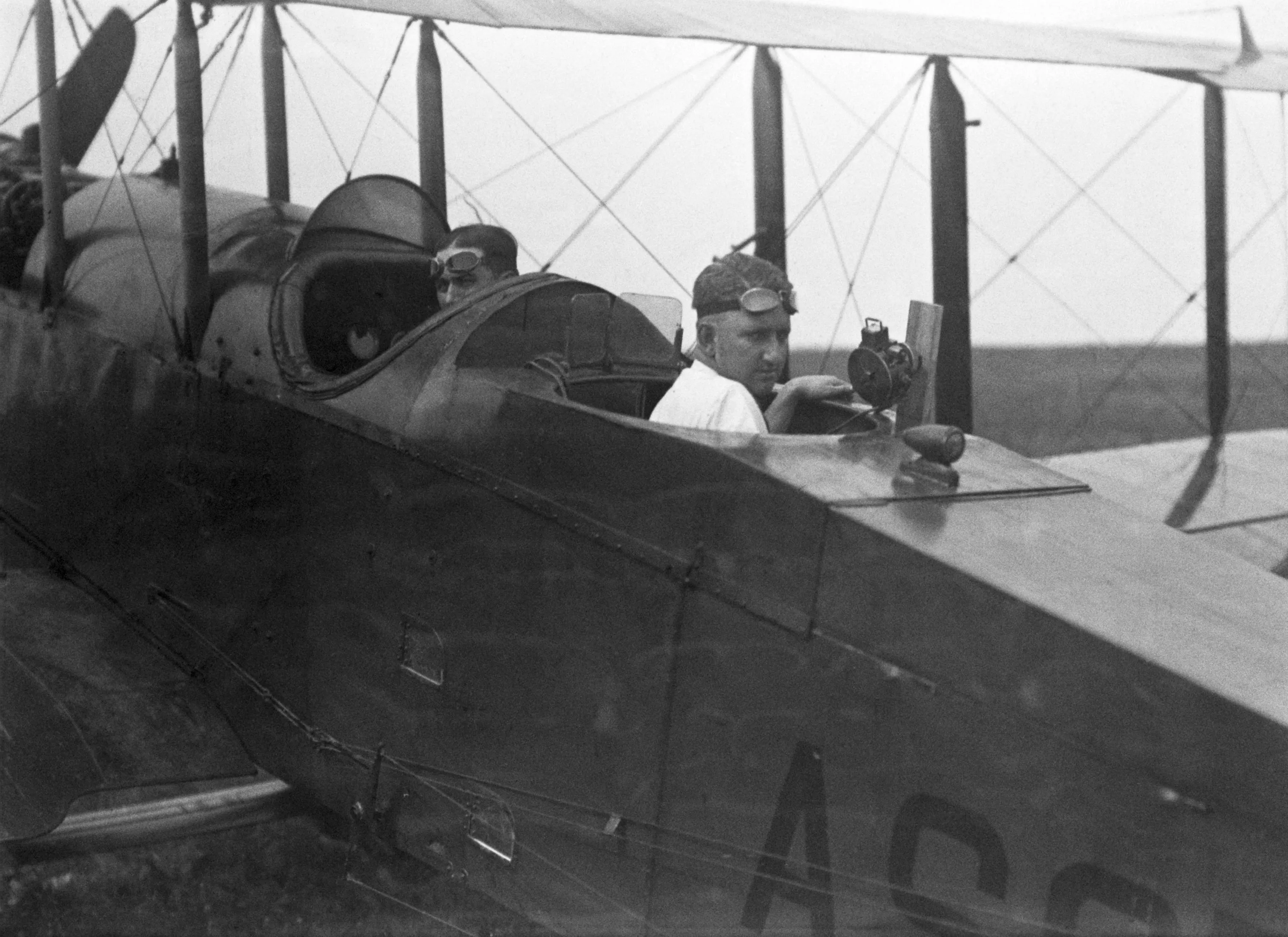
Thomas Carroll (front cockpit) and John W. Crowley in a Curtiss JN-4 "Jenny" biplane (1925)

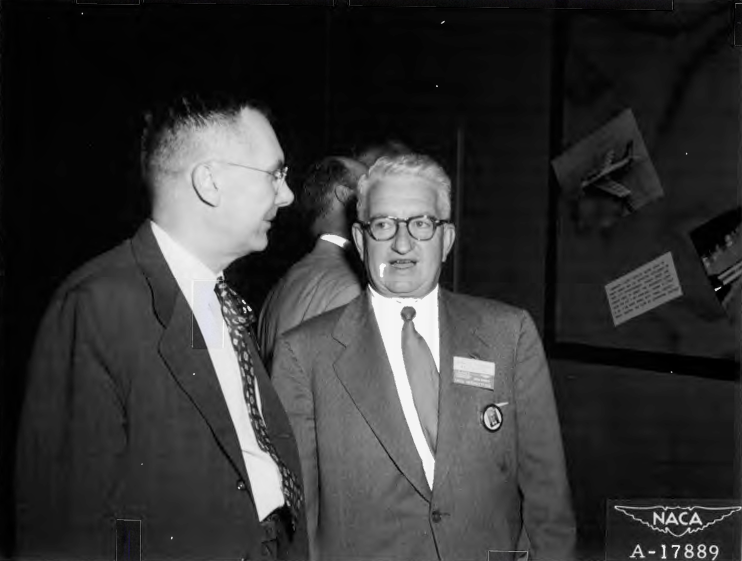
Dr. Hugh L. Dryden (left) and John W. Crowley (right) at a NACA event in Moffett Field, California (1952)

He became head of research at Langley in 1943. Crowley moved to Washington, D.C. in 1945 to become acting director of aeronautical research at NACA. In 1947, he became associate director for research until the establishment of NASA in 1958, after which he became the first director of aeronautical and space research. He retired in 1959.

He was member of the President's Scientific Research Board and Special Board of Inquiry on Air Safety. He was also on the Guided Missile Committee of the Research and Development Board and the technical advisor to the President's Airport Commission. He was a fellow of the Institute of Aeronautical Sciences (IAS), precursor to the AIAA. Crowley was the first person to receive NASA's highest service medal in 1959, and one of only three people awarded the NASA seal (issued 1959 to 1961) along with Mercury program astronauts Alan B. Shepard and Virgil Grissom.

He died in Denver in 1974, aged 75.

== Personal life ==
He married Margaret Wells. The couple had two daughters.

== Awards ==
- NASA Distinguished Service Medal (1959)
