= Peter Crowley (revolutionary) =

Irish revolutionary and hunger striker (1900–1963)

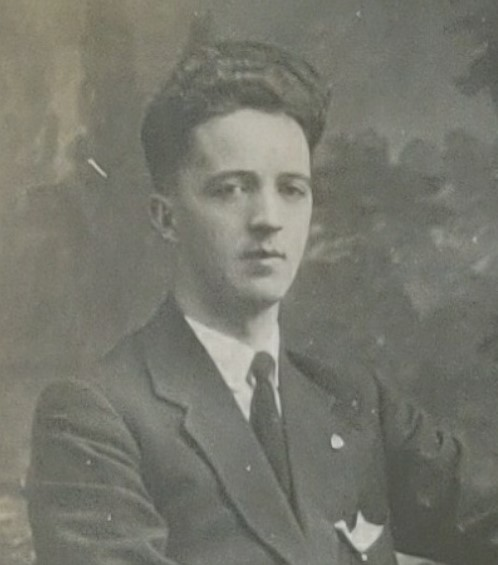
- Born: 13 July 1900; Ballylanders, County Limerick, Ireland)
- Died: 8 April 1963 (aged 62); Donnycarney, Dublin, Ireland
- Spouse: Minnie Daly (m. 1928)
- Children: 2
- Father: Timothy Crowley
- Relatives: Tadhg Crowley (brother)

Peter William Crowley (13 July 1900 – 8 April 1963) was an Irish revolutionary and hunger striker, holding the Guinness World Records for the longest hunger strike in history. From 11 August to 12 November 1920, Crowley, along with 10 others, underwent a hunger strike for 94 days in Cork County Gaol, demanding the reinstatement of their political status and release from prison. The 1920 Cork hunger strike took place at the same time as that of Terence MacSwiney, Lord Mayor of Cork.

He came from the prominent Irish republican Crowley family of Ballylanders, being the son of Timothy Crowley, and the brother of Tadhg Crowley and John Francis Crowley, his fellow hunger striker.

== Early life ==
Peter Crowley was born on 13 July 1900 in the village of Ballylanders, County Limerick, as the son of local draper and postmaster Timothy Crowley (1847 - 1921), who had fought in the Fenian Rising of 1867, and Ellen Ryan Crowley (1863 - 1951). He was the second youngest of eight siblings, all but one of whom were boys. He had a well-off childhood, with the Crowleys making much profit from their drapery, which is still an open shop in the village. Crowley attended the local national school in Ballylanders.

== Revolutionary activities ==
Crowley, along with all of his family except for his brother Patrick, who was studying to be a priest, played roles in the Irish revolutionary period. Peter Crowley had joined the Irish Volunteers by 1916, and so had the rest of the Crowley brothers. His sister, Bridget Crowley, later O'Donnell, was a member of Cumann na mBan from the age of 14.

=== 1910s ===
In the week starting with Sunday, 23 April 1916, and including the Easter Rising of 24 to 29 April, Crowley served with the Ballylanders Company under the command of William P. Hanahan. Through this period, Crowley made ammunition and cut communications lines in preparation for attack on Royal Irish Constabulary (R.I.C.) barracks in the area and was mobilised for active service. He took part in "local activities" under order of his commanding officers "until arrival of countermanding orders". Thereafter, he awaited further orders.

In the periods comprising 1 to 22 April 1916 and 30 April 1916 to 31 March 1917, Crowley, again serving under William P. Hanahan up until his arrest and from then on Donnchadh Hannigan, carried out military orders and instructions from commanding officers. As a consequence of this, he was arrested by British forces at Ballylanders in July 1916 and detained in the Military Detention Barracks Cork for two weeks. Before and after his arrest, Crowley took part in the making of ammunition, preparing for military service, drilling, and carrying despatches.

Over the course of 1 April 1917 to 31 March 1918, Crowley, now under Donnchadh Hannigan, took part in raids for arms, ammunition and equipment, which he then took care of and protected. Along with the some of his comrades, he took part in "general preparations and activities to resist Conscription by force of arms". In Galbally, he was engaged in operations where members of the R.I.C. were injured in baton charges and the barracks was damaged by the Irish Volunteers. It was during this time that Crowley was enrolled as a member of the Irish Republican Brotherhood (I.R.B) and took part in all Irish Volunteer associated activities.

During the time from 1 April 1918 to 31 March 1919, and commanded by Sean T. Riordan, Crowley "carried out all orders and military activities as ordered by officers in charge as a member of the Irish Volunteers". He made ammunition, and took part in training, drilling and general preparation for active service in connection with resisting conscription and any other service required of him. During that period activities were stalled owing to resistance to conscription and general elections.

=== 1920s ===
From 1 April 1919 to 31 March 1920, Crowley, once more serving under Sean T. Riordan, was connected with activities associated with the "Knocklong Train Raid", and he carried despatches, trained in the use of arms, which he also collected, and spent time parading and drilling, among other activities during this period.

In mid-1920 Crowley was involved in the attack and destruction of Ballylanders R.I.C. Barracks. He was engaged with the attack on Kilmallock Barracks as well and took part in defending his father Timothy Crowley's house in Ballylanders when it was bombed by British forces on 6 July 1920.

Crowley took part in an ambush on the R.I.C. at Ballinahinch and on both the R.I.C and British military at Emly. He fought in the streets of Ballylanders on 16 July 1920, when he was captured and imprisoned by the British. He was tried by court martial on the charge of taking part in an attack with firearms on Crown forces and was sentenced to three years in prison, where he underwent what would become the longest hunger strike in history, lasting 94 days.

It was during this time that, from 11 August to 12 November 1920 in Cork County Gaol, Peter Crowley, along with his brother John Crowley, Michael Fitzgerald, Joe Murphy, Thomas Donovan, Michael Burke, Michael O'Reilly, Christopher Upton, John Power, Joseph Kelly and Seán Hennessy, underwent a hunger strike of 94 days, demanding reinstatement of political status and release from prison. This hunger strike was held parallel with that of Lord Mayor of Cork, Terence MacSwiney, who died in October 1920 after his 74th day on hunger strike. Peter Crowley and the other strikers still hold the Guinness World Record for longest hunger strike, though the record is no longer included in editions of the book to prevent people from starving themselves for the record.

From 1 April to 11 July 1921, Crowley was imprisoned on Spike Island, in Cork Harbour.

Over the time between 12 July 1921 to 30 June 1922, Crowley was working under his sister Bridie's often commander Patrick O’Donnell. He was involved in no military engagements, and spent around ten days recovering in the Mater Hospital in Dublin from his hunger strike.

In the period from 1 July 1922 to 31 March 1923 and under Patrick O’Donnell's command once more, Crowley "carried out all orders of commanding officers in connection with general activities, training etc. up to capture by Irish Free State forces about 19th August 1922". He was then held prisoner for two weeks in Mitchelstown Court House, after which he was released unconditionally due to his ill health. Outside of jail, he carried despatches in connection with military operation and engagements at Kilmallock. He took part in the destruction of Galbally Police Barracks and attacked Free State posts at Bruff and Rockbarton.

From 1 April to 30 September 1923, Crowley was unable to render any active service due to his ill health and was medically advised to leave the country. He sailed for the United States on 15 April 1923.

=== 1930s ===
In 1932, Peter applied for a military service pension under the Army Pensions Act 1932. However, nothing came of this due to his difficulties in getting to necessary medical certificate to prove his treatment in the Mater Hospital. On his 1935 pension application, he wrote that he was receiving a weekly salary of £2, 8 shillings and 7 pence as a paper keeper in the Department of Industry and Commerce. This sum included the cost of living expenses.

== Later life ==
By the outbreak of the Civil War, Crowley, having been medically advised to leave Ireland, was living in the Bronx, New York, and working as a ticket agent for the Interborough Rapid Transit Company. He married Minnie Daly (1906-1991) in 1928, and their first son, Peter Maurice Crowley, was born in New York in December 1929.

Crowley, believing that the "foot soldiers" of the war would be rewarded under the new Fianna Fáil government, returned to Ireland against the wishes of his wife Minnie, who wanted to stay in New York. He lived with his brothers in Ballylanders for about three months, and later moved to Collins Avenue, Dublin. Another son, Tadhg Crowley, was born to them in 1934. Crowley would spend the rest of his working life in the civil service.

== Death ==
Peter William Crowley died from lung cancer on 8 April 1963 in his home on Collins Avenue.
