= 1920 Cork hunger strike =

Part of the Irish War of Independence

After the death of the Irish revolutionary Thomas Ashe on hunger strike (25 September 1917) Irish Republicans prisoners carried out several hunger strikes with their demands being granted. The 1920 Cork hunger strike occurred in late 1920, during the Irish War of Independence, when 65 men interned without trial in Cork County Gaol went on hunger strike, demanding release from prison, and reinstatement of their status as political prisoners. Beginning on 11 August 1920, they were joined the following day by the Lord Mayor of Cork, Terence MacSwiney imprisoned in HM Prison Brixton, London (MacSwiney died after 74 days on hunger strike on 25 October 1920). A week into the hunger strike, all but 11 of the hunger strikers were released or deported to prison in England. The remaining 11 internees in Cork were being held without charges and were never convicted of a crime.

In late 1920, British authorities then decided to resist the hunger strike tactic and warned that there would be no further concessions to the men on strike in Cork jail. Michael Fitzgerald died after 68 days, while Joe Murphy died after 79 days. The nine surviving hunger strikers – Michael Burke, John Crowley, (Note: Peter (1900–1963) and John Crowley (1891–1942) were brothers from the Irish republican family of Ballylanders, being two sons of Timothy Crowley.) Peter Crowley, Seán Hennessy, Joseph Kenny, Thomas O'Donovan, Michael O'Reilly, John Power, and Christopher Upton – continued on for 94 days, ending their fast on 12 November 1920, following orders from Arthur Griffith.

This hunger strike drew worldwide attention and sympathy to the cause of Irish independence. The nine survivors of the 1920 Cork hunger strike hold the Guinness World Record for the longest hunger strike in history, in which no food was consumed, whether as a result of force-feeding or otherwise.

== Timeline ==
On 11 August 1920, just over 60 men in Cork County Gaol went on hunger strike, demanding that the status of political prisoners be granted to them, and that they be released from prison. Terence MacSwiney, the Lord Mayor of Cork, was, around the same time, charged with possession of "seditious articles and documents", before being imprisoned in Cork with a two-year sentence.

On 12 August, MacSwiney joined the others on strike. In an attempt to break it up, the majority of the men on strike in Cork, including MacSwiney, were sent to various prisons across Britain, including Brixton and Winchester. The British authorities hoped that this would serve to demoralise the prisoners in Cork and bring about the strike's end. Eleven men remained on strike in Cork: Peter and John Crowley, Christopher Upton, and Michael O'Reilly, as well as Joseph Kenny of Grenagh, Cork, Seán Hennessy of Limerick City, Michael Burke of Foulkstown, Tipperary, John Power of Rosegreen, Tipperary, Thomas O'Donovan of Emly, Limerick, Michael Fitzgerald of Fermoy, and Joseph Murphy of Cork City.

Documentation, published in The Nine Survivors (2021), indicates that nine days into the strike, JJ Kinsella, the prison's chief medical officer, warned that "an appalling incident is imminent", and called on the British government to intervene and release the hunger strikers. It was however decided, early on, that the government would take an approach of ignoring the strikers' demands, out of fear that to do otherwise would undermine the judicial system and serve as a morale boost to the IRA. This was the view expressed by Andrew Bonar Law, who was deputising at Westminster due to Prime Minister David Lloyd George being on holiday. Lloyd George returned two weeks into the strike, and repeated Bonar Law's decision that the hunger strikers' demands would not be met. This was despite a personal request from King George V to release them, as well as criticism from Winston Churchill, who was Secretary of State for War at the time.

== Public opinion & religion ==
Public opinion across Ireland was largely in support of the hunger strike, and, at three points throughout the strike, on 24 August, 22 September, and 15 October, the workers of Cork City, as part of an action organised by the Cork Civic and Labour Council, did not attend work, so as to allow themselves to go to Masses being held for the strikers. There were also near-constant vigils held by members of the public and relatives of the hunger strikers outside of Cork Gaol. As the historian Gabriel Doherty put it in his article on the hunger strike: "over the course of the strike a truly staggering number of Masses for their intentions were sponsored by practically every firm, every residential area, and every public body and private organisation in Cork (and many well beyond)".

Religion played a role in the hunger strike's success, due to the backing the strike received from the Catholic hierarchy, both in Ireland and abroad. While it was denounced by some priests, mainly in England, as leading to suicide and therefore a sin, the majority of the clergy in Ireland threw their support behind it, portraying the strikers as soldiers willing to fight and die for their country. On a trip to Cork, Archbishop Spence of Adelaide, Australia, criticised the response of the British government to the hunger strike.

== Newspaper coverage & support in the US ==
Gabriel Doherty notes in his article on the strike that another factor in the significance of the Cork hunger strike was the coverage it received in newspapers across the world. In Ireland, most newspapers were supportive of the strike, including the Cork Examiner. Several newspapers in Britain, while not necessarily favourable of the strikers' IRA activities, held sympathy for their suffering in prison, a sentiment which influenced how the British public felt about the hunger strike, while the reporting on the strike also further informed them about what was going on in Ireland during the War of Independence. As time went on, sections of British public began to resent their government's actions in Ireland as a result of this coverage.

A number of other British newspapers spread rumours that the hunger strikers were being fed by visitors in an attempt to undermine support for them, though any effectiveness of this strategy was lost following the deaths in October 1920 of Michael Fitzgerald and Joseph Murphy in Cork, and Terence MacSwiney in Brixton, proving that the hunger strikers were not being fed.

Beyond the British Isles, there was support from America, home to a large Irish community. Support there was further drummed up by Fr. Patrick Crowley, a priest in Montana, and a brother of Peter and John Crowley, who gave interviews to the American press. Future international leaders, among them India's Mahatma Gandhi and Jawaharlal Nehru, Vietnam's Ho Chi Minh, and Italy's Benito Mussolini, all noted at various points that they were moved by the hunger strike.

== End of strike and effects on survivors ==
As the strike neared the end of October (after the deaths of Fitzgerald and Murphy), it was reported that three of the strikers, O'Donovan, Burke, and Kenny, were on the verge of death, with the Cork Constitution noting that they were "not expected to survive another day". Despite this, the three of them, along with the six others still on hunger strike, survived for two more weeks, when the strike was finally called off by the orders of Arthur Griffith, the acting President of the Irish Republic. As it was increasingly clear that the British would not change their policy of refusing the hunger strikers' demands, he ordered the strike to end on 12 November 1920, saying: "I am of the opinion that our countrymen in Cork Prison have sufficiently proved their devotion and fidelity, and that they should now, as they were prepared to die for Ireland, prepare again to live for her".

Despite its success in that regard, the strike still had long-lasting negative effects on its nine survivors. Five of them suffered early deaths following related health problems, while others, such as Peter Crowley, experienced ill health for the rest of their lives, something described in painful detail in Crowley's Military Service Pension File.

== Later strikes ==
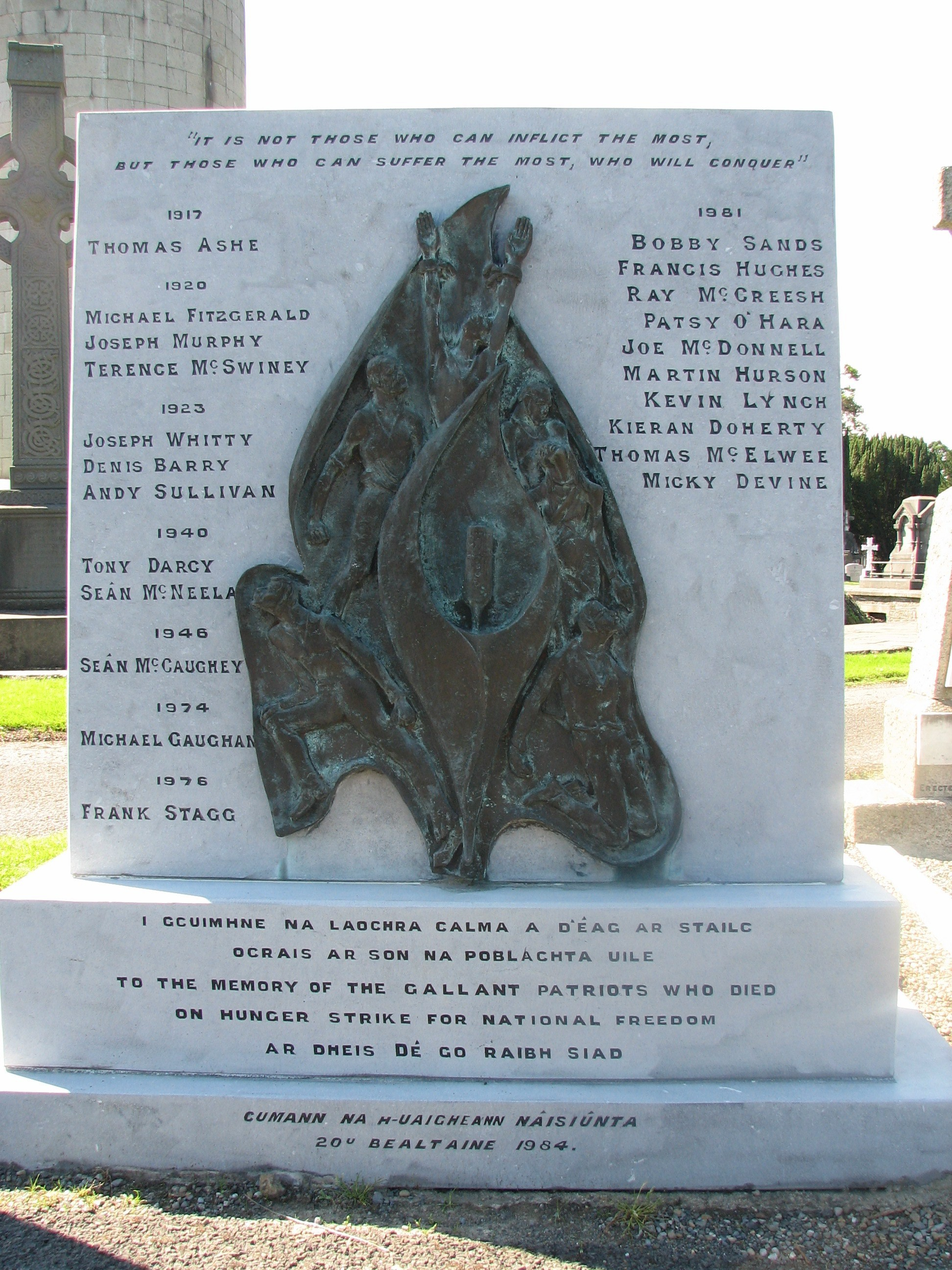
Hunger strikers memorial in Glasnevin Cemetery, Dublin

In October 1923, mass hunger strikes were undertaken by thousands of Irish republican prisoners protesting the continuation of their internment without trial following the Irish Civil War (see 1923 Irish hunger strikes). Three deaths occurred during this large scale hunger strike: Joseph Whitty (aged 19), Denny Barry and Andy O'Sullivan. After the 1923 hunger strikes, deaths occurred in five more Irish hunger strikes, including 10 death during the 1981 Irish hunger strike. In total, 22 Irish Republicans died on hunger strikes during the 20th century.
