= John Codd =

Irish British Army corporal (born 1912)

- Born: 1912 (age 113–114); Mountrath, County Laois, United Kingdom of Great Britain and Ireland
- Military career
- Allegiance: United Kingdom; Nazi Germany
- Branch: British Army; Abwehr; Sicherheitsdienst
- Unit: Royal Welsh Fusiliers
- Conflicts: World War II

John Codd (born 1912) was an Irish-born British Army corporal during World War II, who went on to serve in the German Intelligence service (Abwehr) and the Sicherheitsdienst, the foreign intelligence arm of the SS.

== Early life ==
Codd was born in Mountrath, County Laois in 1912. Although he had limited formal education, he was a gifted linguist and knew French, German, and Spanish. He emigrated to Canada in 1929, but moved to Britain in 1931 and enlisted in the Royal Welsh Fusiliers.

== World War II experience ==
=== 1940 capture ===
He served with this unit in the Far East until 1938 and was recalled to service in the Army in 1939. In 1940, he was dispatched with the British Expeditionary Force (BEF) to serve in France. He was wounded and captured by German forces.

After he had been treated in a German field hospital, he was transferred to Stalag III B at Lannesdorf and interned from December 1940 to January 1941. Stalag III B acted as a screening camp for another camp Stalag XX A (301) at Friesack, also known as "Friesack Camp".

=== Recruitment to German service ===
Friesack Camp was a special prisoner of war camp, where a number of British Army POWs of Irish nationality were congregated after expressing an interest in volunteering for service with the German military.

The training and selection by Abwehr II and the German Army occurred during 1940-43. The German military was attempting to raise a fighting force of Irish volunteers, along the lines of the World War I attempt to raise an Irish Brigade involving Roger Casement.

It was then hoped that suitable volunteers could engage in operations on the island of Ireland and in Great Britain. The selection process was administered by Abwehr II, a section of German Military Intelligence tasked with seeking groups in opposing nations who would assist the German war effort.

Helmut Clissmann, an NCO from the Abwehr II commando unit, the Brandenburgers, was involved in the selection of the candidates for training. Clissmann explained how the proposition of working for the German authorities was phrased to the POWs:

All Irishmen in prisoner-of-war camps were therefore invited to give their names with a view to going to a special camp which offered better conditions.

Codd was one of the ten men who were eventually selected for service with the Abwehr. He received sabotage, espionage, and radio equipment training. Upon his arrival in Friesack, Codd was visited by a Herr Bruckner, who made the initial approach about volunteering for service. He was promised that he would receive "freedom, money and an eventual return to Ireland."

Abwehr officials/agents, Dr. Jupp Hoven, Helmut Clissmann, and dual Abwehr/Foreign Ministry representative Kurt Haller also visited and spoke with Codd to win his allegiance. Following these approaches, Codd, along with another POW, Fusilier Frank Stringer, agreed to work for the Germans; and he was assigned an Abwehr handler or liaison: Harald Leichtweiss. To provide a cover for the transfer of Codd and Stringer to Berlin, a fight was staged in the camp canteen.

=== Mission assigned ===
Codd was assigned an Abwehr mission almost immediately after recruitment. The Abwehr war diary records for 6 October 1941 that Codd was to take part in Operation Innkeeper. ("Unternehmen Gastwirt" in German).

Hoven explains that on arrival in Berlin:

they were given instruction at the Abwehr training establishment on the Quenzgut, in the improvised manufacture of explosives, incendiaries, and such like. Also, in the district of a troop training area in western Germany, they were instructed in Abwehr radio procedure."

Codd, along with the other recruits, was courted by the Abwehr using a lavish expense account, fine wine and meals, a shared apartment block in Berlin, and meetings with officials in the Abwehr. While preparing for his mission, Codd was also provided with a salary of 400 Reichsmark and relative freedom around Berlin.

During his training, he was moved to Düsseldorf, with some suspicion that he had been neglecting his duties in favour of carousing. His training through to the summer of 1942, when the operational loss of Abwehr agents including those of Operation Pastorius changed Abwehr priorities; and a decision was taken to halt operations involving personnel recruited via Friesack Camp.

=== Prison ===
Around the time of the cancellation of Operation Innkeeper, Codd was arrested in Düsseldorf by the Gestapo and thrown in prison, after sending a letter to an Abwehr official demanding extra pay and privileges and threatening to terminate his agreement. Codd remained in prison, receiving visits from Frank Ryan, who was using the pseudonym "Mr. Maloney", and Kurt Haller. Due largely to Ryan's efforts, the Germans agreed to release Codd, although the Abwehr refused to employ him again.

=== Retraining with the SD ===
On his release, Codd was sent to see an SS-Hauptsturmführer Drescher at Berlin-Wilmersdorf, who informed him that he was once again scheduled for espionage work but that he had been released from Abwehr service and was now under the command of the Sicherheitsdienst (SD), the intelligence arm of the SS. Codd was given a new mission, this time to Northern Ireland, and was photographed for a passport issued under his new cover name "Jacob Collins".

Codd's previous Abwehr training was deemed insufficient, and he was given a two-week course in cryptography from a Frau Dr Heimpel. His training was supervised by SS-Hauptsturmführer Schultz, and he found himself posted to a ten-day demolition course at Hubertusalle, near Hallensee. This consisted of a series of classes and practical exercises in the use and manufacture of explosives and booby traps followed by a light- and heavy-weapons course at Berlin-Zehlendorf.

Rather than being sent on his mission immediately, Codd was tasked with acting as an interpreter for the SD and a group of twelve Arabs also undergoing training. Around this time Codd married a German woman named Irmgard Kensky from Cologne, whom he had met in March 1942.

On 23 April 1943, SS-Hauptsturmführer Giese took over from Schultz; and Codd's operational task was again reworked, with his assignment as a radio operator for a mission into Northern Ireland, although nothing appears to have happened regarding this. He remained at Lehnitz until May 1944; and, during his stay, he received training from an SD agent who was a Dutch national, Mr. Bakker. By this time, Codd was familiar with, and moving in, circles of the SD involving SS-Sturmbannführer Otto Skorzeny. At the end of May 1944, Codd was again transferred to a new SD espionage school located between The Hague and Scheveningen called "A-Schule West". At this school, Codd was introduced to other SD operatives, notably an agent calling himself "Koller".

Koller was, in fact, an American, William Colepaugh, who had previously engaged in minor missions for the Abwehr in the pre-war period in Latin America. Codd says that, at this point, Otto Skorzeny took a decision to pair him with "Koller" and send them both to America on an espionage mission. However, this was cancelled and, instead, Codd was dropped from the mission to be replaced by Erich Gimpel. This mission is assumed to be Operation Elster ("Magpie").

Students at the school were given training in demolition, sports, horse riding, swimming, radio sets, etc. At this time, Codd was asked if he wanted to join John Amery's collaborator unit the British Free Corps. He refused.

== Later life ==
Codd was never used as an agent of the Abwehr or the SD. The invasion of Normandy in June 1944 made further training for espionage agents unnecessary, as the fight had come home. However, Codd was again attached to the SD school at Lehnitz and along with the other personnel tried to avoid frontline service.

In May 1945, he and his wife successfully infiltrated a group of French refugees and made it safely to liberated France. Codd and his wife returned to Dublin after the war. Upon his return, he was arrested by Irish Military Intelligence (G2) and interrogated in detail about his experiences.

In 1948, unable to find a job in post-Emergency Dublin, Codd wrote a letter to the Secretary of the Irish Minister of Defence offering to demonstrate his ability in such areas as "small arms, grenades, patrolling". The secretary turned him down.

== See also ==
- British Free Corps
- John Amery
- The Emergency
- Plan W
- Irish Republican Army–Abwehr collaboration

=== Notable Abwehr operations involving Ireland ===
- Operation Green (Ireland)
- Operation Lobster
- Operation Lobster I
- Operation Seagull (Ireland)
- Operation Seagull I
- Operation Seagull II
- Operation Whale
- Operation Dove (Ireland)
- Operation Osprey
- Operation Sea Eagle
- Operation Innkeeper
