= Friesack Camp =

WW2 German POW camp for Irish Republicans

Stalag XX-A (301)
- Friesack, Brandenburg

Site information
- Type: Prisoner-of-war camp
- Controlled by: Nazi Germany

Location
- Germany, 1937
- Location within Germany
- Coordinates: 52.73°N 12.57°E

Site history
- In use: 1940–1943

Garrison information
- Occupants: Irish republicans

Friesack Camp or Camp Friesack was a special World War II prisoner of war camp where a group of Irishmen serving in the British Army volunteered for recruitment and selection by Abwehr II and the German Army. The camp was designated Stalag XX-A (301) and located in the Friesack area, Brandenburg region. The training and selection by Abwehr II and the German Army occurred during the period 1940–1943.

The camp was eventually dissolved, and its attendees were sent to fight on the Eastern Front, or interned in concentration camps after 1943.

== Immediate context ==
In the context of Irish Republicanism and German relations, there had been one previous attempt to raise a group of soldiers from nationalist-minded Irishmen serving in the British Army. These attempts took place during World War I in the POW camp at Limburg an der Lahn. However, despite the best efforts of Roger Casement and the Imperial German Army the attempt failed due to the fact that only fifty-two Irishmen volunteered for the duty in the "Irish Brigade".

During World War II the German intelligence service (Abwehr), and the German Foreign Ministry of Nazi Germany had developed an interest in operations on the island of Ireland as part of its operations against the British military. A number of abortive and some successful attempts were made to insert Abwehr agents into Ireland with a view to intelligence gathering and assisting the Irish Republican Army. That Germany might expect assistance from Irish nationalists in their fight against Britain is understandable. A common theme in Irish Republican thinking prior to, and during, World War I and World War II, is that:

"England's difficulty is Ireland's opportunity."

=== Genesis of the idea ===
Abwehr II was a section of German Intelligence which amongst its other duties was tasked with seeking out the disaffected and anti-authoritarian in opposing nations to give arms, assistance, or whatever means to increase disharmony. Following the successful 1940 campaign to defeat France, and the capture of British Army personnel throughout the period, a decision was taken within the Abwehr to sound out captured enemy soldiers in POW camps as to whether they would consider fighting for the German Army and/or German Intelligence. While it is likely that this was normal procedure for the Abwehr, the decision may have been influenced by Seán Russell, then IRA Chief of Staff, who had suggested a new "Irish Brigade" during his meetings with German Intelligence and the Foreign Ministry in Berlin during the summer of 1940. These attempts were made through the German Stalag network. The training and the induction of Irish-nationality POW's into German service was attempted at Friesack Camp. Attempts such as these were also tried amongst other POW groups with some success.

== Recruitment and selection ==
The best route to recruitment was considered to be inviting POWs to take on certain tasks which were considered to be equally in German and their own national interests. In the case of Irish nationals it was presumed that the cause of Irish reunification, an end to partition, and the absorption of Northern Ireland into the Irish Free State was a common cause which Germany could appear to support. An NCO from the Abwehr II commando unit, the Brandenburgers, Helmut Clissmann, was involved in selection of the candidates for training. Clissmann explained how the proposition of working for the German authorities was phrased to the POWs:

"All Irishmen in prisoner-of-war camps were therefore invited to give their names with a view to going to a special camp which offered better conditions."

It was believed that POWs familiar with the country could assist as saboteurs or agents, guiding German troops in the event of the invasions of Britain and Ireland (Operation Sea Lion and Operation Green respectively). Three entries in the Abwehr II war diary refer to the camp and its operation. The entries concern Operation Innkeeper, Operation Seagull I, and Operation Seagull II - all missions planned for either Britain or Ireland which involved attendees at Camp Friesack.

The German authorities were conscious that the possible recruits putting themselves forward for selection might have included moles, faux Irish nationalists, faux Irishmen with little connection to the island, and informers ordered by their superiors to report back on the details of the training. To guard against this, each candidate that showed an interest was interviewed by Clissmann and also by Frank Ryan, a former IRA member who been captured by Franco's forces during the Spanish Civil War and whose release from a 30-year prison sentence into the hands of the Abwehr had been organised by the Irish Government. However, Ryan's cooperation is disputed.

According to Clissmann, the initial December 1940 recruitment pool from the entire Stalag network was just over one hundred POWs, with each claiming to be of Irish nationality, and the number of officers was under five. The five officers made it clear that they would only fight in the event of an invasion of Ireland by British troops (this was being planned as Friesack recruitment took place, see Plan W). In Spring 1941, when Dr. Jupp Hoven, who was considered an expert on Irish affairs because of his time in the country before the war, arrived at Friesack, he found a recruiting base of eighty Irish POWs. This was eventually weeded down to a mere ten POWs who the Germans felt were sincere in their desire to fight for Germany. In order to keep their agreement to work for the Axis secret from their fellow prisoners, a prison break to spirit Codd and Stringer (see below) from the camp was arranged in mid-September 1941. and they were taken to Berlin to take up training by Abwehr II. In Berlin they were accommodated in a house. Just before Christmas 1941, Brady, Cushing, Murphy, O'Brien and Walsh (see below) also left Friesack and were taken to Berlin by the Germans.

== Training ==
Dr. Hoven explains that on arrival in Berlin,

"they were given instruction at the Abwehr training establishment on the Quenzgut, in the improvised manufacture of explosives, incendiaries and such like. Also, in the district of a troop training area in western Germany, they were instructed in Abwehr radio procedure."

The men involved in the training and orientation in Berlin were:

- Fusilier James Brady, Strokestown, County Roscommon - selected to take part in Operation Seagull II - subsequently volunteered for the Waffen-SS.
- Sergeant John Codd, Dublin, County Dublin - went on to serve in the German Intelligence service (Abwehr), who selected him to take part in Operation Innkeeper, and SS Intelligence.
- Private Crawley/Corporal Cawley, Bridge Street, Mountmellick, County Laois - released from Friesack in summer 1942 - sent to a farm at Klein Kiesow in or shortly after January 1943 - returned to Friesack in February 1943
- Private Thomas J. Cushing, Tipperary Town, County Tipperary - arrested in September 1942 - sent to Sachsenhausen concentration camp in February 1943 - author of 'Soldier for Hire'
- Private Johnstone - released from Friesack in summer 1942 - sent to a farm at Klein Kiesow in or shortly after January 1943 - returned to Friesack in February 1943
- Private Lee - released from Friesack in summer 1942 - sent to a farm at Klein Kiesow in or shortly after January 1943 - returned to Friesack in February 1943 - met Codd after the War
- Private William Murphy, Enniscorthy, County Wexford - arrested in September 1942 - sent to Sachsenhausen concentration camp in February 1943
- Private Patrick O'Brien, Nenagh, County Tipperary - arrested in September 1942 - sent to Sachsenhausen concentration camp in February 1943
- James Cromwell O'Neill, County Wexford - (a civilian captured on an interned freighter) and codenamed "Eisenbart" was sent on a mission to spy in Northern Ireland in summer 1942 although he turned himself in after reaching London.
- Private Frank Stringer, Gravelstown, County Meath - subsequently volunteered for the Waffen-SS.
- Private Strogen, Duleek, County Meath
- Private Andrew Walsh, Fethard, County Tipperary - selected to take part in Operation Seagull I - arrested in September 1942 - sent to Sachsenhausen concentration camp in February 1943

Other than the "suspect" Irish nationals known to have been at Friesack there was also:

- William Sargent (or Sergeant) from Kilmallock, County Limerick,
- John Kenny
- Liam Mullally and Dan Reeves from Dublin who both worked for the Deutscher Fichte-Bund.

== Other "Suspect" Irish nationals in Germany ==
There were other Irish living or working in Germany at the time—these were people entirely unconnected to the regime, its activities, or involved in military/intelligence matters. For one reason or another they found themselves in the country during World War II either through marriage to German citizens or soldiers, were just drifting, or were internees from civilian ships caught in Germany at the outbreak of war. Some, however, did become involved in various activities through sheer circumstance.

Irish Intelligence (G2) attempted to keep track of these individuals, who numbered around eighty-five in total. Of particular interest to G2 were:

- Maura Lydon, from Gortmore, County Mayo, after she mentioned in a letter home that she was broadcasting "for Germany calling Ireland". This information appeared to confirm an unknown voice heard on the Irland-Redaktion transmissions.
- Peggy Kearny, who had been living on Jersey.
- Ella Kavanagh and Maureen Petrie, who were both put on the "suspect list" when those names were put on German radio broadcasts to Ireland, although it was later assumed that the names used had been pseudonyms for other broadcasters.
- Edward Bowlby, who was broadcasting propaganda to Britain.
- John McCarthy from County Cork, who was reported to be working for the Hansa Line ("DDG Hansa"), assigned to the merchant ship SS Treuenfels.
- Another John McCarthy from Bandon, County Cork.

=== Suspected/known civilian sympathisers in Germany ===
- Francis Stuart, who conducted radio broadcasts for various propaganda arms of the Reich.
- William Joseph Murphy from Bessbrook, County Armagh, who worked for the Berlitz language school (travelling on a British passport), had met William Joyce and was given a list of information that the Abwehr wanted from Northern Ireland including factories supplying the British war effort, but who never conducted any missions and made his way to American lines in Luxembourg in September 1944.
- John and Henry Freeman (the Freeman brothers), who appear to have been freelance recruitment agents for the Abwehr, specialising in the recruitment of English speakers.
- Owen Corr, from Rush, County Dublin, whose merchant ship, the MV Silverfix, was sunk by German E-boats. On his capture he was interned in Marlag und Milag Nord (the internment camp for "enemy" merchant sailors) near Bremen. On 27 January 1943 he was released for civilian work at the Bremen Labour Office. His name was given to the Abwehr agent Joseph Andrews, the would-be successor to Hermann Görtz, as a character reference. He is thought by G2 to have died during the war.
- British Intelligence also had an interest in another attendee at Milag Nord, Patrick Joseph Dillon, who was said to be working for the Sicherheitsdienst (SS intelligence agency).
- Thomas Gunning, former secretary to Blueshirt leader Eoin O'Duffy, was also a "suspect", having remained in Spain after the rest of the Irish Brigade fighting for Francisco Franco departed under a cloud of recrimination in 1937. Gunning worked as a newspaper correspondent in Spain for a short time, then made his way to Berlin where he worked for the Ministry of Propaganda until his death in 1940.

== Notable Abwehr operations involving Ireland ==
- Operation Green (Ireland)
- Operation Lobster
- Operation Lobster I
- Operation Seagull (Ireland)
- Operation Seagull I
- Operation Seagull II
- Operation Whale
- Operation Dove (Ireland)
- Operation Osprey
- Operation Sea Eagle
- Operation Mainau
- Operation Innkeeper

== See also ==
- List of prisoner-of-war camps in Germany
- The Emergency
- Plan W
- British Free Corps
- John Amery
- Irish Republican Army – Abwehr collaboration in World War II
