= Operation Seagull (Ireland) =

Operation Seagull ("Unternehmen Möwe" or "Seemöwe" in German) was an Abwehr II/Brandenburger Regiment-sanctioned mission launched in September 1940. The object of the mission was to infiltrate the UK in preparation for Operation Sea Lion (Unternehmen Seelöwe in German).

== Military context ==
Operation Seagull was planned in connection with Abwehr's remit of intelligence gathering for Operation Sea Lion. Despite being planned and launched, the mission was aborted midway during the sea crossing to Ireland.

At the time of Seagull's conception, Abwehr chief Wilhelm Canaris had already issued orders that regional Abwehr stations known as "Ast's" (see Abwehr) were not to attempt to infiltrate into Britain via Ireland for the foreseeable future, due to the dismal failure of Operation Lobster I ("Unternehmen Hummer" in German) in July 1940. However, Seagull was directed by Army Group Northern France/Belgium via the Brandenburger Regiment attached to Abwehr II anyway.

== Agents involved ==
Christian Nissen aka "Hein Mück" had already taken part in Operation Lobster I. His orders were to transport an NCO from the Brandenburgers, Helmut Clissmann, and one Abwehr I. radio operator to the southern coast of Ireland to carry out their mission. The vessel chosen was the "Anni Braz-Bihen". Clissmann was stationed at Westende, Belgium in readiness for the operation. Nissen received his orders from his direct superior in the Regiment, Captain Hollman.

Clissmann's mission had two parts. First, he and the radio operator were to be landed by boat in the southern region of Ireland. Once landed, the two agents were to establish contact with the IRA. After successful contact, Clissmann was to use the help of the IRA to travel to Britain. Once in Britain Clissmann was to seek out suitable guides to help a possible invading force of Brandenburger troops to the Dover area. If travelling to Britain proved impossible, Clissmann was to enlist the help of the IRA in searching within Ireland for guides to the Dover area. In the event of the agents being forced to remain in Ireland, they were to make contact with Captain Hermann Görtz through the German Legation in Dublin.

Unfortunately for the Abwehr agents, the entire mission had to be aborted even before reaching the Irish coast. During the seacrossing from France a number of things went wrong; the bilge pump on the boat failed, the Danish mechanic became unconscious after an accident, and the vessel was buffeted by a heavy storm for three days. These events forced Nissen to head back to Brest Bay, France.

== Involvement of the IRA ==
There was no involvement or prior knowledge of Operation Seagull by the IRA in Ireland, or by agents of the IRA working with Nazi Germany at the time. The mission brief provided by Abwehr II staff to the agents, namely to "establish contact with the IRA," provides an insight into the lack of understanding they had of the IRA's strength and presence in Ireland at the time, more than anything that may have come of the plan.

== Further information and sources ==
- Mark M. Hull, Irish Secrets. German Espionage in Wartime Ireland 1939-1945, 2003, ISBN 978-0-7165-2756-5

== Notable Abwehr operations involving Ireland ==
- Operation Lobster
- Operation Lobster I
- Operation Seagull I
- Operation Seagull II
- Operation Whale
- Operation Dove (Ireland)
- Operation Osprey
- Operation Sea Eagle
- Plan Kathleen
- Operation Mainau
- Operation Innkeeper

== See also ==
- Operation Green (Ireland)
- Irish Republican Army–Abwehr collaboration in World War II
