= Plan Kathleen =

Unrealised plan by Nazi Germany to invade Northern Ireland

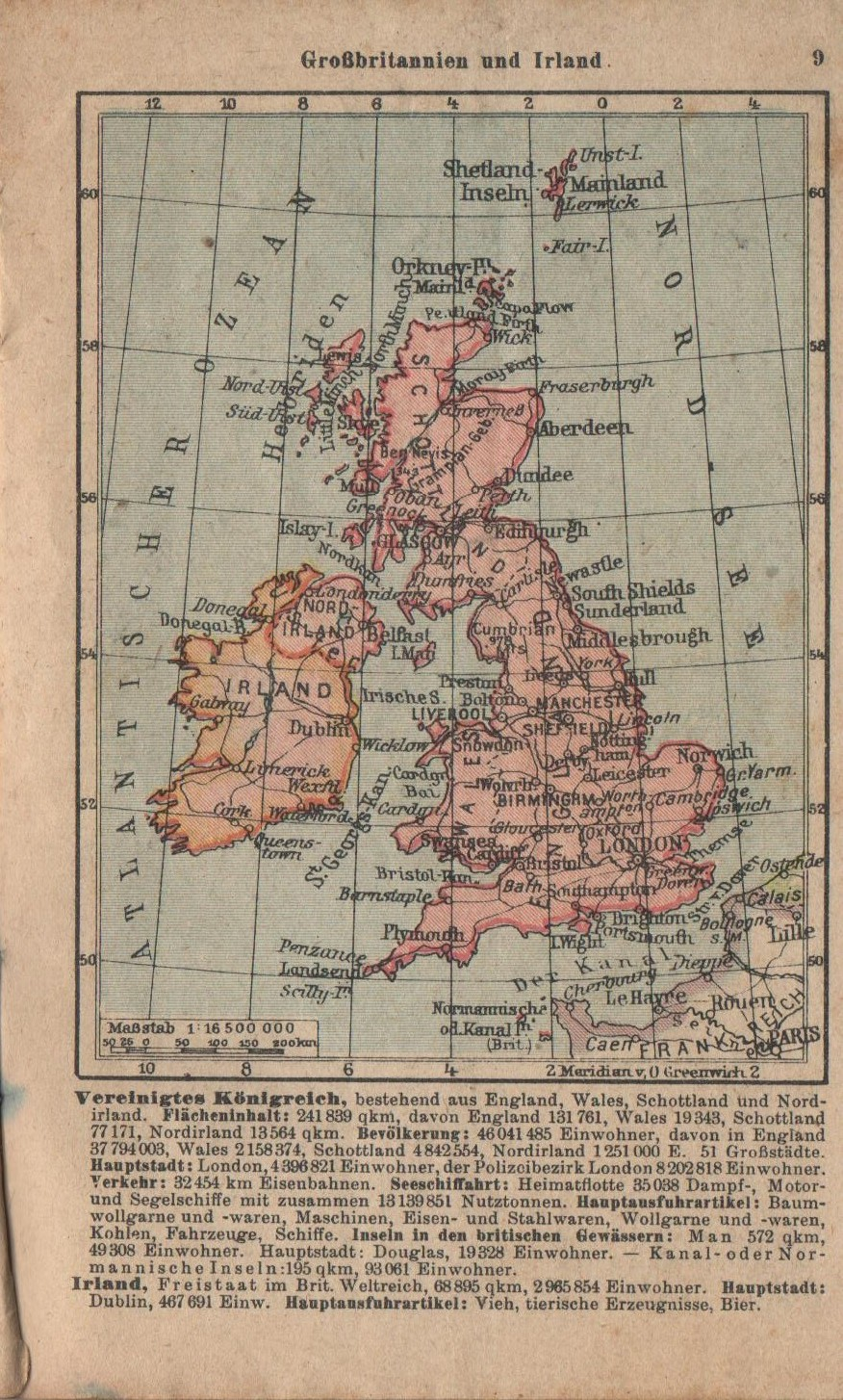
Great Britain and Ireland on a 1939/40 German map

Plan Kathleen, sometimes referred to as the Artus Plan, was a military plan for the invasion of Northern Ireland by Nazi Germany, sanctioned in 1940 by Stephen Hayes, Acting Irish Republican Army (IRA) Chief of Staff.

Plan Kathleen is distinct from Operation Green, the German military plan to invade Ireland, also drawn up in 1940.

== Immediate context ==
Kathleen took place in the context of then IRA chief of staff, Seán Russell, being incommunicado in the United States as he pursued the propaganda arm of the S-Plan. Russell was attempting to arrange passage to Berlin (see Operation Dove), having left Stephen Hayes as Acting Chief of Staff back in Ireland.

While Russell's movements were unknown to Hayes, he sanctioned the drawing up an invasion plan to end partition and reunify the island of Ireland. The plan was written by an IRA volunteer called Liam Gaynor.

Gaynor created the plan in early 1940, sometime before it was decided to send the plan to Nazi Germany via courier. Hayes had a couple of reasons for doing this; he wanted German assistance for IRA operations in Ireland, and he wanted to re-establish the IRA link with German Intelligence (Abwehr) to secure arms and money.

The courier for transporting the plan to Germany was a Dublin businessman Stephen Carroll Held whose step-father Michael Held had German-Swiss heritage.

Held left for Germany and arrived on 20 April 1940. His first call was to the door of the first Abwehr contact in Ireland, Oscar Pfaus. Pfaus then took Held to Berlin to meet with Abwehr Section-Leader Kurt Haller. Held was instructed to produce a means of identification previously agreed upon that would prove that he was an emissary sent by the IRA. During this first meeting, he did not meet Hermann Görtz, an Abwehr agent who was preparing to leave for Ireland, but he was introduced to him later. It is thought that Held met Görtz on a later occasion in Frankfurt in 1940.

Due to his nervousness, the Abwehr were suspicious and they found the plan he carried extremely amateurish.

His mission complete (delivering the plan and an invitation from Hayes for a German officer to be sent to Ireland), Held returned to Ireland two days later. The Abwehr II war diary briefly records the entire incident beginning 20 April 1940:

"A personal emissary of the chief Irish agent (Jim (Seamus) O'Donovan) has arrived in Germany."

Then on 24 April:

"The representative sent from Ireland to Germany on behalf of Abwehr II's chief Irish agent departed according to plan on April 23 for Belgium by secret route."

== Details of Plan Kathleen ==
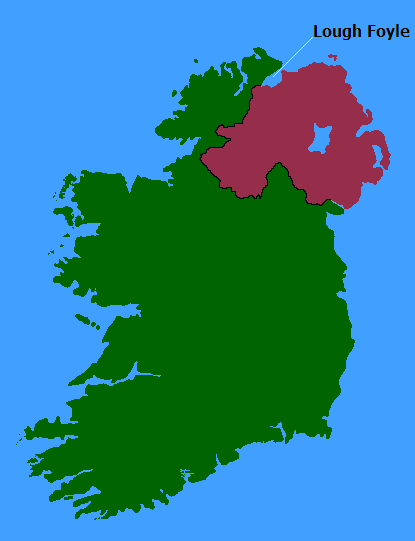
Plan Kathleen called for an invasion via Lough Foyle to the city of Derry.

According to Görtz, Kathleen consisted of a map, on which was the suggestion of a German landing similar to that at Narvik, in the vicinity of Derry — an amphibious assault. The aim of the plan was the conquest of Northern Ireland via a simultaneous IRA insurgency and use of German forces. Other places German soldiers would be landed include Coleraine, Larne and Sligo. The IRA were to be concentrated in County Leitrim, on the border facing Lough Erne and Upper Lough Erne awaiting the arrival of German forces in Northern Ireland.

However, the IRA plan gave no thought to how German troops were to be brought to Derry, how control of the sea approaches was to be obtained or where and how the coast of Northern Ireland was fortified. Görtz described the plan at the time and its limitations thus: "The plan was therefore completely useless. It nearly broke my heart, since it came from the IRA Chief of Staff."

Hull in Irish Secrets describes the plan so:

The plan envisaged a landing in the neighbourhood of Derry (in the manner of Narvik Operation Weserübung) and a successful conquest of Ulster with assistance from the IRA. The IRA planned a ground offensive beginning in County Leitrim with a front on the Lower and Upper Lough Erne which would, somehow, lead to the destruction of all British forces in Northern Ireland. The bait for the Germans was supposed to be the change of neutralising the RAF's use of Lough Erne as a tactical base against the U-boat fleet. The plan called for the deployment of 50,000 German troops."

It is accepted that the plan was poorly constructed and not treated with any seriousness by the Abwehr or German Foreign Ministry, although at this stage they did not yet recognise the IRA as "hopelessly immature". In so much as the plan was considered, it was considered a measure of IRA intent — willingness to assist. It is not known whether any serious planning was done around Kathleen, although the plan appears to have been widened in scope, maybe by Görtz, or perhaps Kurt Student, who presented a similar plan to Hitler in January 1941, to include parachute drops of German troops around Divis Mountain and Lisburn in combination with the amphibious assault on Lough Swilly and Magilligan Point.

== Aftermath of Kathleen ==
Plan Kathleen was sent to Germany in April 1940, and arrived around two weeks before Görtz was to parachute into Ireland as part of Operation Mainau on 5 May. Before his departure, Görtz was instructed to begin contact with the IRA, assess the strength of the IRA and the feasibility of the plan. He did discuss the plan and strength of the IRA with Hayes upon his arrival in Ireland.

By the time of these discussions, Russell was still alive, he had arrived in Berlin the day Görtz left although they did not speak together.

The discussions Görtz had with Hayes were entirely unproductive. Hayes and Görtz's had begun their negotiations on 17 May, meeting in the home of Stephen Held. Prior to this Görtz had probably already met with Seamus O'Donovan who had briefed him on the state of the IRA. At this meeting Hayes listed the strength of the IRA, which Görtz reported as "5000 sworn in members, of whom 1500 [are in] Northern Ireland. Hayes counts on a further 10,000 Northern Irish and 15,000 Southern Irish in the case of an armed revolt in Northern Ireland". However, Görtz expressed disappointment with Hayes:

"I do not think it is necessary for me to describe the disappointment which I felt when I met Stephen Hayes, although I had already been warned. I expected someone like Léon Degrelle [leader of the Belgian Rexists] or like the leaders of the Breton independence movement, or the Ukrainian leaders with whom I had become acquainted in Berlin. Hayes was an ex-footballer. At first he showed himself as a man of good personal qualities but that is not enough for the leader of nationalist extremists. Later his character deteriorated. I think from alcohol and fear."

At this meeting, Görtz claims that he directed Hayes to cease operations in Éire and instead concentrate operations on Northern Ireland. Görtz reports that Hayes said he would issue orders to that effect. Hayes is also reported to have said that the Irish Government had made contact with him via a priest, "Father O'Hara", with a view to incorporating the IRA within the Irish Defence Forces.

Görtz reports that Kathleen was discussed:

"We discussed the plan of a German invasion of Ulster on the basis of ′Plan Kathleen′ which Held had brought to Germany. I did not tell Hayes what I really thought about the plan but used the discussion about it only as a pretext to learn something about the real strength and state of readiness of the IRA. I said that the plan was the subject of a lively discussion in Germany but that one needed more military intelligence about Ulster before the plan could be executed. Thereupon Hayes asked what sort of information was needed.... Hayes then told me that the IRA had no weapons for any sort of major action. When I learnt of all that was needed in the way of weapons, I wondered exactly what was the military value of the IRA. I told Hayes flatly that the landing of a consignment of arms was just as impossible on the Ulster coast as on that of Éire. The one possibility was delivery on the high seas and that would only be feasible for small quantities. Hayes jumped at this idea. I immediately regretted having spoken about this at all because my remark led to wild and fantastic IRA discussions as to which island could be used for U-boat replenishment and which impossible bogs and mountains could be used as airfields."

Görtz was to say later:

"We always discussed the same things. In Ulster nothing was achieved on IRA initiative, in Éire the order to discontinue activities was not strictly obeyed."

Görtz claims that after this meeting he sat down and worked out the details of shipping and landing arms in Ireland.

== Capture of the Plan ==
On 22 May 1940, Held′s house was raided and equipment brought by Görtz to Ireland including his parachute and Plan Kathleen were seized. The Garda waited for Held to arrive at the house and arrested him.

They also found, in Görtz′s room, a typewriter and a file that contained military details about Irish harbours, airfields, bridges, roads, landing places, and the distribution of Irish Defence Forces. Around the same time, the wife of Francis Stuart, Iseult Stuart (daughter of Maud Gonne) was arrested on suspicion of also harbouring "Heinrich Brandy", the name Görtz was travelling under.

Plan Kathleen was blown, and the Irish authorities immediately sent it to MI5 in London who sent it to the Royal Ulster Constabulary (RUC) in Belfast. The details of the plan were to form the nucleus of joint Irish and British wargaming the following year, under the auspices of Plan W — the combined response to a German invasion.

Hempel would try to negate the fear generated within the Irish political establishment by the discovery of Plan Kathleen. He was instructed to do this by underscoring German offers of military assistance should Britain invade Éire.

== The Kurt Student Plan 1941 ==
Plan Kathleen, or a widened variant of the plan to take over Northern Ireland appears to have surfaced again in Nazi Germany during January 1941. During an audience with Hitler, General Kurt Student, commander of the German 11th Airborne Corps, discussed a plan to take over Northern Ireland and leave the territory of Éire free from, and unoccupied by, German troops.

The discussions took place at the Obersalzberg on New Year's Day where Student was recovering from wounds received during the invasion of Holland. At this point, Hitler was still considering an invasion of Britain and it was within this context that Student suggested a diversionary paratrooper attack on Northern Ireland, to coincide with German landings on the south coast of England. Student suggested a plan whereby dummies dressed as paratroopers would also be dropped to confuse the enemy. According to Student:

"...an even longer discussion followed on the question of the position of the Irish Free State. Hitler stated: 'Éire's neutrality must be respected. A neutral Irish Free State is of greater value to us than a hostile Ireland. We must be glad that Ireland has remained neutral up to the present. But we could not avoid trespassing on a small scale, through units losing their way by emergency landings at night, by dropping in the wrong area.'"

Student suggested the best date for the operation would be in April, on the 25th anniversary of the Easter 1916 Rising. His plan was to drop 20,000 paratroopers and 12,000 airborne troops by night on two areas of Northern Ireland. The first and larger force would land in the triangle between the northern half of Lough Neagh and Divis Mountain above Belfast, capturing the RAF fields at Aldergrove, Langford Lodge and Nutts Corner. At the same time, a second force of paratroopers would be dropped near Lisburn to destroy the planes on the Long Kesh airfield and cut road and rail links between Belfast and the south. Student's dummies would meanwhile be dropped over the Mourne and Sperrin Mountains to add to the confusion. At daybreak, Luftwaffe fighter squadrons would then fly in from Brittany and land on the captured airfields.

Student claimed after the end of World War II that he thought the first part of the operation would have been a success, but if the landings in Britain had gone badly, he and his men would have fought through to the territory of Éire and asked to be interned rather than be captured by the British Army. Despite this sentiment, Student was unaware of the cooperation between Dublin and London around Plan W, and most likely any invasion of German forces would have triggered an invasion by the British. Hitler made no decision on the matter and Student was told the next day by Reichsmarschall Hermann Göring:

"Do not trouble yourself needlessly about Ulster [Northern Ireland]. The Führer does not want to invade Great Britain. From now on Gibraltar will be the main task for you."

== Notable Abwehr operations involving Ireland ==
- Operation Green (Ireland)
- Operation Lobster
- Operation Lobster I
- Operation Seagull (Ireland)
- Operation Seagull I
- Operation Seagull II
- Operation Whale
- Operation Dove (Ireland)
- Operation Osprey
- Operation Sea Eagle
- Operation Mainau
- Operation Innkeeper

== See also ==
- The Emergency
- Plan W
- Irish Republican Army – Abwehr collaboration in World War II – Main article on IRA Nazi links
