= Operation Osprey =

World War II German plan

Operation Osprey ("Unternehmen Fischadler" in German) was a plan conceived by the German Foreign Ministry and Abwehr II. mid-1942. The plan was an enlargement of Operation Whale ("Unternehmen Wal" in German). Planning took place in the context of American troops landing in Northern Ireland 26 January 1942, and Hitler's immediate fears surrounding this.

== Figures and groups involved ==
Planning for Osprey began after conversations between German Foreign Minister Joachim von Ribbentrop and Führer Adolf Hitler in the weeks following the arrival of a contingent of 4,508 US troops and engineers in Belfast commanded by Major-General Russell P. Hartle, the Commanding General of the 34th Division. The German command feared that these forces could set up bases in neutral Ireland. US forces had already compromised the neutrality of both Iceland and Greenland the previous year and it was known by the Germans that pressure had been placed on Éamon de Valera to cede the port in Cobh, and/or side with the British in World War II. German forces had already considered the occupation of Ireland in "Plan Green", but, with the German failure during the Battle of Britain, the launching of Green alongside Operation Sea Lion was still a distant prospect.

Osprey envisioned the use of volunteer commando troops trained in sabotage and British weaponry to go to Ireland in the event of an American invasion and train "Irish partisans", volunteers of the Irish Republican Army (IRA), and any Irish Army units resisting the invasion. Abwehr II. was to have only technical input into the planning and training of this new unit; the Foreign Ministry was to dominate via the Reich's Security Headquarters (RSHA) and have overall control.

== Mission plan and training ==
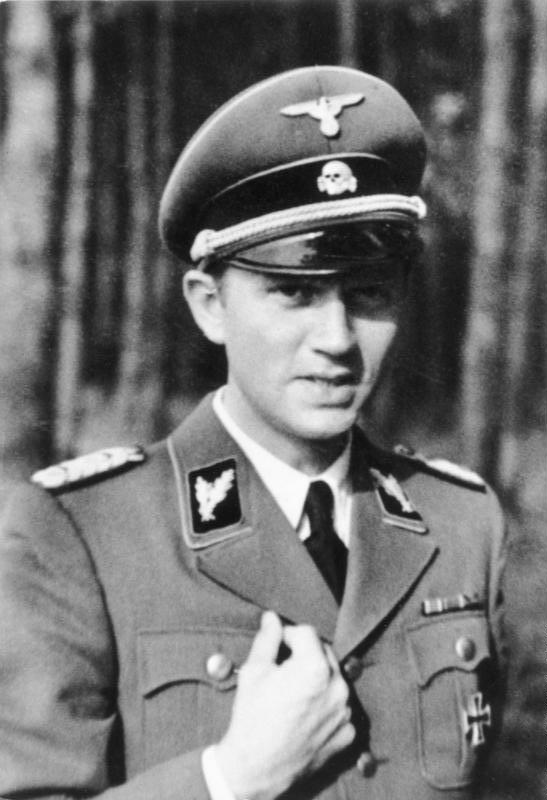
Walter Schellenberg as an SS-Oberführer

The mission plan and training schedule for Osprey was drawn up by Director of Amt VI, Walther Schellenberg, who held his brief with the Foreign Political Information Service.

Training took place at the Totenkopf Barracks in Berlin-Oranienburg and consisted of the selection of around 100 volunteers from various SS troop sections. The unit was designated Sonder Lehrgang Oranienburg and consisted of seventy NCOs and thirty private soldiers under the command of Hauptsturmführer Pieter Van Vessem (reportedly a Dutch national). Brandenburg regiment NCO Helmut Clissmann was to test the suitability of these volunteers against Abwehr set benchmarks of foreign language skills and cultural awareness of Ireland/Britain. Each volunteer was given English language training, and British weaponry, sabotage, and explosives training. Clissmann did believe that on the whole the unit would be able to fulfil its mission of providing close tactical support and training for any parties resisting an American invasion.

The Waffen-SS unit was to be inserted into Ireland by parachute using a Focke-Wulf Fw 200 'Condor' once the American invasion began. In addition, as part of Osprey, consideration was given to using selected regular 'Brandenburgers' and two captured Irish Prisoners of War recruited from Friesack Camp. The unit and plan was not put to the test in Ireland because the feared American invasion of Éire territory did not occur.

Despite being cancelled this mission did mark the first entrance of the SS's intelligence service, the Sicherheitsdienst (SD) into Irish affairs.

== Involvement of the IRA ==
There was no involvement or prior knowledge of Operation Osprey by the IRA in Ireland, although it is almost certain that Frank Ryan, an ex-IRA volunteer captured by Franco's forces and handed over to the Abwehr, was aware of the mission. His input is thought to have been minimal as ill health on his part had prevented him from taking part in Operation Whale – the precursor to Osprey.

== Abwehr operations involving Ireland ==
- Operation Green (Ireland)
- Operation Lobster
- Operation Lobster I
- Operation Seagull (Ireland)
- Operation Seagull I
- Operation Seagull II
- Operation Whale
- Operation Dove (Ireland)
- Operation Sea Eagle
- Plan Kathleen
- Operation Mainau
- Operation Innkeeper

== See also ==
- The Emergency (Ireland)
- Plan W
- Oskar Metzke
- IRA Abwehr World War II – Main article on IRA Nazi links
