= Irish Republican Army–Abwehr collaboration =

Attempts by the IRA and Nazi Germany to coordinate against the UK

The Irish Republican Army (IRA), a paramilitary group seeking to remove Northern Ireland from the United Kingdom and unify Ireland, shared intelligence with the Abwehr, the military intelligence service of Nazi Germany, during the Second World War.

== Context ==
The conquest of Ireland was not a strategic goal for Nazi Germany before or during World War II. A plan existed for a potential invasion of Ireland, Operation Green, but it was more a diversionary tactic than an actual plot to take over the country.

What Nazi Germany hoped was to see Ireland remain neutral in the conflict.

When German attempts to gain air superiority over Great Britain as part of the Battle of Britain, seen as a potential precursor to Operation Sea Lion, were repulsed, Ireland largely ceased to be of much interest.

IRA-Abwehr involvement throughout the period can be broken up into three phases:

- Coordination missions with the IRA preceding the French campaign,
- Military missions directed against Britain for the purposes of gathering technical and weather data,
- Political missions against Britain undertaken later in the war, when the threat of direct German action against Britain had receded.

Each phase had similar characteristics: a lack of planning, and a lack of capabilities of all the organisations concerned. German efforts to cultivate a working relationship with the IRA formed the basis for two wartime missions; that of Ernst Weber-Drohl, and that of Hermann Görtz, but the Abwehr later chose to rely on support mechanisms exclusive of the IRA. Neither strategy proved viable and the entire process was one disaster after another. The missions of the first phase are covered in detail below, followed by a list of missions covering the two remaining phases.

== 1937–1939: the first IRA contacts ==
The Abwehr had German agents in Ireland at this point. Joseph Hoven was an anthropology student who spent much of 1938 and 1939 in Northern Ireland and the province of Connacht. Hoven had befriended Tom Barry, an IRA member who had fought during the Anglo-Irish War and was still active within the organisation. They met frequently with a view to fostering links between the IRA and Germany.

At this time Barry had taken up the position of IRA Chief of Staff and it was within this capacity that he visited Germany in 1937 accompanied by Hoven, with a view to developing IRA/German relations.

Upon his return to Ireland, Barry presented his findings to the IRA General Army Convention (GAC) during April 1938 in the guise of the "Barry Plan" – a campaign focused on targets in the border region of Northern Ireland. This plan was rejected by the GAC in favour of a competing plan to solely attack targets in Britain – the S-Plan sanctioned by Seán Russell.

Seán MacBride, the son of John MacBride and Barry's Director of Intelligence, is also known to have handled a contact with an ex-German Army officer named Bismarck, who was in Ireland attempting to sell armoured cars to the Irish Army in 1937. The Intelligence director for the Dublin Brigade of the IRA, Con Lehane is also said to have helped MacBride with handling proposals about the IRA being absorbed into the Irish Military.

== 1939–1940 ==
In December 1938, the Abwehr II. Ast., located at Knochenhauerstraße, Hamburg, took an English-speaking agent on loan from the English section of the Deutscher Fichte-Bund headquarters (HQ) in Hamburg. This agent was Oscar C. Pfaus. Around this time, the IRA, independently of German Intelligence, began a series of attacks on targets in Britain following a declaration of war on the British State. Pfaus was familiarised with media reports of this campaign and given a mission:

"to seek out the IRA leadership; make contact; ask if they would be interested in cooperation with Germany; and, if so, to send a liaison man to Germany to discuss specific plans and future co-ordination."

Pfaus's mission did not include a military component and he was not given authorisation to discuss items of an intelligence nature. In preparation for his mission, Pfaus was to later meet with the officer in charge of Office 1 West, Abwehr II HQ- Hauptmann Friedrich Carl Marwede, codenamed "Dr. Pfalzgraf". On reaching Ireland, the contact Pfaus had been given was a former member of the IRA's 3rd Battalion, Liam Walsh, who was a friend and confidant of Eoin O'Duffy, and then employed at the Italian Legation. Pfaus was unaware at the time of the meeting that the fascist Blueshirts had been ideologically hostile to the IRA, but did secure from Walsh a meeting with an IRA contact. A meeting between Pfaus and IRA representatives took place on 13 February 1939. Pfaus reported that those included in the meeting were Moss Twomey, the new CS. Sean Russell, and Seamus (Jim) O'Donovan. Pfaus found himself unable or unauthorized to answer all the questions of the IRA, so an arrangement to send an IRA representative to Germany for substantive talks was made. Following this meeting, Russell decided to send O'Donovan, within one week, as the IRA's representative. Bowyer Bell puts it so:

"Russell, elated by the prospect of German arms, ammunition, and money to supplement the thin stream of Clan na Gael aid, decided to entrust the mission to Seamus O'Donovan."

The figures involved included Eduard Hempel and "three members of the Nazi party" in Dublin. The meeting took place in County Donegal and General Eoin O'Duffy, Seamus Burke, and Theodor Kordt (attached to the German embassy in London) were reportedly responsible for making the arrangements. Another meeting reportedly took place in Louisburgh, County Mayo between Hempel, O'Duffy, and members of the IRA in August 1939.

== Seamus O'Donovan ==
Seamus O'Donovan, a German speaker, made three trips to Germany in 1939. The first meeting in February saw O'Donovan conduct discussions with the head of Office 1 West, Abwehr HQ – Friedrich Carl Marwede, codenamed "Dr. Pfalzgraf".

O'Donovan and Marwede discussed the appropriate wartime role of the IRA as it concerned the German Government. The Germans were adamant they could not supply immediate help for the IRA in its S-Plan campaign in Britain. Other areas of concern for the Germans were that they were unsure how the IRA intended to attack targets in Northern Ireland and how to supply arms to the group. O'Donovan returned to Ireland with these concerns with after being given the codename "V-Held" (Agent Hero in German). He returned to Germany on 26 April 1939 for more meetings with Marwede, this time to discuss radio contact, a courier route for messages and armaments, and the location of a safe house in London for use in the courier route. By the time O'Donovan returned to Ireland on 15 May, Russell had left for the United States as part of the propaganda arm of the S-Plan and installed Stephen Hayes as Acting CS. The final meeting O'Donovan took part in was in August 1939 when he brought his wife with him. This series of meetings was also attended by Joseph McGarrity, the leader of Clan na Gael and Monty Barry, his wife and sister of the late Kevin Barry. According to O'Donovan's diaries, he was escorted to the meetings by a representative of the German Foreign Ministry. The topics under discussion were:

1. the possibility of reviving the English campaign in the event of war,
2. the IRA capabilities in England, Northern Ireland, and Ireland,
3. the policies, intentions and probable reactions of the Dublin government to any outbreak of hostilities between Nazi Germany and Britain,
4. the standard of IRA capabilities and their exact arms requirements.

O'Donovan notes in his diary that his hosts told him that there would be a war "probably within one week". A few days later, on 1 September 1939, Germany invaded Poland.

== Communication problems ==
The radio transmitter that was supplied to the IRA by Joseph McGarrity proved to lack the range to reach Germany, and the IRA began using it for propaganda broadcasts- leading to its swift capture by the Irish authorities on 29 December 1939. During its capture, they also found evidence of attempts at coded transmissions to Nazi Germany. Though the transmitter had been captured, O'Donovan, up to his internment in September 1941, was to continue monitoring and transcribing coded broadcasts from Germany. In many cases, the reception was weak or blocked. The existing logs show an almost continuous period of monitoring from January through to September 1940.

- 30/12/39 – Owing to illness and lack of decision, no reception.
- 24/01/40 – Conditions bad.
- 14/02/40 – Morse receiver did not turn up. Abandoned.
- 09/03/40 – Almost perfect except for what came in like jamming in each of three repeats. However reconstructed blanks ok.
- 13/03/40 – Untrained Morse man. Says got RVK and a number but no message.

== Military and political mission phases ==
By that stage of events, each IRA Chief of Staff., from 1937 onwards, had been involved in liaisons with the Germans to one degree or another. Those liaisons were to continue into the tenure of Stephen Hayes and his overture to Nazi Germany via "Plan Kathleen" in 1940. Once Hayes was exposed as a traitor to the IRA, there was a power shift within the organisation, which led to the futile Northern Campaign in 1942. The IRA's Northern Command was briefed on the previous liaisons with the Germans but they appear not to have grasped how fragile and scant they were. That power shift, the restrictions imposed on the IRA during "The Emergency", and the change in fortunes for the German forces in World War II, effectively ended the liaison between the IRA and Abwehr. The Abwehr kept attempting to conduct operations in Ireland, but the majority of those operations were stillborn and never took place, or were total fiascos. However, those attempts were made without the knowledge of the IRA. It was demoralised and militarily moribund, and even the ability to gather fruitful intelligence was gone.

The contacts prior to 1940 had expressed an intent by the IRA to assist in the German campaign against Britain. From the IRA's point of view, that was a means to a united Ireland – they had no love for the policies of Éamon de Valera, Winston Churchill, Adolf Hitler, or Joseph Stalin. The 1938 takeover by Russell, and a reaffirmation of the "Second Dáil mentality" with his succession, placed the organisation on a path from which it viewed its only recourse as "violent struggle against the forces of foreign occupation". The IRA did wish to see the defeat of Britain by Germany, perceiving that it would lead to an immediate end of British control over Northern Ireland. The Abwehr, as it did in other nations, made much of encouraging that state of mind within the IRA. That included attempts, via German agents, to keep alive the tenuous links, formed mostly by O'Donovan.

What solidified that as German policy was the 1940 IRA arms raid on the Magazine Fort, in Dublin. The event gave an entirely misleading positive impression to the Nazi authorities about the IRA's capabilities. Another factor was the failure of the incompetent German agent, Hermann Görtz, to relay back comprehensive details on his meeting with IRA CS, Stephen Hayes, after discussing Plan Kathleen. Due to those factors, the German authorities had to learn the hard way, through failed missions, that the IRA at that point in time was far less militarily capable than they had hoped.

== See also ==
=== German agents ===
- Adolf Mahr
- Hermann Görtz
- Günther Schütz

=== Irish liaisons ===
- Stephen Hayes
- Seamus O'Donovan
- Seán Russell

=== Irish in Germany ===
- Frank Ryan (Irish republican)
- Friesack Camp
- John Codd
- Francis Stuart

=== Attempts at infiltration ===
- Operation Lobster
- Operation Lobster I
- Operation Seagull (Ireland)
- Operation Seagull I
- Operation Seagull II
- Operation Whale
- Operation Dove (Ireland)
- Operation Sea Eagle
- Plan Kathleen
- Operation Mainau
- Operation Innkeeper
- Operation Osprey
