= Helmut Clissmann =

German spy during WWII

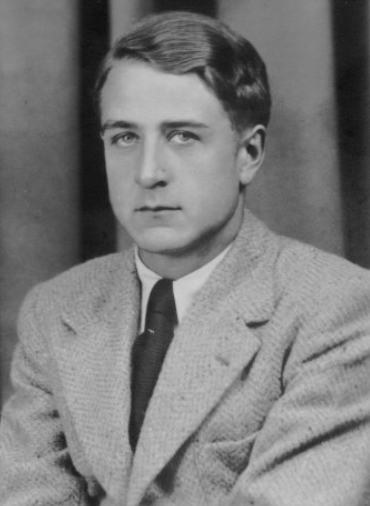
Helmut Clissmann

Helmut Clissmann (11 May 1911 – 6 November 1997) was an Ireland-based Nazi Abwehr agent during World War II.

He engineered the release of Frank Ryan from a Spanish prison. Before World War II, Clissmann was active in the German academic exchange service in Dublin. He was involved in both Operation Lobster and Operation Sea Eagle which were both failed operations with the intent of getting Clissmann into Ireland.

In 2012, a Danish research paper revealed that during his time as an Abwehr agent Clissmann was responsible for training two Danish pro-Nazi covert anti-partisan groups called Schiøler Group and Peter group. He was surprisingly let off during the post-war Nazi court cases in Denmark and travelled shortly afterwards to Ireland.

He became a businessman and set up an agency to import pharmaceutical products. He was also a founding member of what is now the Irish Pharmaceutical Healthcare Association and Amnesty International Ireland. St Killian's German School was co-founded by him and he was made its honorary president-for-life.

Clissmann was friends with fellow German spy Jupp Hoven. He married a County Sligo republican, Elizabeth "Budge" Mulcahy. They had multiple children.

== See also ==
- Fay Taylour
- Hermann Gortz
- William Joyce
