= Operation Seagull I =

WW2 planned German espionage mission

Operation Seagull I ("Unternehmen Möwe I" or "Seemöwe" in German) was an Abwehr II sanctioned mission devised in May 1942. The plan was the brainchild of Kurt Haller and an expert from Abwehr I-Wi (economic). The plan envisioned the use of an Abwehr agent to sabotage the North Scottish power station at Fort William.

The agent chosen by Haller for Seagull I was an Irish POW, which helped form the details of the mission. In detail – the agent would parachute into the vicinity of Glasgow, Scotland where he would form a three-man operational sabotage group from his Irish friends based in the area. The target was to be the electric power station at Fort William and the hydroelectric production facility at Kinlochleven. Seagull I was later refined in June 1942 to operate in tandem with Operation Seagull II with both operations being controlled by radio. It was also planned for each sabotage team in Ireland and Scotland to liaise with each other via radio contact.

== Military context ==
Operation Seagull I planning began after the failure of Operation Innkeeper ("Unternehmen Gastwirt" in German). It appears that Abwehr hoped the training of seemingly compliant Irish POW's who had previous military experience with the British Army would lead to success.

Operation Seagull I was planned in tandem with Operation Seagull II; its genesis can be seen in the context of 1940 – 1941 Abwehr accomplishments in recruiting agents from Irish National POWs held at Stalag XX A (301) also known as "Friesack Camp". While the overall focus of the Abwehr was intelligence gathering, there was a great deal of latitude at the regional planning level in the Abwehr's structure. This led to a series of missions, such as the Seagull series, which with the benefit of hindsight appear to be entirely flawed.

== Agents involved ==
The agent selected for Seagull I was Andrew Walsh aka "Agent Vickers". Walsh was a native of Fethard in County Tipperary, Ireland. He had been captured by the German Army sometime during the period 1940 – April 1941, most likely as part of the British Expeditionary Force active in France and he had been detained in Stalag XX A (301). At this camp he came into contact with fellow Irishmen, possibly including IRA volunteer Frank Ryan during his recruitment efforts for the Abwehr. Walsh was recruited by the Abwehr around early 1941 for training and preparation for the Seagull I mission. His training for this mission included an advanced radio course at the Abwehr school in Stettin, Germany.

Following the completion of their training, both agents – Walsh for Seagull I and James Brady for Seagull II – were to fly to occupied Norway and prepare for their dropzone flight aboard a Focke-Wulf Fw 200 'Condor'. Shortly before takeoff from Germany to Norway, Haller received a call from Abwehr II HQ in Berlin and was ordered to return to Berlin with both of the agents immediately. On arrival it was explained that prior to their takeoff to Norway, Walsh had confided to fellow POW Thomas Cushing that he planned to turn himself in to the police on landing in Britain. Both Walsh and Cushing were arrested by the Gestapo. After this, Operation Seagull I was permanently cancelled.

== Involvement of the IRA ==
There was no involvement or prior knowledge of Operation Seagull by the IRA in Ireland, although it is possible that Frank Ryan, an IRA volunteer located/stranded in Germany, was aware of the mission.

== Footnotes ==
=== Further information/sources ===
- Mark M. Hull, Irish Secrets. German Espionage in Wartime Ireland 1939-1945, 2003, ISBN 978-0-7165-2756-5

=== Notable Abwehr Operations involving Ireland ===
- Operation Lobster
- Operation Lobster I
- Operation Seagull (Ireland)
- Operation Seagull II
- Operation Whale
- Operation Dove (Ireland)
- Operation Osprey
- Operation Sea Eagle
- Plan Kathleen
- Operation Mainau
- Operation Innkeeper

== See also ==
- Operation Green (Ireland)
- IRA Abwehr World War II- Main article on IRA Nazi links
