= Gerald Osborne Slade =

Judge of England and Wales (1891–1962)

Sir Gerald Osborne Slade (1891–1962), styled The Hon. Mr Justice Slade, was a judge of the High Court of England and Wales assigned to the King's Bench Division.

== Biography ==
Born on 14 October 1891, Gerald Slade was educated at Bedford School and at Trinity College, Cambridge. He was called to the Bar in 1921, becoming a member of the Middle Temple and a member of One Brick Court Chambers. He figured prominently in many of the most important civil and criminal cases of the 1930s, 40s and 50s. He defended William Joyce (Lord Haw Haw) at his trial for treason in 1945. He also defended the self-confessed traitor John Amery at his trial in November 1945. Both were convicted and executed.

In 1939, he was appointed as a Member of the Lord Chancellor's Committee on the Law of Defamation and, between 1942 and 1948, he was Recorder of Tenterden. He was appointed as King's Counsel in 1943 and as Chairman of the General Council of the Bar between 1946 and 1948. In 1948, he became a Bencher of the Middle Temple and Chairman of the Legal Committee on Medical Partnerships appointed by the Minister of Health. He was a Judge of the High Court of Justice, King's Bench Division between 1948 and 1962.

Mr Justice Slade died on 10 February 1962.
