= Operation Seagull II =

German military mission planned in June 1942

Operation Seagull II ("Unternehmen Möve II" in German) was an Abwehr II. sanctioned mission planned in June 1942 as a refinement of Operation Seagull I. The plan envisioned in Seagull II was to use an Irish Abwehr agent ("V-Manner"), who would parachute into the area of south-east of Ballycastle in Northern Ireland, recruit a sabotage team from any willing IRA personnel in the area, and attack important "targets of opportunity" in the immediate vicinity. Both operations were to be controlled by radio and with each sabotage team in Ireland and Scotland liaising with each other via radio contact.

== Agents involved and failure of mission ==
The agent selected for Seagull II was James Brady aka. "Agent Metzger". Brady was a native of Strokestown in Roscommon, Ireland who had been stationed in Norway with the British Army. He had been captured by the German Army after they occupied the Channel Islands on 30 June 1940. At the time of the invasion he had been in jail on Guernsey convicted of the attempted murder of a British police officer. Following his capture he was detained in Stalag XX A (301) where he came into contact with fellow Irishmen, possibly including IRA member Frank Ryan under his pseudonym "Mr. Richards". Brady was recruited by the Abwehr around mid 1941 and subsequently issued a South American passport under the identity of "de Lacy." In preparation for the Seagull II mission Brady underwent a series of intensive Abwehr supervised training courses including a radio course at the Abwehr school at Stettin.

Following the completion of their training both agents- Brady for Seagull II and Andrew Walsh aka. "Agent Vickers" for Seagull I were to fly to occupied Norway and prepare for their flight aboard a Focke-Wulf Fw 200 Condor to their dropzone. Shortly before takeoff to Norway, Haller received a call from Abwehr II HQ in Berlin who ordered him to return to Berlin with both of the Irish agents immediately. On arrival it was explained that prior to their takeoff for Norway, Andrew Walsh had been overheard confiding to fellow POW Thomas Cushing that he planned to turn himself into the police on landing in England after hiding the money the Abwehr had given him for operational funds. Cushing had informed on Walsh and both were arrested by the Gestapo. After this, Operation Seagull I was permanently cancelled.

== Military context ==
Operation Seagull II was planned in tandem with Operation Seagull I, its genesis can be seen in the context of 1940 - 1941 Abwehr successes in recruiting agents from POW Irish nationals held at Stalag XX A (301), sometimes referred to as "Friesack Camp". The overall focus of the Abwehr was intelligence gathering but there was a great deal of latitude at the regional planning level in the Abwehr's structure. This led to a series of missions which with the benefit of hindsight appear to be entirely flawed.

The agent taking part in Seagull II would have found a rich target environment in Northern Ireland. The presence of US Army Troops from early 1942 onwards, and the activities of the RAF operating from the region would have presented targets the Abwehr were interested in hurting. However, IRA assistance in the operation may have been harder to come by. By 1942 the organisation had all but been destroyed in Éire, and the complete failure of the IRA Northern Command's Northern Campaign, (September - December 1942), demonstrated that the organisation was entirely curtailed by wartime restrictions, internment, and in Northern Ireland, the activities of the Royal Ulster Constabulary and British Army. It is fair to say that Abwehr staff both at regional Ast level and in Berlin were largely unaware of the problems the IRA faced, and its overall ineffectiveness as an organisation or guerilla force.

== Involvement of the IRA ==
There was no involvement or prior knowledge of Operation Seagull II by the IRA in Ireland, although it is possible that Frank Ryan, an IRA member located/stranded in Germany and working with the Abwehr, was aware of the mission.

== Footnotes ==
=== Further information and sources ===
- Mark M. Hull, Irish Secrets. German Espionage in Wartime Ireland 1939-1945, 2003, ISBN 978-0-7165-2756-5

=== Notable Abwehr operations involving Ireland ===
- Operation Lobster
- Operation Lobster I
- Operation Seagull
- Operation Seagull I
- Operation Whale
- Operation Dove (Ireland)
- Operation Osprey
- Operation Sea Eagle
- Plan Kathleen
- Plan Green
- Operation Mainau
- Operation Innkeeper

== See also ==
- IRA Abwehr World War II - Main article on IRA Nazi links
