= Operation Lobster I =

Infiltration plan by the Abwehr during WW2

Operation Lobster I German: Unternehmen Hummer I
- Part of Operation Lobster
- Type: Infiltration
- Planned by: Abwehr
- Objective: Insert three German agents into Ireland
- Date: July 1940
- Outcome: All three agents captured in Ireland

Operation Lobster I (Unternehmen Hummer I in German) was an Abwehr plan to infiltrate three German agents into Ireland, in July 1940. It was part of a wider series of missions carried out within the framework of Operation Lobster during World War II.

== Infiltration of agents to Ireland ==
The first agent recruited for the mission was Christian Nissen, aka Hein Mueck. In June 1940 he had been called to the Sabotage School at Brandenburg and asked to find a boat suitable for transporting three agents to Ireland. Nissen had served in World War I aboard the Imperial German Navy full-rigged ship Melpomene. Melpomene had been captured by the Royal Navy 100 miles (160 km) west of the port of Queenstown, now Cobh, in County Cork. He was interned first at Templemore, then in Oldcastle, County Meath, and finally on the Isle of Man, so Nissen was familiar with the area.

Nissen selected Soizic, a luxurious 36-foot (11 m) yacht from the harbour in Brest Bay for the voyage. The boat was fitted out like a French fishing vessel and had previously belonged to the French military attaché in Bern. Soizic was missing its propeller, but Nissen decided that the vessel could make it to Ireland under sail alone.

The three men selected for the mission were two South African Germans, Herbert Tributh and Dieter Gärtner, and Indian national Henry Obéd. Their mission was to make their way to England to engage in espionage activity. Tributh and Gärtner were both students, and neither spoke English well. Obéd was to act as their guide and interpreter. Obéd passionately hated the British and had worked for the Abwehr before the invasion of Belgium after being recruited by Kurt Haller. He had not performed as expected in an aborted mission to sabotage Royal Navy ships stationed in Belgium. A late addition to the crew was made on the day of departure when a Breton fisherman appeared to aid Nissen in navigation.

Soizic departed on 3 July 1940, bound for Fastnet Rock, Baltimore Bay, County Cork. The vessel flew the French tricolor. On the third day out, 45 miles (72 km) west of Fastnet Rock, two Royal Navy Town class cruisers, were spotted on the horizon. A British seaplane patrolling the area buzzed the yacht, but Soizic continued unmolested to Baltimore Bay where Nissen awaited nightfall.

== Capture of agents ==
The three agents boarded a dinghy and landed on the shore on 7 July 1940 without being challenged. The landing took place in the area of Traspaleen Sound, Castletownshend. They were carrying suitcases filled with Abwehr-supplied equipment, and were expected to split up immediately and attempt infiltration to Britain. They received no orders to contact the resident German liaison to the IRA – Captain Hermann Görtz – or the German Legation in Dublin.

Later that day, the three men, still travelling together, asked some locals for the fastest way to get to Dublin. On being directed to Skibbereen, the three men took a bus there and then hitched a lift to Drimoleague. They were then apprehended by the Garda Síochána (Irish police) trying to take a bus to Cork. They were asked to allow their luggage to be inspected and who they were. The agents claimed they were sight-seeing students, but were unable to verify their statements further. They were arrested, and the arresting officers called Dublin for assistance. Special Branch officers, dispatched to interview the men, quickly established they were foreign agents. They did this, most likely, by searching their luggage which was found to contain:

- Eight incendiary bombs: each eight ounces in weight, made of cylindrical paper tubes filled with thermite.
- Four tins of gun cotton (nitrocellulose) to a total of 102 ounces. Each tin was labelled 'Carres French Peas'.
- Six No. 8 detonators, concealed in wooden containers disguised as fishing reels.
- Six lengths of safety fuse, two reels of insulating tape, and two cutting pliers.
- Currency totalling £829.

Each of the men was sentenced to seven years hard labour.

The Abwehr II diary entry for 18 July 1940 recorded:

Message received from Dr. Hempel [head of the German Legation in Dublin, Eduard Hempel] that agents landed in operation Lobster I have been arrested. Equipment provided incriminating evidence. By director's decision further sabotage acts against England are not to be made via Ireland but direct against England.

Hempel bitterly complained to his seniors about the botched operation. Firstly, he had been entirely unaware of it. Secondly, he was concerned about how it might affect fragile German-Irish relations. Hempel was right to be concerned; the operation had increased the fears of Irish Military Intelligence G2 Branch and saw the beginning of co-operation between them and MI5 throughout the rest of the war.

Upon his return to France, Nissen informed the Brest Amt (regional Abwehr office) that he had successfully completed his mission. He then went to north-western Brittany, where he would wait until called on for his next mission to Ireland, Operation Lobster II.

== IRA involvement ==
There was no known IRA involvement with or knowledge of Operation Lobster I at the time of the mission.

== Notable Abwehr operations involving Ireland ==
- Operation Lobster
- Operation Seagull (Ireland)
- Operation Seagull I
- Operation Seagull II
- Operation Whale
- Operation Dove (Ireland)
- Operation Osprey
- Operation Sea Eagle
- Plan Kathleen
- Operation Mainau
- Operation Innkeeper

== See also ==
- Operation Green (Ireland)
- IRA Abwehr World War II - Main article on IRA Nazi links

== Bibliography ==
- Mark M. Hull, Irish Secrets. German Espionage in Wartime Ireland 1939-1945, 2003, ISBN 978-0-7165-2756-5
- Enno Stephan, Spies in Ireland, 1963, OCLC 1349261 ISBN 1-131-82692-2 (reprint)
- Carolle J. Carter, The Shamrock and the Swastika, 1977, ISBN 0-87015-221-1
