= John Amery =

British Nazi collaborator (1912–1945)

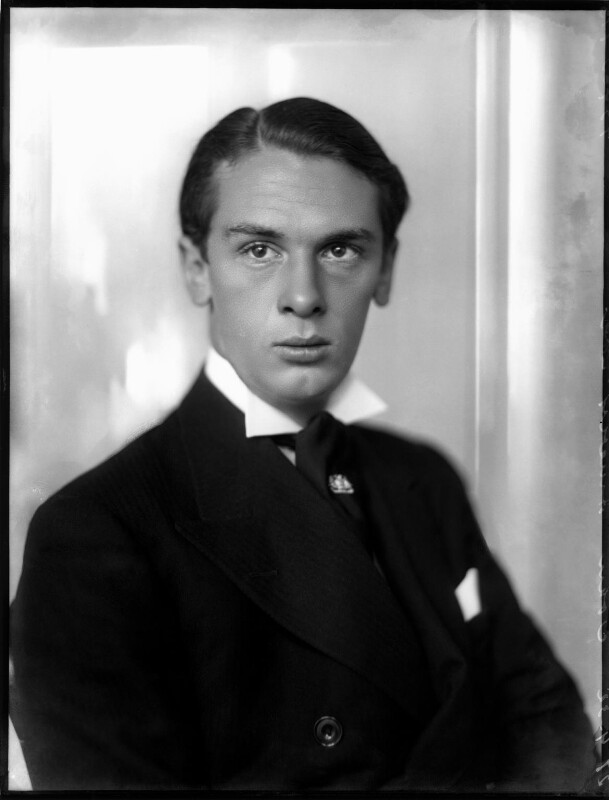
- Amery in 1932
- Born: 14 March 1912; Chelsea, London, England
- Died: 19 December 1945 (aged 33); Wandsworth Prison, London, England
- Occupations: Activist, founder of the British Free Corps
- Movement: Fascism, Nazism, Anti-communism
- Spouse: Una Wing
- Parent: Leo Amery (father)
- Relatives: Julian Amery (brother)
- Status: Executed by hanging
- Conviction: High treason (8 counts)
- Penalty: Death

John Amery (14 March 1912 – 19 December 1945) was a British fascist and Nazi collaborator during World War II. He was the originator of the British Free Corps, a volunteer Waffen-SS unit composed of former British and Dominion prisoners of war.

Amery conducted recruitment efforts, and made propaganda broadcasts for Germany. He later gave direct support to Italian dictator Benito Mussolini. He was prosecuted by the British authorities and pleaded guilty to eight counts of high treason, for which he was sentenced to death, seven months after the war in Europe ended.

== Early life ==
Born in Chelsea, London, John Amery (known as "Jack") was the elder of two children of British statesman Leo Amery, a member of parliament and later Conservative government minister; Leo's mother was a Hungarian Jew who had converted to Protestantism. John's younger brother, Julian, also became a Member of Parliament and served as a minister in a Conservative government in the 1970s.

Amery was a difficult child who ran through a succession of private tutors. He attended nursery at Miss Ironside's School, whose eponymous headmistress described him as "unteachable". Like his father, he was sent to Harrow School, but left after only a year, being described by his housemaster as "without doubt, the most difficult boy I have ever tried to manage." Living in his father's shadow, he strove to make his own way by embarking on a career in film production. Over a period, he set up a number of independent companies, all of which failed; these endeavours rapidly led to bankruptcy.

At the age of 21, Amery married Una Wing, a former prostitute, but was never able to earn enough to keep her for himself. He was constantly appealing to his father for money. A staunch anti-Communist, he came to embrace the doctrines of Nazi Germany on the grounds that they were the only alternative to Bolshevism. He left Britain permanently to live in France after being declared bankrupt in 1936. In Paris, he met the French fascist leader Jacques Doriot, with whom he travelled to Austria, Italy, and Germany to witness the effects of fascism in those countries.

Amery told his family he had joined Francisco Franco's Nationalists during the Spanish Civil War in 1936 and was awarded a medal of honour while serving as an intelligence officer with the Italian Corpo Truppe Volontarie. He actually worked for Franco as a liaison with French Cagoulard groups and gun-runners. After the Spanish war, Amery settled in France.

== Second World War ==
=== Occupied France ===
Amery remained in France following the German invasion in June 1940. On 22 June, the Second Armistice at Compiègne was signed between France and Germany. Amery resided in the territory belonging to the collaborationist Vichy government led by Marshal Philippe Pétain. However, his personality soon antagonised the Vichy Regime, so he made several attempts to leave but was not allowed. The head of the German Armistice Commission offered Amery a chance to live in Germany to work in the political arena but he was unable to get Amery out of occupied France.

In September 1942, Hauptmann Werner Plack obtained for Amery the French travel permit he needed, and in October Plack and Amery travelled to Berlin to speak to the German English Committee. It was at this time that Amery suggested that the Germans consider forming a British anti-Bolshevik legion. Adolf Hitler was impressed by Amery and allowed him to remain in Germany as a guest. During this period, Amery made a series of pro-German propaganda radio broadcasts, attempting to appeal to the British people to join the war on communism.

=== British Free Corps ===
The idea of a British force to fight the communists languished until Amery re-encountered Jacques Doriot during a visit to France in January 1943. Doriot was part of the LVF (Légion des volontaires français contre le bolchévisme), a French volunteer force fighting alongside the Germans on the Eastern Front.

Amery rekindled his idea of a British unit and aimed to recruit 50 to 100 men for propaganda purposes and to establish a core of men with which to attract additional members from British prisoners of war. He also suggested that such a unit could provide more recruits for the other military units made up of foreign nationals.

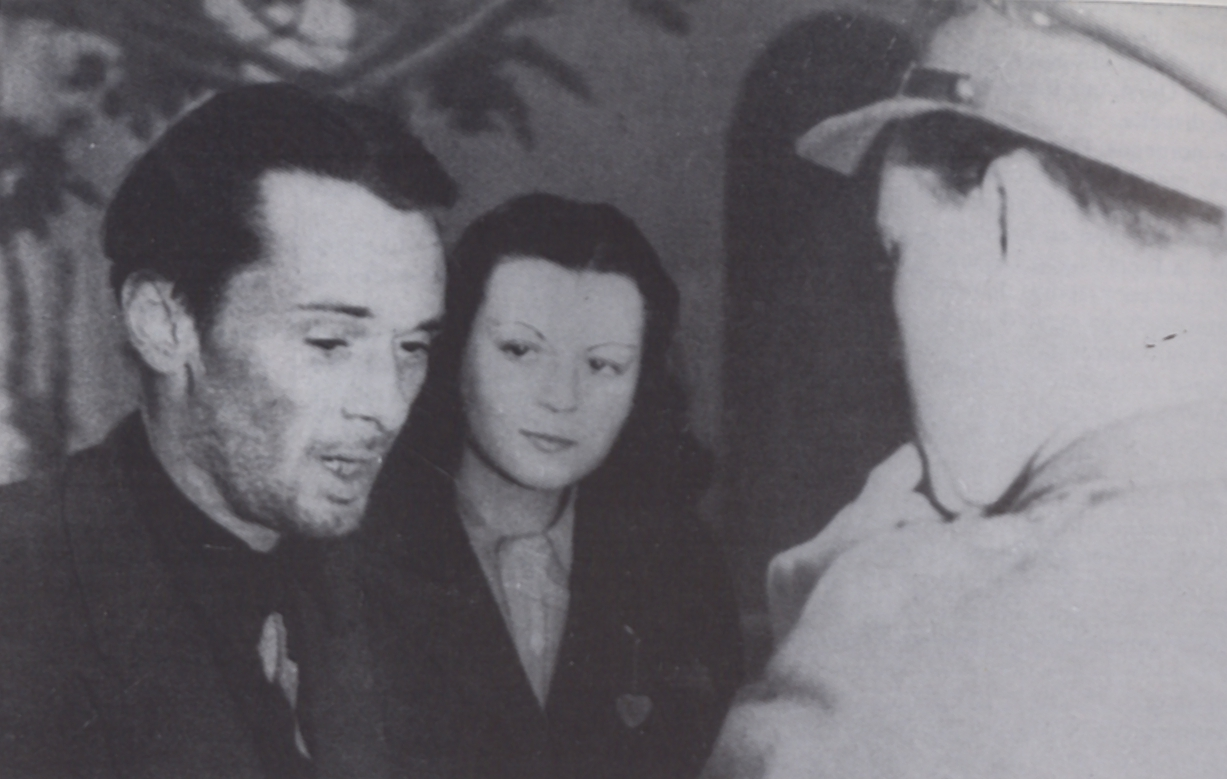
Amery in Milan shortly after his arrest by Italian partisans. With him is his mistress Michelle Thomas. The officer with his back to the camera is Alan Whicker.

Amery's first recruiting drive for what was initially to be called the British Legion of St George took him to the Saint-Denis POW camp outside Paris. Amery addressed between 40 and 50 inmates from British Commonwealth countries and handed out recruiting material. This first effort at recruitment was a complete failure, but he persisted.

Amery's drive for recruits found two men, of whom only one, Kenneth Berry, joined what was later called the BFC. Amery's link to the unit ended in October 1943, when the Waffen SS decided his services were no longer needed, and it was officially renamed the British Free Corps.

=== Arrest ===
Amery continued to broadcast and write propaganda in Berlin until late 1944 when he travelled to Northern Italy to lend support to Benito Mussolini's Salò Republic. On 25 April 1945, Amery was captured along with his French mistress Michelle Thomas by Italian partisans from the Garibaldi Brigade near Como. Amery and Thomas were initially to be executed, but both of them were eventually sent to Milan, where they were handed over to Allied authorities. Amery was wearing the uniform of the "Muti Legion", a fascist paramilitary organisation. The British army officer who took him into custody was Captain Alan Whicker, later known as a broadcaster.

Amery was returned to the United Kingdom by air. With him on the flight was William Joyce, the propaganda broadcaster widely known as "Lord Haw-Haw". They were escorted by three armed soldiers and Leonard Burt, a senior police officer seconded to the British Army Intelligence Corps.

=== Prosecution and execution ===
Amery was prosecuted for treason in London. In a preliminary hearing, he argued that he had never attacked Britain and was an anti-Communist, not a Nazi. At the same time, his brother Julian attempted to show that John had become a Spanish citizen, and therefore would legally be incapable of committing treason against the United Kingdom.

His counsel, Gerald Osborne Slade KC, meanwhile, tried to show that the accused was mentally ill. Amery's sanity was questioned by his own father, Leo, but all efforts to have the court consider his mental state were unsuccessful. Further attempts at a defence were suddenly abandoned on the first day of his scheduled trial, 28 November 1945 when, to general astonishment, Amery pleaded guilty to eight charges of treason, and was sentenced to death. The hearing lasted just eight minutes.

Before accepting Amery's guilty plea, the judge, Mr Justice Humphreys, made certain that Amery realised the only permissible penalty would be death by hanging. After satisfying himself that Amery fully understood the consequences of pleading guilty, the judge announced this verdict:

John Amery, I have read the depositions and the exhibits in this case, and I am satisfied that you knew what you did and that you did it intentionally and deliberately after you had received warning from more than one of your fellow countrymen that the course you were pursuing amounted to high treason. They called you a traitor and you heard them; but in spite of that you continued in that course. You now stand a self-confessed traitor to your King and country, and you have forfeited your right to live.

Amery was hanged in Wandsworth Prison on 19 December 1945 by executioner Albert Pierrepoint, and buried in the prison cemetery. In 1996, Julian Amery had his brother's remains exhumed and cremated, scattering his ashes in France.

An epitaph by his father appears in The Empire at Bay. The Leo Amery Diaries. 1929–1945:

At end of wayward days he found a cause –
'Twas not his Country's – Only time can tell
If that defiance of our ancient laws
Was treason or foreknowledge. He sleeps well.

== Cultural references ==
Ronald Harwood's play An English Tragedy, charting the weeks leading up to Amery's execution following his arrest in Italy and trial in London, adapted for radio by Bert Coules, was broadcast by BBC Radio 4 on 8 May 2010 and 13 April 2012. The cast included Geoffrey Streatfeild as Amery and Derek Jacobi as Leo Amery.

== See also ==
- British Free Corps
- Friesack Camp
- John Codd
- Lord Haw-Haw
- Sir Oswald Mosley

== Bibliography ==
- Copsey, Nigel (2002). "John Amery: the antisemitism of the 'perfect English gentleman'". Patterns of Prejudice. 36 (2): 14–27. doi:10.1080/003132202128811411. ISSN 0031-322X. S2CID 159720614.
- Faber, David (2005). "7 - A Boy Of Unusual Character". Speaking for England: Leo, Julian and John Amery; the tragedy of a political family (1st ed.). London: Free Press. p. 127. ISBN 0-7432-5688-3.
