= Plan W =

Plan of joint military operations during World War II

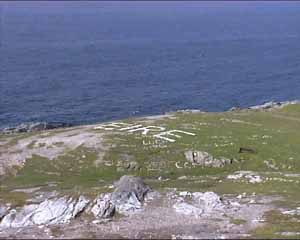
Markings to alert aircraft to neutral Republic of Ireland ("Éire") during World War II on Malin Head, County Donegal

Plan W, during World War II, was a plan of joint military operations between the governments of Ireland and the United Kingdom devised between 1940 and 1942, to be executed in the event of an invasion of Ireland by Nazi Germany.

Although Ireland was officially neutral, after the German invasions of 1939–40 that resulted in the defeat of Poland, the Low Countries and France, the British recognised that Germany planned an invasion of Britain (Operation Sea Lion) and were also concerned about the possibility of a German invasion of Ireland. German planning for Operation Green began in May 1940 and the British began intercepting communications about it in June. The British were interested in securing Ireland, as its capture by German forces would expose their western flank and provide a base of operations for the Luftwaffe in the Battle of the Atlantic and in any operations launched to invade Great Britain as part of Operation Sea Lion.

Irish-British co-operation was a controversial proposal for both sides, as most members of the Irish political establishment had been combatants in the Irish War of Independence between 1919 and 1921. However, because of the threat of German occupation and seizure of Ireland and especially the valuable Irish ports, Plan W was developed. Northern Ireland was to serve as the base of a new British Expeditionary Force that would move across the Irish border to repel the invaders from any beach-head established by German paratroopers. In addition, coordinated actions of the Royal Air Force and Royal Navy were planned to repel German air and sea invasion. According to a restricted file prepared by the British Army's "Q" Movements Transport Control in Belfast, the British would not have crossed the border "until invited to do so by the Irish Government," and it is not clear who would have had the operational authority over the British troops invited into the State by Éamon de Valera. The document added that most people in Ireland probably would have helped the British Army, but "there would have been a small disaffected element capable of considerable guerrilla activities against the British."

By April 1941 the new British Troops in Northern Ireland (BTNI) commander, General Sir Henry Pownall, extended his planning for a German invasion to cover fifty percent of the entire Irish coastline. He believed that German troops were likely to land in Cork, Limerick, Waterford, Westport, Galway, Sligo, and County Donegal, i.e. on the southern or western coasts. British Army personnel also carried out secret intelligence-gathering trips to glean information on the rail system south of the border.

== Context ==
Plan of Operation Sea Lion, which the British feared would be executed alongside a Nazi invasion of Ireland.

=== Political context and early planning ===
Discussions over the possible German invasion of Ireland had been ongoing in Britain since the beginning of 1939. In June 1940, Britain's political and military establishment had witnessed the seemingly invincible German Blitzkrieg which led to the defeat of Poland, the Low Countries, and France, and the retreat of the British Expeditionary Force from Dunkirk. The British suspected that, following their defeat in France, the next step would be a German invasion of Britain – Operation Sea Lion. They did not know, but also suspected, that there was a plan to invade neutral Ireland – Operation Green.

In this context, they embarked on the policy of planning, together with the Irish authorities, for the defence of the island. This was a controversial proposal as most of the Irish political establishment had been combatants in the Anglo-Irish War against the British between 1916 and 1921. For instance, the Fianna Fáil politicians in the Irish government included Éamon de Valera, Seán T. O'Kelly, Seán Lemass, Gerald Boland, Oscar Traynor, Frank Aiken, Seán MacEntee, and Thomas Derrig, all of whom had been active against the British. On the British side, Winston Churchill, and many senior members of his administration had forcibly opposed their bid for an independent Irish state, including setting up the controversial Black and Tans to oppose militant separatism.

However it was not so different from de Valera's position in 1921. During the debates on the Anglo-Irish Treaty in late 1921, de Valera had submitted his ideal draft, known as "Document No.2" which included:

- 2. That, for purposes of common concern, Ireland shall be associated with the States of the British Commonwealth, viz: the Kingdom of Great Britain, the Dominion of Canada, the Commonwealth of Australia, the Dominion of New Zealand, and the Union of South Africa.
- 4. That the matters of "common concern" shall include Defence, Peace and War, Political Treaties, and all matters now treated as of common concern amongst the States of the British Commonwealth, and that in these matters there shall be between Ireland and the States of the British commonwealth "such concerted action founded on consultation as the several Governments may determine".
- 8. That for five years, pending the establishment of Irish coastal defence forces, or for such other period as the Governments of the two countries may later agree upon, facilities for the coastal defence of Ireland shall be given to the British Government as follows:
  (a) In time of peace such harbour and other facilities as are indicated in the Annex hereto, or such other facilities as may from time to time be agreed upon between the British Government and the Government of Ireland.
  (b) In time of war such harbour and other Naval facilities as the British Government may reasonably require for the purposes of such defence as aforesaid.
- 9. That within five years from the date of exchange of ratifications of this treaty a conference between the British and Irish Governments shall be held to arrange for the handing over of the coastal defence of Ireland to the Irish Government unless some other arrangement for naval defence be agreed by both Governments to be desirable in the common interest of Ireland, Great Britain, and the other associated States.

De Valera had proposed that a final settlement between Ireland and Britain would give regard to Britain's future maritime defence, in recognition of Britain's longstanding fear of invasion from the west.

Among the Irish opposition party's Fine Gael leadership, W. T. Cosgrave, Desmond Fitzgerald, Richard Mulcahy and several others had also fought in the previous Irish Civil War and the Irish Army had thousands of veterans from that conflict. Major General Joseph McSweeney, General Officer Commanding (GOC) of Irish Army's Western Command in 1940, had been in the GPO during the Easter Rising. Colonels Archer and Bryan of Military Intelligence G2 had also fought in the conflicts. The IRA member Tom Barry volunteered his services to the Irish Army in 1939 and became operations officer in the 1st Division.

=== British strategic assessment ===
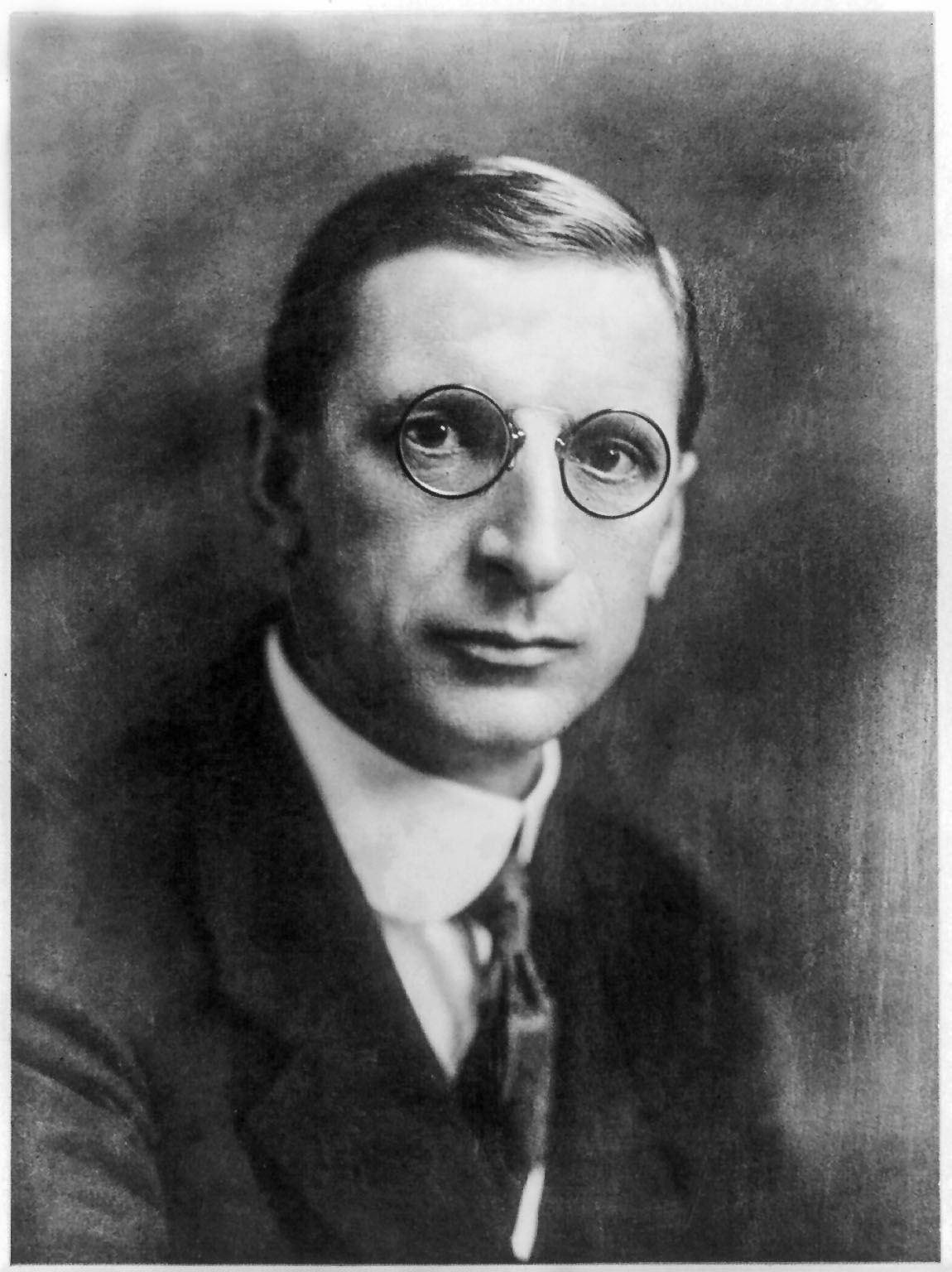
Éamon de Valera, Irish Taoiseach

After the invasion of Belgium and the Netherlands, the British were convinced that an invasion of Ireland would come from the air, via paratroopers. They were not satisfied with the Irish government's defence capability, particularly against airborne troops. The topic of reoccupying the 26 counties of Ireland had been a matter of political conversation in Britain since the beginning of the war. In June 1940, Malcolm MacDonald offered to "give back" the six counties comprising Northern Ireland – an offer of Irish unity – if Ireland would join with the Allies, but the offer was not taken seriously. The same month Major General Bernard "Monty" Montgomery was busy planning the seizure of what he referred to as "Cork and Queenstown (Cobh) in Southern Ireland" (sic). Winston Churchill was to also refer to the "... most heavy and grievous burden placed upon Britain by the Royal Navy's exclusion from the three Treaty Ports [in Ireland]." The Economist reported that Britain should seize the ports if they become "a matter of life and death". The remarks were made in the face of mounting losses in the Battle of the Atlantic.

Attempts were also made on 26 June 1940 to split the consensus in Ireland over the neutrality policy via a possible coup attempt. An approach was made to Richard Mulcahy (leader of Fine Gael at the time) by an Irish-born ex-British Army lieutenant colonel who was a city councillor in the State. Mulcahy recorded that the ex-officer:

"...called to say that 'the people in the North are prepared to make a military convention with this country [Ireland] without reference to the Northern Government... He wanted someone to go up there from here unofficially, to speak to someone in authority and say how the land lay. In reply to questioning, he stated that the people he referred to were the British Army authorities in the North."

This was in effect a proposal for a joint military command of all of Ireland, which the unidentified ex-British Army lieutenant colonel said had been stimulated after discussion with "important members of the British Army in the North of Ireland." It is possible that the simultaneous discussions could have been an attempt to pressure de Valera, the Taoiseach. Unionist politician Sir Emerson Herdman also called to speak with de Valera about obtaining "unity of command" and to ask if Ireland would enter the war in return for an end to partition. Herdman appears to have been acting on behalf of Craigavon, but when de Valera rebuffed him, he was of the view that:

"the only thing to do now for Britain is to send in powerful forces here, and prevent this country being seized, or prevent them [the British] having to use and lose large numbers of troops in putting the Germans out if they got here."

Therefore the W-Plan had a dual purpose:

- a joint plan of action in the event of a compliant Ireland,
- an invasion plan in the event of a German invasion and subsequent resistance.

=== Knowledge of German planning ===
Planning began for Operation Green in May 1940, and the British had intelligence about it beginning in around June of that year. The British were interested in securing Ireland as its capture by German forces would expose their western flank, and provide a base of operations for the Luftwaffe in the Battle of the Atlantic and in any operations launched to conquer Britain as part of Operation Sea Lion. The British suspected that the Germans target for an invasion attempt would be Cork, particularly Cork Harbour with the naval base at Cobh because it was the nearest to Luftwaffe bases in north west France.

=== Irish defence status ===
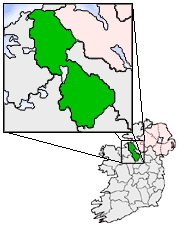
Map of Ireland, with Ballinamore, location of the first line of defence of Ireland against a British invasion.

Irish preparations for defence of the island included protecting against the possibility of British or German attack. The Irish Army drew up contingency plans for an invasion from across the border although only two of its eight brigades were normally based in the northern half of the country. The Second Division did prepare two lines of defence against British invasion, placing explosives beneath bridges along rivers and canals in County Donegal to County Louth. The first line of defence, through Leitrim and Cavan, was centred on the Ballinamore-Ballyconnell canal. The second line chosen was the River Boyne. After a delaying action with a conventional static defence, the 2nd Division was to "split up into smaller groups and start guerrilla resistance against the British."

More detailed defence plans were drawn up for local areas. In Cork city, any seaborne invaders would be engaged by motor torpedo boats and the 9.2 inch and six-inch guns of the Treaty Ports. If the enemy were able to effect a landing in strength, the forts would be demolished by explosives (as would the harbour quays and railway), a blockship would be sunk in the harbour channel and the Haulbowline oil refinery set on fire. The defence of the city itself would be undertaken by the local defence force (LDF) and a regular army battalion, while the First Division would carry out operations in the surrounding countryside.

== Development of Plan W ==
=== The first meetings, 1940 ===
The first meeting on establishing a joint action plan in the event of a German invasion was on 24 May 1940. The meeting was held in London and had been convened to explore every conceivable way in which the German forces may attempt an invasion of Ireland. At the meeting were Joseph Walshe, Secretary (administrative head) of Ireland's Department of External Affairs, Colonel Liam Archer of Irish Military Intelligence (G2), and officers from the Royal Navy, British Army, and the Royal Air Force. The War Office wanted direct liaisons between the Irish military authorities in Dublin and the British General Officer Commanding in Belfast. Walshe and Archer therefore agreed to fly in secret to Belfast with Lieutenant Colonel Dudley Clarke. In Belfast, two British Army staff officers were collected and the group travelled back to Dublin by rail. This meeting was held underneath Government buildings in Kildare Street and included a number of Irish Army officers. The meeting was informed that General Sir Hubert Huddleston, the General Officer Commanding (GOC.) Northern Ireland, was already under orders to take a mobile column south of the border to help the Irish Army if the Germans invaded.

Clarke also met with the Irish Army Chief of Staff, General Daniel McKenna, who explained that the British would not be allowed into the south of Ireland before the Germans arrived. Clarke also met with the Irish Minister for Co-ordination of Defensive Measures, Frank Aiken, and discussed "new ideas for the mechanical improvement of the war." The point of these meetings was to secure an understanding on the threat faced by both Britain and Ireland, and the benefit of joint action – the details would later be worked out by the respective armed services.

Clarke returned to London on 28 May 1940, where he reported that the Irish Army had given him full details of their organisation and equipment "without reservation" and had in return requested information on British troop strength in Northern Ireland. It had been agreed that in the event of a German invasion, the Irish would call for assistance from Huddleston in Belfast. The British Army's advance from Northern Ireland into neutral Ireland was to be called Plan W.

=== Operational details ===
As noted, Cork was the suspected target of an invasion because it was the nearest landfall between Luftwaffe bases in north-western France and the island of Ireland. Northern Ireland was to serve as the base of a new British Expeditionary Force, that would move into the State to repel the invaders from any beach-head that was established. Troops of the 53rd Division in Belfast were held in readiness for the advance. A brigade of Royal Marines stationed at Milford Haven were also prepared to seize a bridge-head in Wexford the moment the Germans landed. Officers at the headquarters (HQ) of British troops in Northern Ireland, Thiepval Barracks, Lisburn, County Antrim estimated that the Germans could embark five divisions by sea to Ireland although "not more than 2 to 3 would reach land". Up to 8,000 German airborne troops could be flown into the State, some of them by seaplanes which would land on the lakes. The British striking force of 53 Division, later augmented by the 5th Battalion, Cheshire Regiment, were to concentrate on the west of Down and Armagh borders, then drive across the border and race towards Dublin along three main roads – the Belfast – Dublin coastal road through Dundalk, Drogheda and Balbriggan, the inland road through Ardee and Slane, and the Castleblayney — Carrickmacross — Navan road. It is not clear who would have had the operational authority over the British troops invited into Ireland by de Valera, but it is assumed the British would retain command.

By December 1940 the plan had been extended. While the first British striking force headed for Dublin, the British 61st Division, in a separate operation, would move across the border into County Donegal and secure the Treaty port of Lough Swilly for the Royal Navy, providing the British Government with a third of the naval defence requirements that they had been requesting from de Valera for more than a year. The British Troops in Northern Ireland (BTNI) war diary of the time lists 278 Irish troops at Lough Swilly and only 976 Irish troops in the rest of Donegal.

The diary goes on to say that in the event of an invasion "close co-operation is to be maintained with Éire forces including Local Security Force if friendly". It is a feature of other British documents from the time; for example one reads "If Éire be hostile it may be necessary for Royal Signals units to take over the civil telephone system".

According to a restricted file prepared by the British Army's 'Q' Movements Transport Control in Belfast, the British would not have crossed the border "until invited to do so by the Éire Government", but the document added that although most people in the State probably would have helped the British Army, "there would have been a small disaffected element capable of considerable guerrilla activities against us."

Sir John Loader Maffey, the British representative to Ireland since 1939, was to transmit the code word "Pumpkins" (later replaced by "Measure") to begin the troop movement of the 53rd Division onto Irish soil. This codeword would be received by Huddleston and Lieutenant General Harold Franklyn, the BTNI commander.

Elaborate plans were made in Belfast to supply the BEF with guns, ammunition, petrol, and medical equipment by rail. The British marshalling yards at Balmoral, south of Belfast, were extended to take long ammunition and fuel trains which were loaded and ready on new sidings. In addition three ambulance trains were equipped and positioned around Belfast and an ambulance railhead established to take the wounded returning from the south of Ireland. British soldiers stripped the sides from dozens of coal trucks transforming them into flat cars for armoured vehicles and tanks that would be sent southwards. Once the 53rd Division was committed in Ireland, the British military authorities planned to run thirty-eight supply trains on the two railway lines to Dublin every day – thirty down the main line through Drogheda (if the viaduct over the River Boyne remained undamaged), and the remainder along the track which cut through County Cavan. The Port of Belfast was estimated to have needed to handle 10,000 tons of stores a week and could receive up to 5,000 troops every day for the battle-front.

The RAF were to fly three Hurricane fighter squadrons into Baldonnel Airfield southwest of Dublin and two Fairey Battle light bomber squadrons into Collinstown to attack German troops in Cork. The British 1st Heavy Anti-Aircraft Regiment was to be moved into the State to defend the Drogheda viaduct, Collinstown, and Baldonnel. The Royal Navy was to issue instructions that all British and foreign ships depart from Irish ports. Vessels in Londonderry were to head for the Clyde and boats in Belfast were to head for Holyhead and Liverpool. As many ships as possible would be cleared from Irish ports and taken to the Clyde, Holyhead and Fishguard. Royal Navy officers in Dublin were to direct this exodus and the taking on of refugees was not to be encouraged. British submarines were to patrol off Cork and the Shannon in readiness for an invasion, and should one occur, the Royal Navy was to declare a "sink on sight" zone in the western approaches and off the south and west coasts of Ireland.

By April 1941, the new BTNI commander, General Sir Henry Pownall extended his planning for a German invasion to cover fifty percent of the entire Irish coastline. He believed that German troops were likely to land in Cork, Limerick, Waterford, Westport, Galway, Sligo, and Donegal. British Army personnel also carried out secret intelligence gathering trips to glean information on the rail system south of the border.

=== Irish planning ===
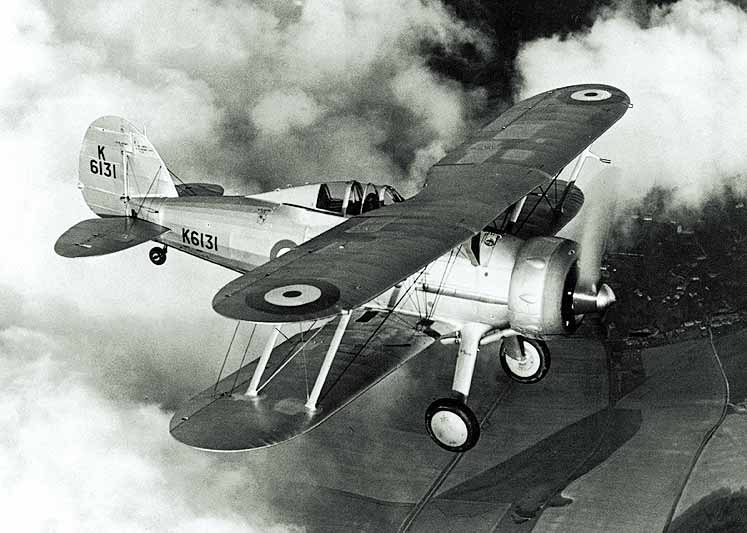
The Irish Air Corps had four Gloster Gladiators similar to the British-marked aircraft shown here.

By May 1940 Irish troops were already organised in mobile columns to deal with parachute landings. By October 1940, four more regular army brigades had been raised in the State and LSF recruiting figures were increasing. The German style helmets of the army had been replaced by the pale green uniforms and rimmed style helmets of the British Army. They had a total of sixteen medium armoured cars, and thirty Ford and Rolls-Royce light armoured cars. By early 1941, two infantry divisions had been activated. First Division was headquartered in Cork and included: 1st Brigade (HQ Clonmel: 10th, 13th, 21st Battalions), 3rd Brigade (HQ Cork: 4th, 19th, 31st Battalions), 7th Brigade (HQ Limerick: 9th, 12th, 15th Battalions) Second Division was headquartered in Dublin and comprised: 2nd Brigade (HQ Dublin 2nd, 5th, 11th Battalions), 4th Brigade (HQ Mullingar 6th, 8th, 20th Battalions), 6th Brigade (HQ Dublin 7th, 18th, 22nd Battalions) There were also two independent brigades: 5th Brigade (southeast Ireland 3rd, 16th, 25th Battalions) 8th Brigade: (Rineanna 1st, 23rd Battalions) There were also three garrison battalions and the Coastal Defence Artillery forts at Cork, Bere Island, Donegal, Shannon and Waterford. The Irish Defence Forces, regular and reserve, were an all-volunteer force.

If the Germans had landed where the British and Irish expected them to, they would have been engaged by the Irish Army's Fifth Brigade who had primary responsibility for the defence of Waterford and Wexford. They would have been soon supported by General Michael Joe Costello's 1st Irish Division from Cork and General Hugo MacNeill's 2nd Division. The British would establish their railhead near the Fairyhouse race course and be given billets at Lusk, Howth, and Portmarnock north of Dublin.

The Irish Air Corps consisted largely of nine Avro Anson light bombers and four Gloster Gladiators, which provided the only fighter defence for the country. However, in 1940 six second-hand Hawker Hinds were added to the Air Corps and later in the war the Irish cannibalised and repaired several Allied aircraft that had crash landed in their territory, eventually putting two RAF Hurricanes, a Fairey Battle and an American-built Lockheed Hudson into service. From 1942 onwards a total of twenty Hawker Hurricanes entered Irish Air Corps service.

The Marine Service only acquired its first Motor Torpedo Boat in January 1940, increasing to a total of six by 1942. However, the only patrol vessels were the "Muirchu" and the "Fort Rannoch", two former British gunboats. Besides these vessels there was one "mine planter" and a barge. The Marine Service did not acquire any other ships during the war.

The Local Security Force was intended to harass and delay enemy forces by dynamiting bridges (already chambered for the purpose) and organising small ambushes and sniping attacks. Armament was paltry at first, with many units making do with requisitioned shotguns, but from 1941 on, American M1917 Enfield rifles became available. In January 1941, the LSF was split into two, the 'A' force moving from police to military control and taking the new title Local Defence Force. The B Group retained the title LSF and functioned essentially as an unarmed police reserve throughout the Emergency. In general, those aged under forty went with the LDF, those older remained with the LSF.

== See also ==
- Operation Dove (Ireland)
- Operation Mainau
- Plan Kathleen
