= Operation Dove (Ireland) =

Aborted 1940 German World War II mission

Operation Dove ("Unternehmen Taube" in German) also sometimes known as Operation Pigeon, was an Abwehr sanctioned mission devised in early 1940. The plan envisioned the transport of IRA Chief of Staff Seán Russell to Ireland, and on the arrival of Frank Ryan in Berlin three days before the launch of the operation, it was also decided to transport him during the operation.

== Russell's arrival and activities in Germany ==
Seán Russell had arrived in Berlin on 5 May 1940, four days after arriving in Genoa from the United States. Russell was informed of Operation Mainau, the plan to parachute Dr. Hermann Görtz into Ireland. Russell was asked to brief Görtz on Ireland before his departure that night, but missed his takeoff from the Fritzlar airfield near Kassel.

By 20 May, Russell had begun training with Abwehr in the use of the latest German explosive ordnance. This training was conducted at the Abwehr training school/lab in Tegel, which specialised in the design of explosives as everyday objects. Russell also visited the training area for the Brandenburg Regiment, the 'Quenzgut,' where he observed trainees and instructors working with sabotage materials in a field environment. As he had received explosives training, his return to Ireland with a definite sabotage objective was planned by German Intelligence. His total training time with German Intelligence lasted over three months.

The mission formed part of boarder German efforts to establish cooperation with the IRA in anticipation of a possible invasion of Britain. German intelligence viewed the organization as a potential ally because of its opposition to British rule in Northern Ireland. During his contacts with German officials in 1940, Russell sought to secure German support for IRA activities and persuaded the Germans that the organization could assist operations against British forces in Northern Ireland as part of the preparations associated with Operation Sea Lion. His planned return to Ireland was intended to help prepare for this role.

== Immediate context ==
While Görtz had landed successfully, the capture of the German agents from Operation Lobster I did not prevent Abwehr chief Wilhelm Canaris from allowing the transport of Russell to continue. Both Russell and Frank Ryan departed aboard U-65 from Wilhelmshaven on 8 August — the mission was dubbed Operation Dove.

Russell became ill during the journey and complained of stomach pains. U-65 was not staffed with a doctor and he died on 14 August 100 mi (87 nmi; 160 km) short of Galway. He was buried at sea and the mission aborted.

== Footnotes ==
=== Further information and sources ===
- Mark M. Hull, Irish Secrets. German Espionage in Wartime Ireland 1939-1945, Dublin:Irish Academic Press, 2003, ISBN 978-0-7165-2756-5

== Notable Abwehr operations involving Ireland ==
- Operation Lobster
- Operation Lobster I
- Operation Seagull
- Operation Seagull I
- Operation Seagull II
- Operation Whale
- Operation Osprey
- Operation Sea Eagle
- Plan Kathleen
- Operation Green (Ireland)
- Operation Mainau
- Operation Innkeeper

== See also ==
- The Emergency
- Irish Republican Army–Abwehr collaboration
