= Friedrich Carl Marwede =

German politician

Friedrich Carl or C. Marwede (15 November 1895 - 28 May 1969) was a German editor, a politician in his birthplace of Bremen with the DNVP and CDU, and a member of Bremen's Bürgerschaft.

== Life ==
A businessman's son, he attended Bremen's Neue Gymnasium and studied history and law in Switzerland. He was captured by the Russians during the First World War and sent to Siberia, finally escaping in 1920. That year he joined the right-wing DNVP, becoming its managing director in Bremen and from 1923 to 1924 serving as a member of the city's Bürgerschaft. He was chief editor of the Bremer Zeitung from 1923 to 1926, then of the Kösliner Zeitung. On the Nazi seizure of power he lost the latter post, becoming an officer in the OKW (OKW).

He ultimately joined the German Army's overseas intelligence activities in a variety of roles in the Abwehr's Group II (relations with foreign armed forces). In 1939 he made contact with the Irish Republican Army (IRA). In occupied Belgium he made contacts in separatist Flemish groups, acting as the handler of Alfred Toepfer and other agents. By the war's end he was an Oberstleutnant and in 1945 was captured by the British.

After the war he ran a translation service in Bremen and moved to the CDU, co-editing Echo, the party newspaper. In 1950 he also founded its Arbeitsgemeinschaft demokratischer Kreise(Working Group of Democratic Circles). In 1953 he was elected to the Bürgerschaft again, remaining in it for ten years and serving in various deputations. From 1955 onwards he was deputy chairman of the CDU's parliamentary group. and from 1957 to 1959 its leader, succeeding Rudolf Rübberdt and preceding Karl Krammig. He was active on cultural and theatrical matters in the Bürgerschaft, along with business relating to Radio Bremen and the foundation of the University of Bremen. He died in Bremen.

== Bibliography ==
- (in German) Herbert Schwarzwälder: Das Große Bremen-Lexikon. 2., aktualisierte, überarbeitete und erweiterte Auflage. Edition Temmen, Bremen 2003, ISBN 3-86108-693-X.
