= Irland-Redaktion =

Propaganda radio station in Nazi Germany

Irland-Redaktion (lit. 'Ireland Edition') was a pro-German propaganda radio station that broadcast from Germany during the Second World War. It was founded by Ludwig Mühlhausen in December 1939. He left it after two years to work with the S.S. in France.
