= Operation Green (Ireland) =

Potential WWII German invasion of Ireland

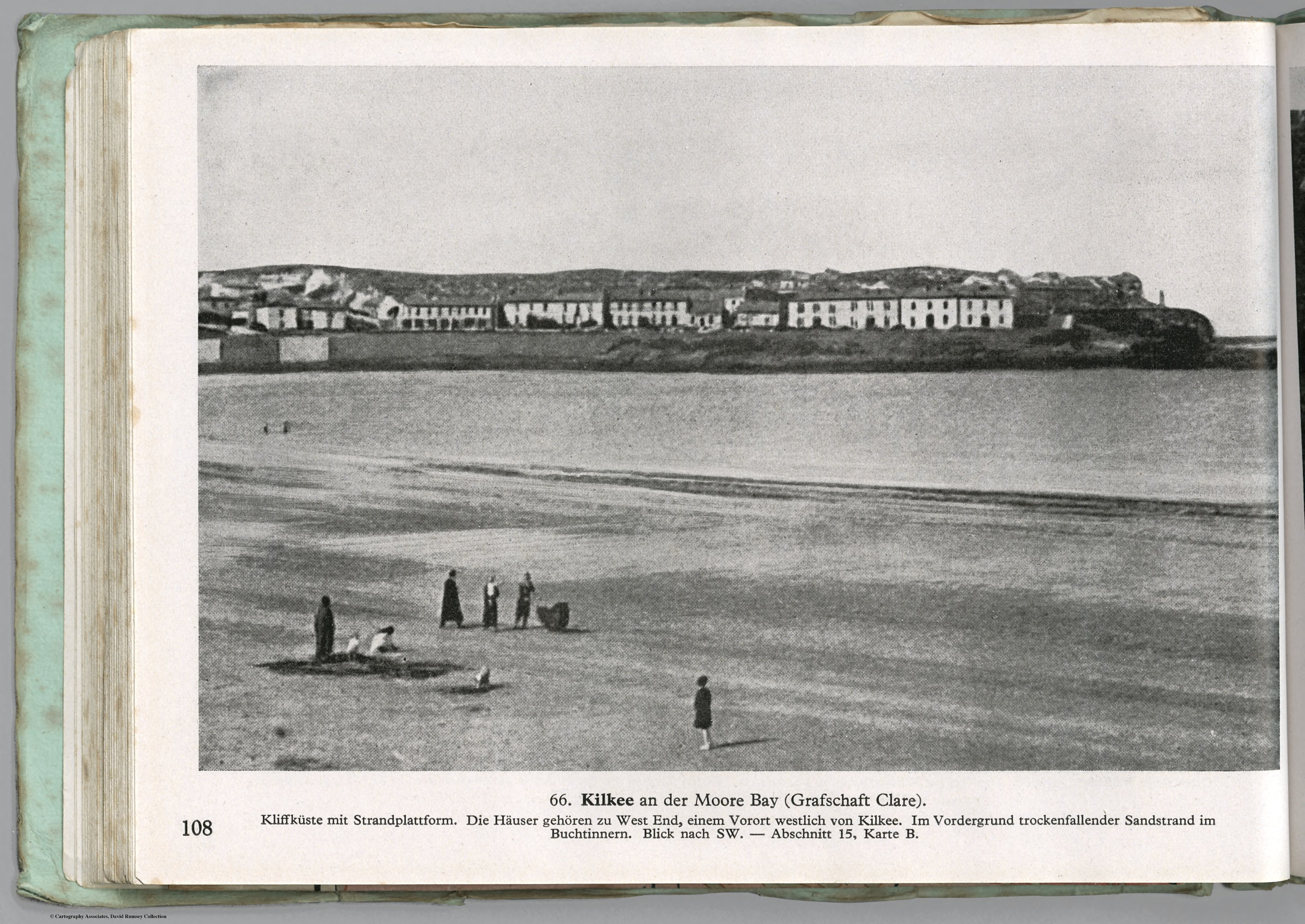
Photograph of Kilkee, County Clare, Ireland, in the planning documents for Operation Sea Lion

Operation Green (German: Unternehmen Grün) often also referred to as Case Green (Fall Grün) or Plan Green (Plan Grün), was a full-scale operations plan for a Nazi German invasion of Ireland planned by an unknown German officer known by the alias "Hadel" in support of Operation Sea Lion (Unternehmen Seelöwe), the invasion of the United Kingdom, during World War II. Despite its detailed nature, Operation Green is thought to have been designed only as a credible threat or feint, not an actual operation. The British government, in secret liaison with the Irish government, drafted Plan W, a planned occupation of Ireland by the British Armed Forces to counteract a potential German invasion.

Implementation of Green was the responsibility of General der Artillerie Leonhard Kaupisch, commander of the German Fourth and Seventh Army Corps, Army Group B. The originator of the idea for Green is thought to be newly promoted Generalfeldmarschall Fedor von Bock, Army Group B. Bock had operational command for the western flank under Operation Sea Lion. Once collated, thirty-two copies of Green were distributed as "Top Secret" on 8 August 1940 to the German High Command; a number of copies survived World War II.

== Operational feasibility ==
Green was conceived in early-to mid-1940 and the plan was drawn up in August 1940, under three weeks after Hitler issued his initial warning order for Operation Sea Lion on 16 July 1940. The plan was widely circulated and even publicised during the period 1940–1941. By 1942 Green had even made its way into the hands of the Irish military via the British military and was subsequently translated into English by Irish Military Intelligence G2 Branch. This has raised suspicion that intercepted 'chatter' about Green may have been aimed at creating a 'bogeyman' in the minds of British military planners on their western flank. There was some truth to this; one example is Generalmajor Walter Warlimont's recollection from 28 June 1940 of an operational instruction issued by the High Command. The directive was to mislead the enemy about a possible invasion of neutral Ireland using "all available information media". The intention was to spread rumours that German forces were preparing a landing in Ireland to place a further stranglehold on Britain, reinforcing the current "siege". It is possible that these efforts heightened the state of alert and were a cause of alarm in Britain, leading to the British expending significant effort in trying to convince the Irish government to abandon neutrality and side with the Allies.

=== Raeder's estimation ===
The estimation of Grand Admiral Erich Raeder of the Naval High Command was lukewarm, just as it had been for Sea Lion. His concern was German naval strength and resupply of any landed troops:

To a defending force, cut off and left to its own devices, the topography of the country [Ireland] does not afford us much protection... without supplies and reinforcements they would soon feel the increasing pressure of British expeditionary force brought over under the protection of British naval power; sooner or later our own troops would face a situation similar to Namsos or Dunkirk.

In this sense Green can be seen as a worst-case scenario for the Oberkommando der Wehrmacht (OKW). While Kaupisch was to continue planning and training for Sea Lion/Green he seems to have shelved preparations in late 1940 and not returned to them. From his point of view Green had become a feint. This view is reinforced by examining one of the warnings offered to participating German forces in the plan:

The 'Green' operation confronts us with an entirely new task. Therefore there are no precedents from which we can work. In many cases, troops will have to look after themselves. Each commander must look for a way to achieve his individual objective. Everything depends on the extent of co-operation, on each individual's alertness and ability to take independent action. Confidence in the achievements of German Leadership and the German Soldier should be the foundation of this operation.

The prognosis for German land forces taking part in Green was therefore not good. They had no experience of large-scale amphibious warfare; they might have to fight and survive, without resupply, artillery support or screening aerial support, amongst a hostile citizenry. They would have to fight against expected British troop movements from the north of the island, and from Great Britain invading Ireland to protect its flank. These drawbacks, whilst probably acceptable to Hitler, were not acceptable to Raeder in his considered estimation four months after the plan was first floated. He did not agree that Ireland could become the "back door" into Britain with the present strength of German forces.

As Sea Lion was rescheduled on 12 October 1940 for the Spring of 1941, then permanently cancelled on 13 February 1943, Green became an irrelevance.

== Accuracy and detail of Green ==
Despite the fact that Abwehr intelligence-gathering in Ireland had not begun until mid-1939, Green was thorough in detail. This can probably be attributed to the intelligence-gathering of German civilians based in Ireland during the 1930s. That the plan for Green was completed days after being ordered is a testament to the planning staff in collating the data. Hitler, who continued to hold out hope for a détente with Britain, refused to allow the Abwehr to conduct intelligence gathering operations on British soil from 1936 to 1938. Even when intelligence gathering operations in Britain were attempted following the fall of France it was mostly disastrous (see Operation Lobster I and Operation Seagull). As Sea Lion was postponed and eventually shelved following the launching of Operation Barbarossa, the planning staff working on it issued two reprints, adding detail as they went.

=== Detail in Green ===
The full briefing package for Green runs to five volumes, each devoted to a particular area of military interest. A good example of the detail is a seventy five-page booklet titled "Militärgeographische Angaben über Irland" ("Military Geographical data on Ireland"). This booklet described the frontier, size, historical background, industry, transport infrastructure, vegetation, climate, and weather of the island. It also included seventeen pages of detailed sketches of 233 cities, towns, and villages, complete with a lexicon. 120 photos accompanied the booklet; annexes contained street maps of twenty-five cities and towns, including street names and addresses of garage owners.

A second print of the plan in October 1941 added 332 photographs of the Irish countryside and coastline, mostly tourist photos, which were used to reference highly accurate Ordnance Survey maps. There were also details on spring tides, geological formations and possible routes German troops could take off projected invasion beaches. Another addendum included in the further reprinting of the plan in 1942 by the OKL (Luftwaffe High Command), titled "Küsten-Beschreibung des Irischen Freistaates (Irland)" ("Coastal description of the Irish Free State"), contained high-altitude aerial photographs of the areas in question, some taken from 30,000 feet, with houses and trees visible.

Despite this attention to detail, and the improvements in the volume of data with each reprinting, a lot of the data was out of date or incomplete. For example, the Galway–Clifden railway is described as being operational, but it had closed in 1935. Ireland was also described as perfectly suited to military operations because of its "excellent network of roads", and details on population centres such as Derry and Belfast were accurate but lacked information on British troop concentrations based in these cities. On the other hand, the Ardnacrusha power station on the lower River Shannon was entirely detailed in the plan, thanks to the help of the German firm Siemens, which had built it prior to the war.

== Military details of Plan Green ==
Green is often confused with a plan authored by the Irish Republican Army and sent to German Intelligence (Abwehr) in August 1940. The IRA authored plan was later titled "Plan Kathleen" by the Abwehr and "Operation Artus" by the German Foreign Ministry. Green and Plan Kathleen should not be confused. There are no details in Green on the politics of Ireland, only military capacity estimates. Green makes no mention of the IRA in these estimates, and even if the planners had wanted to include detail and estimates of the IRA they probably would not have gained much accurate information from the Abwehr.

=== Green within Sea Lion framework ===
Leaving aside the possible propaganda and tactical aims of Green, the military planning aspects of Green are best considered as complementing the aims of Sea Lion. In pursuit of Sea Lion, Plan Green was thought to meet a number of military objectives:

- to draw off British Army troops stationed in Northern Ireland who might otherwise be sent to aid the defence of Britain,
- deny Ireland as a staging point/refuge to British troops,
- provide a staging post for Luftwaffe forces to subdue northern Britain.

In the event of Operation Sea Lion's success, fulfilment of Operation Green was expected to be the next step, insofar as operational plans stay static during wartime. No plans were made for the imposition of Nazi government in Ireland, but the "rounding up of [Irish] dissidents" were included as part of the operation. Dublin was mentioned as one of six German administrative headquarters between the two islands that were to be established on the successful completion of Sea Lion.

=== Implementation and objectives of the plan ===
The jumping off point for Green was to be the French ports of Lorient, Saint-Nazaire, and Nantes with an initial force of 3,900 troops. The objective was to be an eighty-five-mile stretch of the southern coast of Ireland between Wexford and Dungarvan. Having captured the ports there, German units were expected to fight their way up to thirty miles inland to establish a beach-head running from Gorey on the Wexford-Dublin road across the 2,610 feet height of Mount Leinster above Borris, County Carlow, through Thomastown in County Kilkenny, to Clonmel in County Tipperary.

The first landings were to include artillery and commando squadrons and a motorised infantry battalion. A bridge building battalion was also to be landed along with three anti-aircraft companies and several 'raiding patrols' to probe Irish Army defences. Reserves from the German 61st, 72nd, and 290th Divisions were to take up occupation duties in the Gorey-Dungarvan bridgehead once it had been established. The overall details for the plan appear to be sketchy from this point onwards, and mostly would have depended on the success or failure of Operation Sea Lion in Britain.

=== Amphibious assault ===
Beach-heads considered in Green included the Waterford-Wexford sector (favoured), the estuary of the River Shannon near Limerick, Galway Bay, Donegal Bay with Killala, Ballina and Sligo, Lough Foyle with Derry, the 'Bay of Belfast' (Belfast Lough), and Cobh in Cork.

The landings were to be effected by sea craft available in occupied France at the time, but there were few in existence and Operation Sea Lion was to have priority- further reasons why Raeder was not happy with Green. Green was expected to use over 50,000 German troops and Sea Lion was expected to use 160,000 but for Green the Germans only found two steamships available around the north-western ports of France- the French Versailles and the German Eule together with three small coasters: Mebillo, Clio and Franzine.

It is also worth pointing out that to get to Ireland the departing ships would have had to circumnavigate the British coastline at Cornwall. Every vessel taking part in Green was to carry anti-aircraft weaponry indicating that the planners expected the Royal Air Force (RAF) to intercept them, although air cover from the Luftwaffe's West of France Air Command was to be provided as part of Sea Lion.

== Irish defences against Green ==
It was anticipated that Irish forces would resist the initial invasion. Landing craft and vessels transporting the German troops were to be equipped with forward-facing guns, and invading troops were instructed to assume defensive positions as soon as they came under fire, considering retreat only in the most dire emergency.

There were gaps in the German planning; for instance the plans for the proposed incursion of Cobh (as a possible beach-head area in Green) is not accompanied by details of the 9.2 inch and 6 inch artillery defences located there. This weaponry had formed part of the defences of the Treaty Ports, which the British had handed over to Irish forces in 1938.

Green dealt only with the plan for invasion, as no details on any subjugation of the population and eventual conquest of the entire island were included. Among the Irish population, however, there was a degree of support for Nazi Germany due to a variety of reasons, including resentment of past British rule and the recent partition of the country. Sketchiness with regards to the plan has contributed to an assessment that it was more a diversionary attack than an actual attempt to take over the island. Although, once committed it may have been hard for German forces to withdraw.

== Involvement of the IRA ==
There was no involvement or prior knowledge of Green by the IRA in Ireland. It is likely, however, that the possibility of such planning was on the mind of Sean Russell and his acting Chief of Staff Stephen Hayes. Russell is known to have reached out to the German Foreign Ministry and Abwehr during his time in Berlin, and Hayes is known to have sanctioned Plan Kathleen before it was delivered to the Abwehr in Berlin in August 1940. However, no operational instructions were issued to Abwehr agents to gather data on Ireland in preparation for Green. This is possibly because the planners felt they had enough militarily useful data already, but likely because Green, although thorough, was created in a hurry. Later editions contained no data from the IRA, instead only adding from publicly available information in reference books and details provided by German civilians who had worked in Ireland during the 1930s.

== See also ==
- The Emergency
- Oskar Metzke
- IRA Abwehr World War II — Main article on IRA Nazi links

=== Abwehr operations involving Ireland ===
- Operation Lobster
- Operation Lobster I
- Operation Seagull (Ireland)
- Operation Seagull I
- Operation Seagull II
- Operation Whale
- Operation Dove (Ireland)
- Operation Osprey
- Operation Sea Eagle
- Plan Kathleen
- Operation Mainau
- Operation Innkeeper

== Bibliography ==
- Germany. 1940. Militärgeographische Angaben über Irland. Berlin: Generalstab des Heeres, Abt. für Kriegskarten und Vermessungswesen (IV. Mil.-Geo.). OCLC: 10934333. (in German)

=== Further information/sources ===
- A copy of Plan Green is located at the Military Archives, Cathal Brugha Barracks, Dublin.
- Mark M. Hull, Irish Secrets. German Espionage in Wartime Ireland 1939–1945, 2003, ISBN 978-0-7165-2756-5
- Robert Fisk, In Time of War (Gill and Macmillan) 1983 ISBN 0-7171-2411-8
- Some information on defensive planning in Northern Ireland as part of the overall British defence available here.
