= Operation Lobster =

World War II German special operation in Britain

Operation Lobster German: Unternehmen Hummer
- Planned by: Abwehr
- Commanded by: Major Klug
- Objective: Send agents to infiltrate Britain from Norway and France
- Date: 1940
- Outcome: Around twenty agents inserted into Britain and Ireland

In 1940 the Germans decided to send agents and saboteurs to infiltrate Britain from Norway and northern France. This plan was given the codename Operation Lobster (German: Unternehmen Hummer). It remained in place despite the collapse of plans for the invasion of Britain in Operation Sea Lion (German: Unternehmen Seelöwe).

== Military context ==
After victory in France, the Abwehr had been tasked with retrieving current, reliable data on British defences and war-making capability. Three days before the end of the German campaign in France on 25 June 1940, Abwehr II's war diary noted:

On the direction of the Head of Division (Lahousen [Generalmajor Erwin von Lahousen]) Abwehr II's work has in the main been switched over to the war with England. In addition, preparations are being made for work overseas. The only work in the east now concerns looking after the Ukrainian minority and transferring old contacts to Abwehr III. At the same time Abwehr II's work in Holland, Belgium and France is diminishing and being transferred.

The Oberkommando der Wehrmacht (OKW) issued planning directives asking Abwehr I/II for:

- Data regarding the state of Britain's defences.
- Data on the feasibility of a German invasion force landing on the island of Ireland.
- Data on the creation/insertion of a fifth column into Britain which could perform sabotage and link up with any invading German ground troops.

Lobster was controlled by Major Klug of Office WN 2 (Abwehr II) in Berlin. Lobster involved sending missions to Britain by a variety of means, but generally by sea.

Lobster was in the context of Operation Sea Lion which in turn involved Plan Green (German: Plan Grün). Before events in the military sphere overtook plans for the launching of Sea Lion, the Abwehr successfully inserted almost twenty agents into Britain and Ireland between the summer and early autumn of 1940.

== Notable operations involving Ireland ==
- Operation Lobster I
- Operation Seagull (Ireland)
- Operation Seagull I
- Operation Seagull II
- Operation Whale
- Operation Dove (Ireland)
- Operation Osprey
- Operation Sea Eagle
- Plan Kathleen
- Operation Mainau
- Operation Innkeeper

== See also ==
- Operation Green (Ireland)
- Irish Republican Army–Abwehr collaboration - main article on IRA-Nazi links

== Bibliography ==
- Hull, Mark M. (2003). Irish Secrets. German Espionage in Wartime Ireland 1939-1945. ISBN 978-0-7165-2756-5
- Stephan, Enno. (1963). Spies in Ireland. ISBN 1-131-82692-2 (Reprint).
