= Operation Whale =

World War II plans of the German Abwehr

Operation Whale ("Unternehmen Wal" or "Unternehmen Walfisch" in German) was the name of two separate German Intelligence (Abwehr) plans conceived in 1940.

- " Unternehmen Walfisch" was an aborted plan to land a seaplane on a lake in Ireland. Walfisch did not take place and planning was abandoned by July 1940.
- "Unternehmen Wal" was an aborted plan devised in November 1940 to establish contacts with Welsh and Scottish nationalist groups in Britain in preparation for Operation Sea Lion ("Unternehmen Seelöwe" in German).

The agent that was to undertake the mission was one of the Abwehr's Irish "experts", Helmut Clissmann. He was to be transported to Britain by Geistersegler (ghost sailor) Christian Nissen aka. "Hein Mück" or "Agent Hein". Planning for Whale took place when all Irish operations were prohibited by Abwehr chief Wilhelm Canaris. In order to work around the direct order not to interfere in Irish affairs, Abwehr Section leader Kurt Haller sought permission for an operation which had the stated aim of seeking assistance from Welsh and Scots groups although the outright aim was to seek further contacts with Ireland. Wal did not take place and planning was abandoned by April 1941.

== Notable Abwehr Operations involving Ireland ==
- Operation Green (Ireland)
- Operation Lobster
- Operation Lobster I
- Operation Seagull (Ireland)
- Operation Seagull I
- Operation Seagull II
- Operation Whale
- Operation Dove (Ireland)
- Operation Osprey
- Operation Sea Eagle
- Operation Mainau
- Operation Innkeeper

== See also ==
- IRA Abwehr World War II - Main article on IRA Nazi links
