= Operation Mainau =

World War II German espionage mission in Ireland

Operation Mainau (German: Unternehmen „Mainau“) was a German espionage mission during the Second World War. It was sanctioned and planned by the German secret service (Abwehr) and executed successfully in May 1940. The mission plan involved inserting Abwehr agent Hermann Görtz into Ireland by parachute.

Görtz successfully landed and established contact with his IRA contact "V-Held" (Agent Hero in German), real name Seamus "Jim" O'Donovan.

== Figures involved ==
Hermann Görtz was an Abwehr agent with a colourful past. He had already been detained on suspicion of espionage in Britain following his arrest on 8 November 1935. He was sentenced to prison in 1936 and released in February 1939. In Britain he had become notorious as "The Flying Spy" in the British media although his notoriety did not prevent his recall to service on 1 August 1939 during the German call up for World War II as a reserve second lieutenant. He had a number of functions in the German military before being assigned to the Lehr Regiment Brandenburg on 19 January 1940 under the command of Abwehr II.

Despite all the bad publicity he had generated for the Third Reich, Görtz somehow convinced his superiors that he would be qualified to infiltrate Ireland by parachute, establish contact with the IRA in Britain, and possibly start a "revolt" in Northern Ireland. A decision was taken by the Abwehr to send Görtz not to Britain, but to Ireland.

Abwehr knowledge about the political situation in Ireland was very sketchy. In preparation for his mission, Görtz did try to do some fact finding on Ireland via the office of Dr Franz Fromme. He is known to have contacted Francis Stuart and Nora O'Mara, with Stuart being described as "very helpful". He claimed to have established contact with expats from Northern Ireland living in Italy calling them the "Independent Group".

As far as is known, the only Irish contact names Görtz carried to Ireland were Seamus O'Donovan and that of Francis Stuart's wife, Iseult.

Capt. Wilhelm Kaupert, a reserve officer was adjutant at the operational airfield at Fritzlar near Cassell. His primary role was as photographic interpretation officer in the Commander in Chief's Reconnaissance Group but he was asked to organise Görtz's flight.

== Mission plan ==
The mission was directed against Northern Ireland. He was tasked with using resources gathered in the Republic of Ireland to:

1. Establish a secure communications link between Ireland and Germany
2. Consult the IRA on the prospect of a reconciliation between the Irish state and the IRA
3. Direct the military activities of the IRA towards British military targets, specifically naval installations
4. Report any incidental items of military importance

He was not authorised to interfere in Irish politics or threaten its neutrality. Görtz was to be unaccompanied on his mission. The attempt to insert him into Ireland was originally planned to take place in April but this was cancelled due to bad weather. In the interim, IRA chief of staff Stephen Hayes sent Plan Kathleen to Germany and Görtz was recalled to Berlin to look it over.

Görtz claimed after his capture that the dropzone for the mission was County Tyrone but this is probably a subterfuge concocted to indicate that he meant no mischief in neutral Ireland. He requested a poison capsule to take with him and this had to be cleared via the Abwehr chief Wilhelm Canaris. His codename was "Gilka".

He was not equipped with any of the material later spies sent to Ireland would carry, although he was given an Afu transmitter, a 9mm Browning pistol and some invisible ink ("G-Tinten").

== Insertion and contact with IRA ==
Görtz left Germany at 2100 hrs on 4 May 1940. He was piloted to Ireland aboard a He 111 medium bomber and he made the jump in bad weather from 1,500 metres. According to his postwar statement he claimed to have landed in a farm outside Trim, but his actual location was Ballivor, County Meath. His radio was lost during the jump, as was the shovel he had planned to bury his parachute with. He was wearing his full Luftwaffe parade dress.

Görtz was actually eighty miles from the house of Iseult Stuart in Laragh, County Wicklow.

He marched the entire distance asking for directions along the way, including at a Garda Siochana (police) station in Poulaphouca. Despite wearing full Luftwaffe parade dress, he was not detained. He reached Mrs. Stuart's house on 9 May. That night Görtz was collected by Seamus O'Donovan who took him to his home, "Florenceville", in Shankill, Dublin. He had successfully made contact with the IRA.

On 11 May he was moved by O'Donovan, Stephen Carroll Held, and Patrick McNeela to the home of J.J. O'Neill in Rathmines. During this he handed over $165,000 in American currency to the IRA and kept $10,000 for himself. Görtz stayed with the O'Neills until at least 19 May when he was moved to the custody of Stephen Held. Following this he was to meet with IRA supremo Stephen Hayes and remain on the loose in Ireland for a total of eighteen months.

Held's home was raided soon after the meeting with Hayes took place, (23 May). Papers and effects belonging to Görtz were seized including his parachute, various Luftwaffe identifying badges, German decorations from World War I, and data about Irish harbors and defence installations. Görtz was to remain at liberty, but the Abwehr, once they were told of events by the head of the German Legation, Eduard Hempel, considered Mainau to have failed. The Abwehr war diary records for 25 May:

According to a wireless report of the Stefani Agency [Italian news agency] and enemy broadcasts, "Operation Mainau" has been unsuccessful. According to them "Gilk" appears to have reached his destination. The transmitter [the Abwehr did not know Görtz had lost it], some items of equipment and the money which he took with him were apparently seized in the house of an Irish agent, through the latter's stupidity. Unfortunately this Irishman also had in his possession plans for a rebellion which had no connection with "Operation Mainau". There is no information as to "Gilka's" [sic] whereabouts. Even if he is not arrested in the near future, his further activity is rendered impossible in consequence of the discovery of the transmitter and the money. If he should eventually be arrested, Gilk is in a very difficult position in consequence of his equipment being found in the same place as the IRA plans. In consequence of the failure of "Operation Mainau" proposals for the parachuting of further agents are for the future to be disregarded.

The "IRA plans" referred to were Plan Kathleen — the plan Stephen Hayes had sent to Germany. Görtz says that after this first botched contact with the IRA he:

lived among people of my choice and never again under the protection of the IRA. I personally chose all the houses in which I hid or they were chosen for me by my friends. I carefully avoided any hide-out which had anything to do with the IRA. When I heard in one house that it had formerly been an IRA meeting place, I left it the same night. I realised that an agreement between the Irish government and the IRA was completely inopportune. The action against Held ruled out all hopes of bringing the IRA into association with the government. The Held episode had, however, a good side to it: I shook off the unwanted IRA protection. For the future, I was able to work with people whom I chose myself.

== Footnotes ==
=== Further information ===
- Before his death Görtz wrote a series of articles for the Irish Times titled "Mission to Ireland".
- Mark M. Hull, Irish Secrets. German Espionage in Wartime Ireland 1939-1945, 2003, ISBN 978-0-7165-2756-5
- Enno Stephan, Spies in Ireland, 1963, ISBN 1-131-82692-2 (reprint)
- J Bowyer Bell, The Secret Army - The IRA 1997 3rd Edition, ISBN 1-85371-813-0

== Notable Abwehr operations involving Ireland ==
- Operation Lobster
- Operation Lobster I
- Operation Seagull
- Operation Seagull I
- Operation Seagull II
- Operation Whale
- Operation Osprey
- Operation Sea Eagle
- Plan Kathleen
- Operation Green (Ireland)
- Operation Mainau
- Operation Innkeeper

== See also ==
- IRA Abwehr World War II - main article on IRA Nazi links
- Hermann Görtz
