= Hermann Görtz =

German spy (1890–1947)

- Hermann Görtz at the time of his capture
- Born: 15 November 1890; Lübeck, German Empire
- Died: 23 May 1947 (aged 56); Mercer's Hospital, Dublin, Ireland
- Cause of death: Suicide by cyanide poisoning
- Burial place: Glencree German War Cemetery, County Wicklow, Ireland
- Occupations: Spy; Pilot; Interrogator
- Known for: Spying in Britain and Ireland for Nazi Germany and liaising with the Irish Republican Army
- Spouse: Ellen Aschenborn
- Military career
- Allegiance: German Empire
- Service: Luftstreitkräfte
- Rank: Captain
- Conflicts: World War I; Eastern Front
- Awards: Iron Cross
- Espionage activity
- Allegiance: Nazi Germany
- Agency: Abwehr
- Service years: 1939-1941
- Rank: Major
- Codename: Gilka
- Operations: Operation Mainau

Hermann Görtz (also anglicised as Goertz; 15 November 1890 – 23 May 1947) was a German spy in Britain and Ireland before and during World War II, liaising with the Irish Republican Army (IRA). After the war, he committed suicide rather than be deported from Ireland to Germany.

== Background ==
Hermann Görtz was born in the port city of Lübeck in northern Germany on 15 November 1890. Few details are available about his service in World War I, but it is thought he fought on the Eastern Front against Russia before being wounded around Christmas 1914, later receiving the Iron Cross first class for valour.

He joined the Imperial German Air Service in 1915. He trained as a pilot and served as a reconnaissance officer, but after he showed a talent for interrogation of captured enemies, he was promoted to the rank of captain as an interrogations officer by the end of the war. Görtz served alongside Hermann Göring, who would go on to become head of the Luftwaffe. The most notable moment in Görtz's first military career seems to have come after the Armistice – it was said he was responsible for persuading Göring not to burn the planes in his squadron before the enemy forces impounded them.

Following the war, Görtz joined the Freikorps and married Ellen Aschenborn, the daughter of Admiral Richard Aschenborn. Görtz earned a doctorate in international law, which led to frequent travel abroad. It was during a trip to Ireland in 1927 that he developed an affection for the country. The visit may have been part of a study of the legal relationships forming between Ireland and the United Kingdom at that time. Görtz was known to show an interest in Irish politics; during conferences in America Görtz would converse with members of Clan na Gael, an Irish republican group based in the United States whose members opposed the Anglo-Irish Treaty. Görtz sympathised, viewing the treaty in the same light as the treaties imposed upon Germany at the time.

== First trip to Broadstairs ==
Hermann Görtz arrived in Britain on 29 August 1935 with a secretary, Marianne Emig. They spent a few weeks in Suffolk and eventually moved to Broadstairs and rented a house. There they befriended British airman Kenneth Lewis and through him began to collect information about the RAF Manston air base. Emig asked for letters of Royal Air Force stationery and photographs of the planes and aerial views.

When Lewis became concerned that he might be passing military information, she assured him that Britain and Germany would be on the same side in the next war. Lewis later testified that he was surprised at how much the couple already knew about the RAF.

Near the end of their six-week tenancy, Görtz visited Germany and telegraphed his landlady Mrs Johnson that he would be gone for two days, asking her to take care of his belongings in the outhouse, including his "bicycle combination". Görtz had meant his overalls, but Mrs Johnson thought he was referring to his Zündapp motorcycle.

Mrs Johnson checked the outhouse, did not find the motorbike and reported to police that it had disappeared. When police investigated the apparent theft, they found sketches and documents about Manston airfield. When Görtz returned to Britain three weeks later, police arrested him at Harwich. Emig had stayed behind in Germany.

Görtz was detained in Brixton Prison. Police accused him of offences against the Official Secrets Act (effectively for espionage). The trial at the Old Bailey began in March 1936 and attracted much publicity. Görtz pleaded not guilty and claimed the documents were part of his research for an intended book about the growth of the RAF. He intended to write the book to pay off his creditors. Marianne Emig refused to come to England to testify for Görtz's defence, fearing she would be tried as well.

According to evidence, including letters Görtz had sent his wife, it appeared that Görtz had been acting independently, possibly to impress the German intelligence service. He had already unsuccessfully applied for a position in the German Air Ministry. Further evidence also showed that he had been involved in the interrogation of Allied prisoners at the end of World War I.

Görtz was convicted and sentenced to four years of prison for espionage and sent to Maidstone Prison. In February 1939, he was released and deported to Germany. The Abwehr eventually did employ him and he reached the rank of major.

== Plan Kathleen ==
On 5 May 1940, Görtz parachuted into Ballivor, County Meath, Ireland (Operation Mainau) in an effort to gather information. He moved in with former IRA leader Jim O'Donovan. His mission was to act as a liaison officer with the IRA and enlist their assistance during a potential German occupation of Britain. On landing, he lost the "Ufa" transmitter he had parachuted with. Görtz hid his parachute and started walking (traveling only at night) while carrying $20,000 in cash. After several nights of walking he reached a safe house.

In Dublin, Görtz stayed at a safe house at 245 Templeogue Road in Templeogue and other properties during 19 months at liberty. These include houses in Spencer Villas, Glenageary; Charlemont Avenue, Dún Laoghaire; Nerano Road, Dalkey; Winton Avenue, Rathmines; and a period house in Shankill, County Dublin. He stayed for a month at Brittas Bay, and more briefly at Laragh Castle, Glendalough, County Wicklow, Fenit, County Kerry, and Mount Nugent, County Cavan. This was all facilitated in an underground IRA support system.

In May 1940, the Gardaí raided the home of an IRA member of German descent, Stephen Carroll Held, who had been working with Görtz, at his house at Blackheath Park, Clontarf. They confiscated a parachute, papers, Görtz's World War I medals, and a number of documents about the defence infrastructure of Ireland. The papers they took included files on possible military targets in Ireland, such as airfields and harbours, as well as details of Plan Kathleen – an IRA plan for the invasion of Northern Ireland with the support of the Nazi military. Held had brought this plan to Germany prior to Görtz's departure but his superiors had dismissed it as unfeasible.

Görtz went into hiding, staying with sympathizers in the Wicklow area and purposefully avoided contact with IRA safehouses. He remained at large for 18 months. When IRA member Pearse Paul Kelly visited Görtz's hiding place in Clontarf, Dublin on 27 November 1941, police arrested them both.

Görtz was interned in Mountjoy Prison then in Custume Barracks, Athlone where he remained with nine other German agents until release until after the war. He then lived in Glenageary and became secretary of the Save the German Children Society. He was rearrested the following year and served with a deportation order by the Minister for Justice. To prevent deportation he claimed to have been in the SS rather than a lieutenant in the Luftwaffe. This claim was disproved by Irish Military Intelligence (G2).

On Friday, 23 May 1947, he arrived at the Aliens' Office in Dublin Castle at 9.50 am and was told he was being deported to Germany the next day. Although it had been stated to him that the Irish government had specifically requested that he not be handed over to the Soviets, he committed suicide.

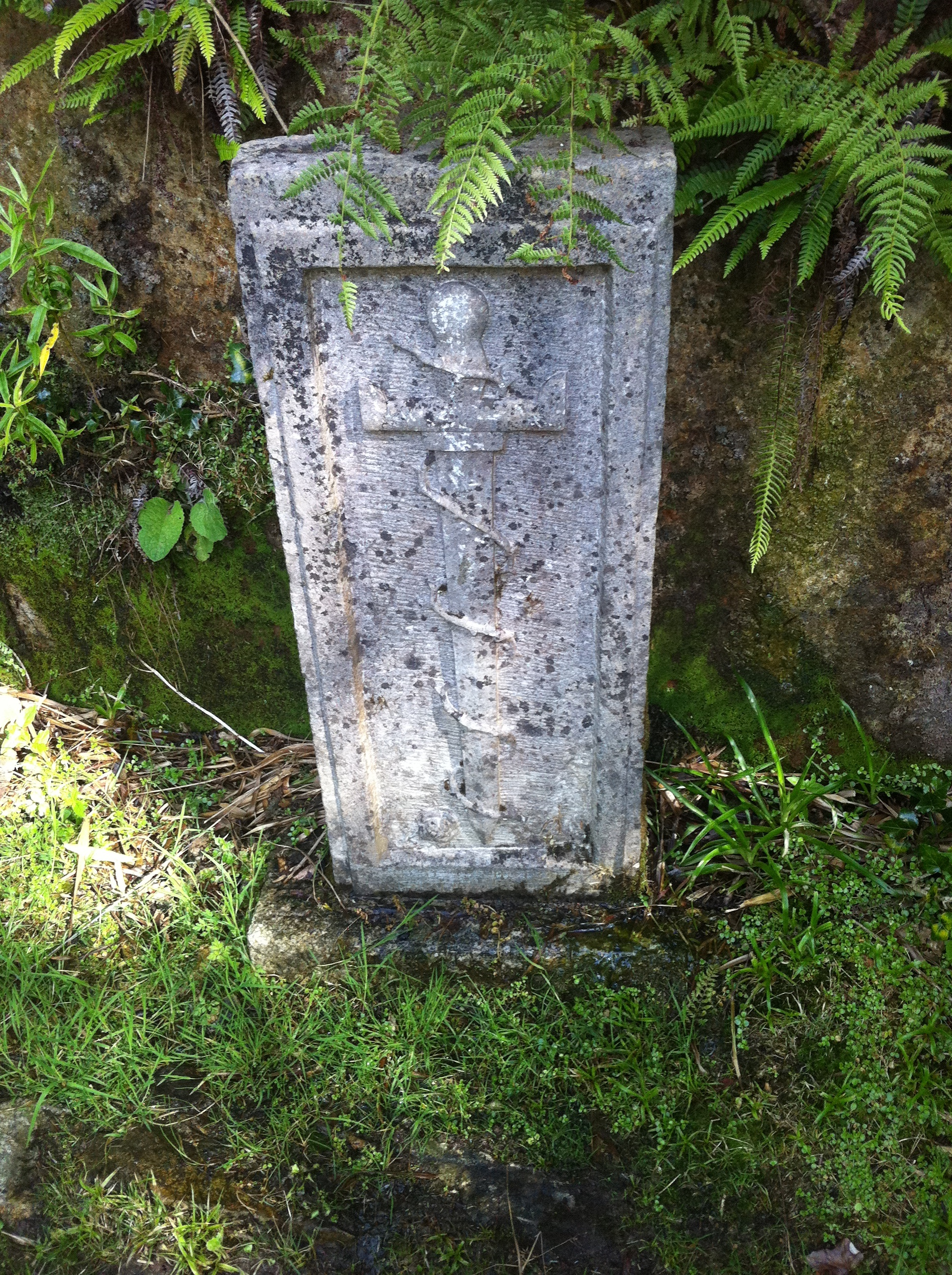
Hermann Görtz's grave in Glencree, County Wicklow

The Irish Times reported that he "stared disbelievingly at the detective officers. Then suddenly, he took his hand from his trouser pocket, swiftly removed his pipe from between his lips, and slipped a small glass phial into his mouth. One of the police officers sprang at Görtz as he crunched the glass with his teeth. The officer got his hands around Görtz's neck but failed to prevent most of the poison, believed to be prussic acid, from passing down his throat. Within a few seconds, Görtz collapsed." He died an hour later at Mercer's Hospital

Görtz was buried three days later in Dean's Grange Cemetery (Plot - St. Nessan G/12), his public funeral, which had a swastika flag draped over his coffin, was attended an accompaniment of Irish mourners including Dan Breen and Charles McGuinness.

In 1974 his remains were transferred to the German Military Cemetery, Glencree, County Wicklow.

== Media ==
In 1983, RTÉ made the dramatised television series Caught in a Free State about German spies in Ireland.

== See also ==
- Helmut Clissmann
- Irish Republican Army – Abwehr collaboration in World War II – Main article on IRA Nazi links
- The Emergency – the term used for World War II in neutral Ireland
