= Operation Sea Eagle =

Operation Sea Eagle ("Unternehmen Seeadler" in German) sometimes referred to as Operation Dove II ("Unternehmen Taube II" in German) was a German Foreign Ministry plan conceived in May 1941 after the collapse of planning around Operation Whale ("Unternehmen Walfisch" in German).

The operation was to involve landing a seaplane on a lake in Ireland to supply the Irish Republican Army (IRA) with operating funds and a transmitter.

== Planning ==
Planning for Sea Eagle took place while German Intelligence (Abwehr), and Abwehr/Foreign ministry dual role SS. Colonel Dr.Edmund Veesenmayer, feared an invasion of neutral Éire by American forces soon to be stationed in Northern Ireland. The Abwehr were to provide technical support for Sea Eagle and the Foreign Ministry was to retain operational control. This was largely because every mission to Ireland so far undertaken had been a complete disaster. On 23 June 1941, the day after the planned invasion of the USSR, Operation Barbarossa, it was decided that all future operations to Ireland would be carried out only with the express approval of Dr. Veesenmayer.

The agents initially selected for the task were Abwehr Ireland "expert" Helmut Clissman, and Bruno Rieger. At a later date, Frank Ryan was added when the mission expanded to include a direct liaison with the IRA.

It was hoped that with the availability of a long-range transmitter, the IRA would radio back wireless reports for the Luftwaffe as the Irish government had raised objections to the use of the radio at the German Legation in Dublin. This implies that there was no existing link operating between the IRA and Germany despite agent Hermann Görtz still being at large.

The best time for the mission was projected to be between 15 and 25 September 1941. Veesenmayer had consulted with Oberstleutnant von Harlinghausen of the Luftwaffe and decided that the Heinkel He 59 seaplane was to be used. The seaplane would cut its engine on descent and glide in to land on the lake. The personnel would make landfall via a rubber dinghy, and carry folding bicycles for transport. The Brandon Bay area in County Kerry was decided to be the best location.

== Mission objectives ==
Military tasks:

1. Establish a liaison with the IRA and re-activate their sabotage operations in Britain, (the failed IRA S-Plan Campaign of 1939), also to give them operating funds.
2. Establish radio communications with Germany via a transmitter.
3. Transmit military information, including weather reports.
4. Prepare an underground resistance in the event of Ireland's reoccupation by British troops or invasion by American troops.

Political tasks:

1. Bring about an "understanding" between Éamon de Valera and the IRA.
2. Influence the attitudes and policies of Ireland's domestic and external situation through objective reporting.
3. In the event of Ireland's occupation by Britain or the U.S. to organize resistance thereby tying down enemy forces to the greatest possible extent.

Veesenmayer's plan was shown to Führer Adolf Hitler with a recommendation from Foreign Minister Joachim von Ribbentrop on 6 September 1941. Hitler decided to postpone the operation with the note of possibly delaying it until October, or even December of that year. The plan was eventually abandoned entirely as was planning involving No.1 SS. Special Service Troop as the feared invasion never materialised.

== See also ==
- IRA Abwehr World War II

== Further information and sources ==
- Mark M. Hull (2003). Irish Secrets. German Espionage in Wartime Ireland 1939-1945. ISBN 978-0-7165-2756-5.
- Enno Stephan (1963). Spies in Ireland. ISBN 1-131-82692-2. (reprint)
- J Bowyer Bell (1997). The Secret Army - The IRA. ISBN 1-85371-813-0. (3rd Edition)
