= Rocket U-boat =

Series of WW2 German military projects

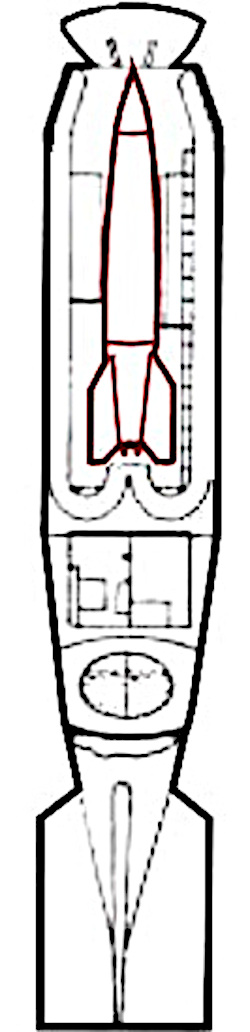
Sketch of V-2 rocket in launch position in the towed submarine barge Prüfstand XII. Note the control room and liquid oxygen storage underneath the rocket.

The Rocket U-boat was a series of military projects undertaken by Nazi Germany during the Second World War. The projects, which were undertaken at Peenemünde Army Research Center, aimed to develop submarine-launched rockets, flying bombs and missiles. The Kriegsmarine (German Navy) did not use submarine-launched rockets or missiles from U-boats against targets at sea or ashore. These projects never reached combat readiness before the war ended.

From May 31 to June 5, 1942, a series of underwater-launching experiments of solid-fuel rockets were carried out using submarine U-511 as a launching platform. The rocket system was first envisaged as a weapon against convoy escorts but with no effective guidance system, the arrangement was ineffective against moving targets and could only be used for shore bombardment. Development of this system ended in early 1943 because it decreased the U-boats' seaworthiness.

Plans for the rocket U-boat involved an attack on New York City using newly invented V-2 rockets; Unmanned and unpowered containers with V-2 rockets inside were to be towed within range of the target by a conventional U-boat then set up and launched from its gyro-stabilized platform. With thoughts of hitting targets in the United States and in the United Kingdom, a 32 m (105 ft)-long container of 500-tons displacement was to be towed behind a submerged U-boat. The evacuation of Peenemünde in February 1945 brought an end to these developments. There are no records that these were tested with a rocket launch before Germany's final defeat. It is the forerunner and basis of modern ballistic missile submarines. After the war, the United States and the Soviet Union continued these projects with the assistance of captured German scientists. The US Navy fired Republic-Ford JB-2 flying bombs – reverse engineered versions of the German V-1 flying bomb – from submarines USS Cusk (SS-348) and USS Carbonero (SS-337) in a series of successful tests between 1947 and 1951. During Operation Sandy, a German V-2 rocket seized by the US Army was launched from the upper deck of the aircraft carrier USS Midway (CV-41) on September 6, 1947. In the Soviet Union, German scientists contributed to the development of GOLEM-1, a liquid-fueled rocket based on the V-2 rocket design and designed to be launched from a submarine-towed capsule.

== Background ==
The British Area Bombing Directive issued on February 14, 1942, focused on undermining "the morale of the enemy civil population and in particular the industrial workers". According to British philosopher A. C. Grayling, Lübeck, with its timbered medieval buildings, was chosen because the Royal Air Force (RAF) Air Staff "were eager to experiment with a bombing technique using a high proportion of incendiaries" to help them carry out the directive. The RAF was aware of using a high proportion of incendiaries during bombing raids was effective because cities such as Coventry had been subject to such attacks by the Luftwaffe during the Blitz. New heavy bombers, improved navigation and bombing systems, and new tactics led to a devastating increase in the effectiveness of the RAF's bombing offensive on Germany, starting with the bombing of Lübeck in March 1942. A series of follow-up attacks using a similar pattern, was mounted against Rostock between April 24 and 27, 1942.

The destruction of Lübeck and Rostock came as a profound shock to the German leadership and population. Adolf Hitler was enraged and on April 14, 1942, he ordered "that the air war against England be given a more aggressive stamp. Accordingly, when targets are being selected, preference is to be given to those where attacks are likely to have the greatest possible effect on civilian life. Besides raids on ports and industry, terror attacks of a retaliatory nature [Vergeltungsangriffe] are to be carried out on towns other than London". In April and May 1942, the Luftwaffe designed the Baedeker Raids on British cities with the hope of forcing the Royal Air Force to reduce their actions. The Luftwaffe continued to target cities for their cultural value for the next two years. The Baedeker-type raids ended in 1944 as the Germans realized they were ineffective; unsustainable losses were being suffered for no material gain. January 1944 saw a switch to London as the principal target for retaliation. On January 21, the Luftwaffe mounted Operation Steinbock, an all-out attack on London using all of its available bomber force in the west. This too was largely a failure and German efforts were redirected toward the ports the Germans suspected were going to be used for the Allied invasion of Germany. Operation Steinbock was the last large-scale bombing campaign against England using conventional aircraft; thenceforth only the V-1 flying bomb and V-2 rockets – pioneering examples of cruise missiles and short-range ballistic missiles respectively – were used to strike British cities. The V-1 flying bomb – a pulsejet-powered cruise missile – and the V-2 rocket, a liquid-fueled ballistic missile, were long-range "retaliatory weapons" (German:Vergeltungswaffen) designed for strategic bombing, particularly terror bombing and the aerial bombing of cities, as retaliation for the Allied bombings against German cities.

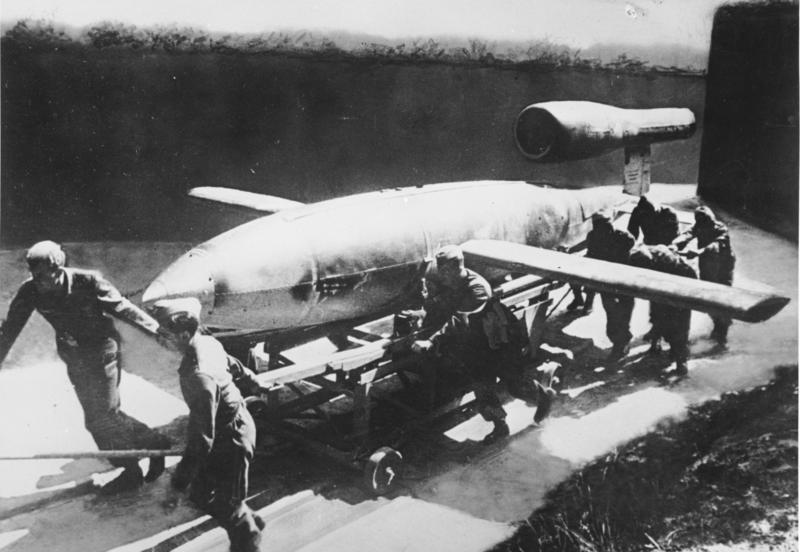
Cruise missile Fieseler Fi 103 ("Vergeltungswaffe V 1") is rolled to the launch site by German soldiers (1944)

In May 1942, following the relative failure of the Baedeker Raids, the development of flying bombs and rockets to target Britain accelerated. The V-1 flying bomb, which was developed by the Luftwaffe at Peenemünde Army Research Center, was the first of the so-called "Vengeance weapons" series. In July 1943, the V-1 flew 245 km (152 miles) and impacted within 1 km (0.62 miles) of its target. Ground-launched V-1s were propelled up a 49-m (160 ft)-long, inclined launch ramp consisting of eight modular sections 6 m (20 ft) long and a muzzle brake, to enable the missile to become airborne with an airflow strong enough to allow the pulse-jet engine to operate. The steam catapult accelerated the V-1 to a launch speed of 200 mph (320 km/h), well above the minimum operational speed of 150 mph (240 km/h). Its operational range was about 200 km (150 mi) and its maximum speed was about 640 km/h (400 mph).

Schematic diagram of a V-2 rocket

The V-2 rocket, with the technical name Aggregat 4 (A-4) – the world's first long-range guided ballistic missile – was developed by Wernher von Braun. The first successful test flight of a V-2 rocket took place on October 3, 1942; it reached an altitude of 84.5 kilometres (52.5 miles). The missile was powered by a liquid-propellant rocket engine and used a 75% ethanol/25% water mixture for fuel and liquid oxygen for oxidizer. The fuel and oxidizer pumps were driven by a steam turbine, and the steam was produced using concentrated hydrogen peroxide with sodium permanganate as a catalyst.

At launch, the V-2 rocket propelled itself for up to 65 seconds and a programmed motor held the inclination at the specified angle until engine shutdown, after which the rocket continued on a ballistic free-fall trajectory. The rocket reached a height of 80 km (50 mi) after shutting off the engine. Unlike the V-1, the V-2's speed and trajectory made it practically invulnerable to anti-aircraft guns and fighters as it dropped from an altitude of 100–110 km (62–68 mi) at approximately 3,550 km/h (2,210 mph) – up to three times the speed of sound at sea level. Its operational range was about 320 km (200 mi).

On May 26, 1943, Germany decided to put both the V-1 and the V-2 into production. On September 29, 1943, Albert Speer publicly promised retribution against the mass bombing of German cities using a "secret weapon". On June 24, 1944, the Propagandaministerium (Reich Propaganda Ministry) announcement of the Vergeltungswaffe 1 guided missile implied there would be another such weapon.

== Development ==
During World War II, several projects were undertaken by the German Navy at Peenemünde Army Research Center to develop submarine-launched rockets, flying bombs and missiles. These projects never reached combat readiness before the war ended and the German Navy did not use submarine-launched rockets or missiles.

=== Short-range rockets ===
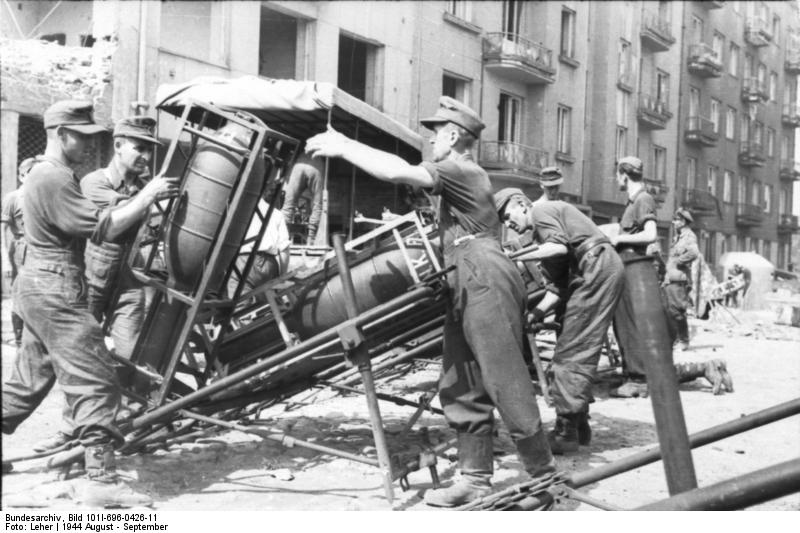
Wurfgerät 42 "Nebelwerfer", here during the Warsaw Uprising in 1944, similar to the rocket launchers installed on U-511.

According to Walter Dornberger, Ernst Steinhoff, the Director for Flight Mechanics, Ballistics, Guidance Control, and Instrumentation at Peenemünde Army Research Center, whose brother Kapitänleutnant Friedrich Steinhoff commanded the U-boat U-511, originated the idea of launching solid-propellant rockets from a submerged submarine. Ernst Steinhoff was in charge of working on submarine launched rockets.

Tubular metal launch frames (Schwere Wurfgerät 41 (sWG 41)) carrying six 30 cm Wurfkörper 42 rockets were mounted on the submarine's upper deck with a 45° firing angle. From May 31 to June 5, 1942, under the code name "Project Ursel", a series of solid-fuel rocket launching experiments were carried out using submarine U-511 as a launching platform near the Greifswalder Oie.

Successful firings from the surface were carried out on June 4, 1942, and from up to 15 m (49 ft) underwater with no effect on the missiles' accuracy. The rocket system was first envisaged as a weapon against convoy escorts but with no effective guidance system, the arrangement was ineffective against moving targets and could only be used for shore bombardment. The development of this system ended in early 1943 because it was found to decrease the U-boats' seaworthiness.

From 1944 to 1945, the German Navy continued to develop and successfully tested various short-range rockets that could be launched from submerged submarines at depths of up to 100 m (330 ft) at the naval testing station operated by the Torpedoversuch Anstalt Eckernförde at Lake Toplitz near Bad Aussee, Austria. No official records on the deployment of these short-range rockets on German U-boats or their use against targets have been found.

The first recorded attack on land-based targets using sea-based rockets was carried out by the US submarine USS Barb (SS-220) on June 22, 1944, against the Japanese town Shari. The USS Barb fired 12 5-inch rockets Mk 10 Mod 0, from 4,700 yd (4.3 km) offshore, using a rocket launcher Mk 51 Mod 0 installed on the deck of the submarine.

=== V-1 flying bombs ===
In 1943, interest in the concept of sea-launched missiles was revived with the advent of the V-1 flying bomb; proposals were made to mount a V-1 and steam-operated launcher on a U-boat to strike targets at a much greater range than the 150 mi (240 km) that was possible from land-based sites. This proposal foundered because of inter-service rivalry; the V-1 was a Luftwaffe project.

In September 1944, the Allies received intelligence reports suggesting Germany's Kriegsmarine was planning to use submarine-launched V-1s to attack cities on the east coast of the United States. A modified German submarine was spotted in a southern Norwegian port "showing a pair of rails extending from conning tower to the bow and terminating at a flat, rectangular surface", apparently modified to launch V-1s. No official records on the deployment of V-1 flying bombs on German U-boats have yet been found.

=== V-2 rockets ===
In Autumn 1943, Deutsche Arbeitsfront director Bodo Lafferentz proposed to Dornberger the idea of a towable, watertight container that could hold a V-2 rocket. The project of sea-beased V-2 rockets was code-named "Apparat F"' and the development of towable containers was commonly referred to by the codename Prüfstand XII from late 1944. The container was unmanned and unpowered, and was intended to be towed into range of its target by a U-boat then set up and launched from its gyro-stabilized platform. A report of the Peenemünde research center dated January 19, 1945, summarized the objectives of Prüfstand XII:

This project opens up the possibility of attacking, with the Apparat F, off enemy coasts (for example, northern England or eastern America), very distant but strategically important targets that are currently out of range. In addition, it deceives the adversary about the real range of the missile and, at additional costs, offers new strategic and political opportunities.

Important rocket scientists such as Klaus Riedel, Hans Hüter, Bernhard Tessman and Georg von Tiesenhausen were assigned to the project.

Once in the firing position, the container's upper ballasts would be remotely emptied to reorient it from its horizontal towing position to its vertical launching position, with its bow emerging about 5 m (16 ft) above the surface. The container was stabilized using large rudders and was steered by a gyroscopic system. A three-person service team would leave the submarine in an inflatable boat while the firing control unit remained on board the submarine. The operators would open a hinged lid at the bow of the container to access to a servicing platform and connect the container to the submarine to power it. They would prepare the warhead and fuel the missile with liquid oxygen, ethanol and sodium permanganate for the turbopump from fuel tanks located in the container. The missile was prepared for launch from a service room located beneath the missile chamber. The V-2 would have been guided by rails and the empty space would accommodate the ballasts. The exhaust jet was deflected 180° using collecting funnels so the jet could exit upward. This deflection would reduce the rocket thrust and its radius of action of a sea-based V-2 rocket, requiring the u-boat to come dangerously close to the coast. The armed missile would have been ready to launch 30 minutes after reaching its firing position. After the launch, the container could be abandoned or towed back to the base.

Initial calculations showed at any one time, a U-boat could tow three submerged containers at periscope depth and at a speed of 5 kn (9.3 km/h; 5.8 mph) An attack on US targets would require a 30-day journey to the launching position at an average speed of 10–12 knots (19–22 km/h; 12–14 mph). Type XXI U-boats, with a range of 15,500 nautical miles (28,700 km; 17,800 mi) at 10 knots (19 km/h; 12 mph) surfaced and 340 nmi (630 km; 390 mi) at 5 knots (9.3 km/h; 5.8 mph) submerged, were considered to be ideal submarines to perform such attacks on the US.

Problems in the development of the V-2 delayed this project until November 1944. In January 1945, Dornberger submitted over a hundred detailed draft designs. A 300-ton prototype was built by Schichau-Werke GmbH. At the beginning of 1945, successful underwater towing trials were carried out with U-boat 1063.

Although its design never reached the prototype stage, the Peenemünde engineers considered using the A-8 version of the V-2 rocket; this was a "stretched" variant that had a longer radius of action, and used nitric acid oxidizer and kerosene propellants pressurized with nitrogen if the losses of hydrogen peroxide could not be kept under 1% per day as planned. The A-8 variant called for 32 m (105 ft)-long containers weighing 500 tons. Under the code-name Projekt Schwimmweste ("Project Lifejacket"), confidential reports dated January 3, 1945, and January 19, 1945, indicate the Stetinner Vulkanwerft ("Vulkan Docks") was contracted to build three containers in Stetin by March 1945 and that four test firings with different firing configurations were planned.

The evacuation of Peenemünde in February 1945 and the fall of Stettin to the Red Army in April 1945 brought an end to these developments, and there are no records these designs were tested with a rocket launch before Germany's final collapse. The fate of the containers after the war is uncertain. According to some sources, Soviet forces captured incomplete capsules and design information. The project may have continued with the assistance of German scientists, and led to the development of GOLEM-1, a liquid-fueled rocket based on the V-2 and designed to be launched from a submarine-towed capsule. According to Michael J. Neufeld, although generously described as a forerunner of the ballistic missile submarines, the idea of launching V2-rockets from canisters towed across the Atlantic Ocean by U-boats embodied the mood of desperation of Nazi Germany at the end of World War II, concluding; "it is hard to see how a few [V-2 rocket attacks on New York] would have done anything but make Americans more determined to take revenge on German cities". Frederick Ira Ordway III and Michael Sharpe considered this project "became a part of the history that may have been, given more time".

== Fears of rocket attacks on U.S. ==
Rumors of missile-armed submarines operating from Bergen with New York as the target – including one from Denmark and one from Sweden passed on by the Supreme Headquarters Allied Expeditionary Force – emerged at the end of 1944. . The British Admiralty discounted these reports and assessed while V-1s could be potentially mounted on Type IX submarines, the Germans were unlikely to devote scarce resources to such a project. In May 1945, the American press reported an attempted attack on New York on November 7, 1944 – the day of the presidential election – using a "jet-propelled or rocket-propelled weapon" launched from submarines. The US Navy said the report of the submarine attack was "without foundation"'.

On November 29, 1944, German spies William Colepaugh and Erich Gimpel were landed in Maine by the Type IXC/40 U-boat U-1230 to gather intelligence on U.S. military and technology facilities. Colepaugh was arrested on December 6; during his interrogation, Colepaugh said German U-boats were being equipped with long-range rocket launchers. Supposedly, U-1230 was shadowed by a U-boat pack equipped with V-weapons with the intention of attacking New York City and Washington D.C. Although the U.S. took the threat seriously, it never materialized and Colepaugh's claim was later disproven.

The Atlantic Fleet's commander Vice Admiral Jonas H. Ingram gave a press conference on January 8, 1945; he warned there was a threat of a missile attack and announced a large force had been assembled to counter seaborne missile launchers. In January 1945, German Minister of Armaments and War Production Albert Speer made a propaganda broadcast in which he said V-1s and V-2s "would fall on New York by February 1, 1945", increasing the U.S. Government's concern over the threat of attack.

In response to this threat, the U.S. Navy conducted Operation Teardrop between April and May 1945 to sink German U-boats detected heading for the Eastern Seaboard, which were believed to be armed with V-1s or V-2s. Five of the seven Type IX submarines that stationed off the U.S. were sunk; four with their entire crews. Thirty-three U-546 crew members were captured. Following the end of the war in Europe, the submarines U-234, U-805, U-858 and U-1228 surrendered at sea before returning to bases on the U.S. east coast.

After the German surrender, the U.S. Navy continued its efforts to determine whether the U-boats had carried missiles. The crews of U-805 and U-858 were interrogated and confirmed their U-boats were not fitted with missile-launching equipment. Kapitänleutnant Fritz Steinhoff, who had commanded U-511 during her rocket trials and was captured at sea when he surrendered U-873, was subjected to an abusive interrogation at Portsmouth by the interviewers of U-546's crew. On May 19, 1945, Steinhoff bled to death in his Boston jail cell from wrist wounds that may have been self-inflicted with the broken lens of his sunglasses. It is not known whether the Allies were aware of Steinhoff's involvement in the rocket trials. Six months after Steinhoff's death, his brother Ernst Steinhoff became one of the Operation Paperclip rocket scientists from Peenemünde who arrived in the U.S. to work at White Sands Missile Range.

== Post-war developments ==
=== Soviet Union ===
After the war, Western experts were convinced the Soviet Union had developed the sea-going GOLEM 1 rocket from the V-2 rocket. The underwater-to-surface GOLEM-1, which was developed with the assistance of German scientists, is believed to have been a nuclear-capable, liquid-fueled (oxygen and alcohol), radio-inertial-guided rocket designed to be launched from a capsule towed by a submarine. The GOLEM-1 was a 53.8-foot (16.4 m) long rocket with a diameter of 5.41 ft (1.65 m) and a range of 395 mi (636 km). Two or three GOLEM-1 missiles could be towed in capsules by submerged submarines.

The Soviet submarine B-67, a converted Project 611 (Zulu-IV class) submarine, in the White Sea on September 16, 1955, at 17:32, launched an R-11FM (SS-N-1 Scud-A), the naval variant of the R-11 Zemlya (SS-1b Scud-A); the first submarine-launched ballistic missile that was modeled on the Wasserfall, the anti-aircraft version of the V-2 rocket and was developed by engineer Victor Makeev. The missiles were too long to be contained in the submarine's hull and extended into the enlarged sail. To be fired, the submarine had to surface and raise the missile out of the sail. Five additional Project V611 and AV611 (Zulu-V class) submarines became the world's first operational ballistic-missile submarines with two R-11FM missiles each, entering service in 1956–57. Six Zulu-class submarines that were successfully modified to carry and launch three R-11FM missiles became known by their NATO reporting name of Golf class.

Following this initial success, the R-11FM was further developed and the first underwater launch of a modified R-11FM rocket using solid instead of liquid fuel took place on December 26, 1956, from an immersed platform at a depth of 30 m (98 ft). With a range of 150 km (93 miles) and a payload of 967 kg (2,132 lb), the R-11FM rocket officially entered service in the Navy on February 20, 1959. The Soviet Union made its first successful underwater launch of a submarine ballistic missile in the White Sea on September 10, 1960, from the same converted Project 611 submarine that first launched the R-11FM.

=== United States ===
During Operation Sandy, for the first time, a German V-2 rocket seized in Germany by the U.S. Army at the end of the war was launched from a ship at sea, several hundred miles south of Bermuda. The launch took place on September 6, 1947, from the upper deck of the aircraft carrier USS Midway (CV-41). The first sea-based launch of a missile by the U.S. Navy occurred on February 12, 1947, from the upper deck of the submarine USS Cusk (SS-348). Codenamed "Loon", a naval version of the Republic-Ford JB-2, a reversed-engineered copy of the German V-1 flying bomb was successfully launched off Point Mugu, California. The JB-2 "Loon" was developed to be carried in watertight containers mounted on the aft deck of submarines. USS Carbonero (SS-337) was modified to provide mid-course guidance for JB-2 "Loon". These successful tests led to the development of submarine-launched cruise missiles. The U.S. Navy's success in adapting a variant of the V-1 to be launched from submarines also demonstrated the technically feasibility of the development by the German navy.

Seabased launch of JB-2 "Loon" cruise missiles by the US Navy
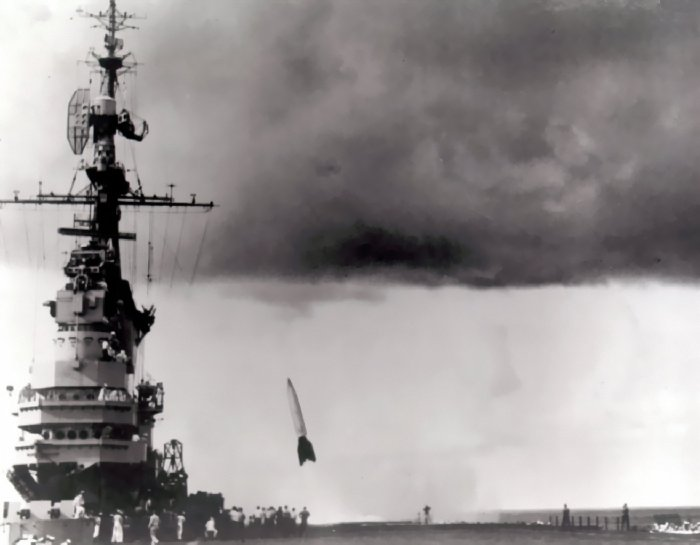
Launch of a captured V-2 rocket from deck of the U.S. Navy aircraft carrier USS Midway (CVB-41) during "Operation Sandy", September 6, 1947

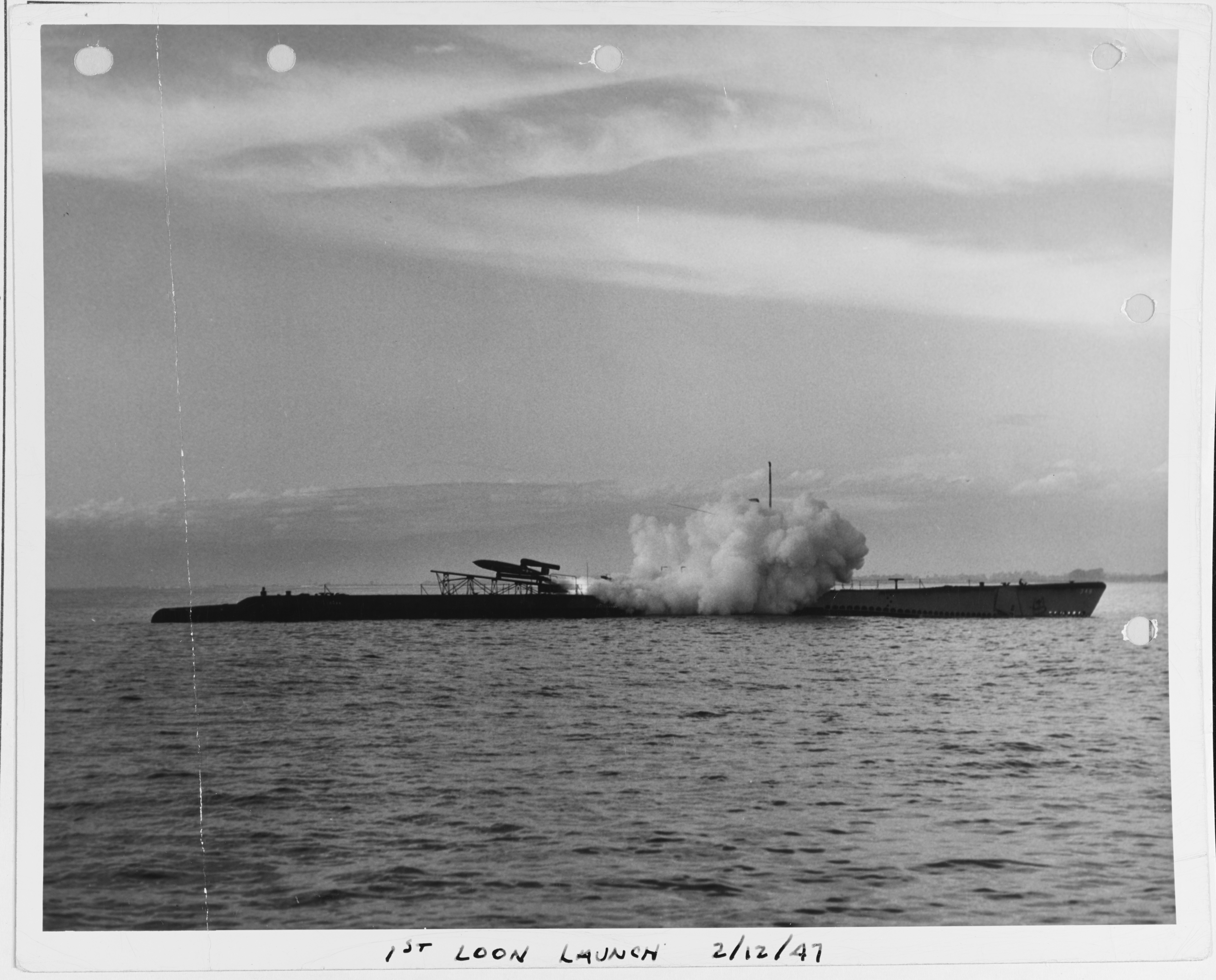
First launching on February 2, 1947, off Point Mugu, California, from USS Cusk of an LTV-N-2 Loon missile, a US copy of the German V-1 flying bomb

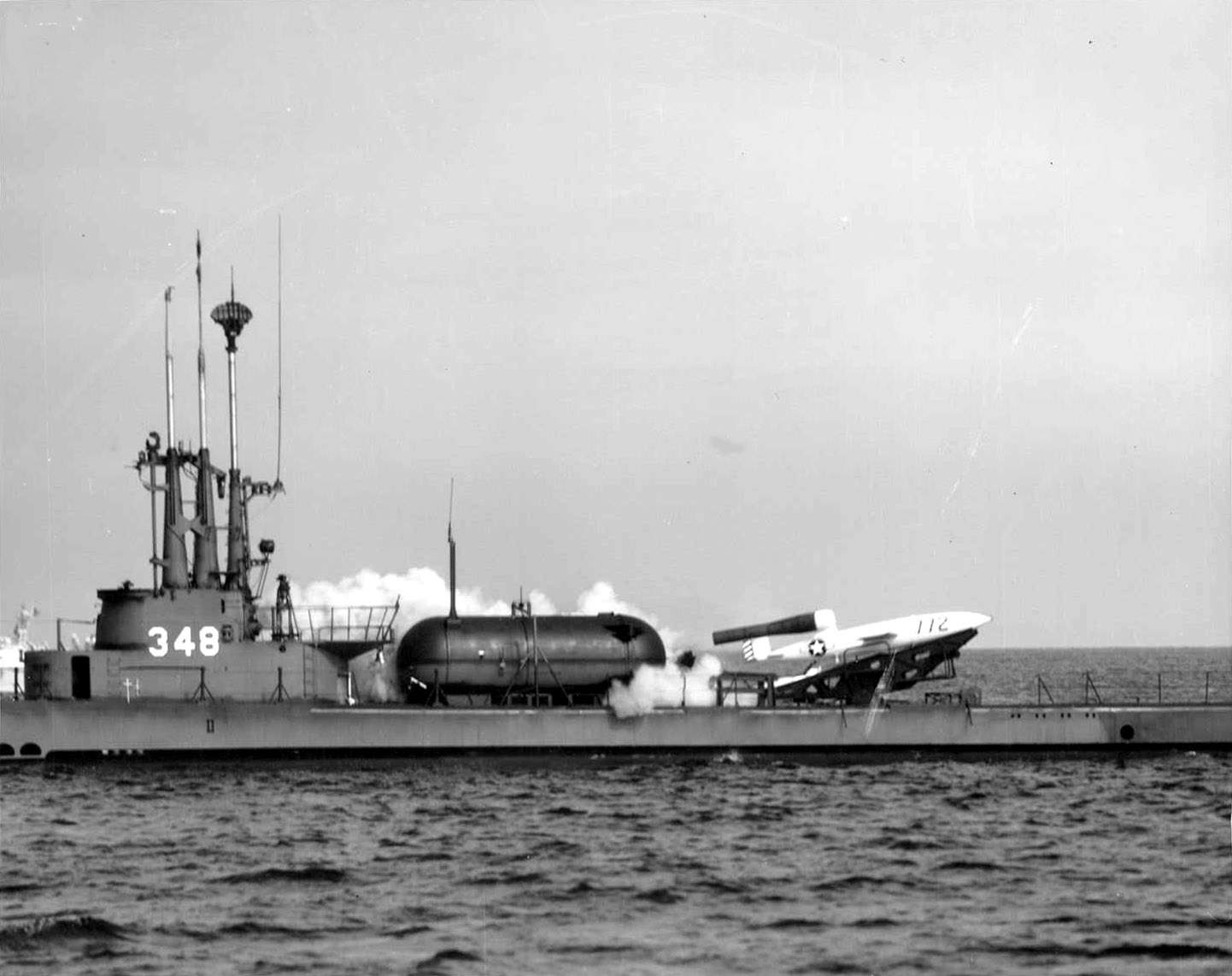
A JB-2 "Loon" being fired from USS Cusk in 1951

By 1953, the USS Tunny had been adapted into a true missile submarine but it was still an awkward process to launch the Regulus cruise missile, a nuclear-capable turbojet-powered, second-generation cruise missile that developed from the tests conducted with the German V-1 flying bomb. The submarine had to surface and the missile was manually loaded from storage onto a launch rail on the submarine's deck before it could be launched. The U.S.'s first operational ballistic missile submarine, USS George Washington, standing out into the Atlantic Missile Test Range, successfully conducted the first UGM-27 Polaris missile launch from a submerged submarine on July 20, 1960, establishing the nuclear deterrent role for missile submarines.

In March 2010, Deputy Secretary of Defense William J. Lynn III, in a speech on missile defense, stated:

Although Project Laffarenz [sic] did not come to fruition, it illustrates how our adversaries will always be reaching for new and ingenious ways to cause us harm. Their tactics may make straightforward use of weapons systems we are prepared to defend against. But they may also marry high and low technologies in unexpected combinations, forcing us to quickly adapt.

== See also ==
- USS Barb (SS-220)
- Japanese I-400-class submarine aircraft carrier
- Japanese Type AM submarine aircraft carrier
- Sea Dragon (rocket)

== Bibliography ==
- Blair, Clay (1998). Hitler's U-Boat War. The Hunters, 1942–1945 (Modern Library ed.). New York: Random House. ISBN 0-679-64033-9.
- Boog, Horst (2001). The Global War. Germany and the Second World War. Vol. VI. Oxford University Press. p. 565. ISBN 978-0-19-822888-2.
- Brooks, Geoffrey (2008). Hitler's Terror Weapons: From VI to Vimana. Pen & Sword Books. ISBN 978-1-78337-933-0.
- Breuer, William B. (2003). The air-raid warden was a spy and other tales from home-front America in World War II. Hoboken, N.J. Chichester: Wiley. ISBN 978-0-471-23488-3.
- Collier, Basil (1976). The Battle of the V-weapons, 1944–45. Elmfield Press. ISBN 978-0-7057-0070-2.
- Dornberger, Walter (1958). V-2: The Nazi Rocket Weapon. Viking Press. ISBN 978-0-345-06273-4.
- Duffy, James P. (2004). "U-boats to America". Target America : Hitler's plan to attack the United States. Westport, Conn.: Praeger. ISBN 0-275-96684-4. OCLC 53476807.
- Georg, Friedrich (2003). Hitler's Miracle Weapons: The Luftwaffe and Kriegsmarine. Helion. ISBN 978-1-874622-91-8. Archived from the original on January 22, 2021.
- Georg, Friedrich; Mehner, Thomas (2004). Atomziel New York : geheime Grossraketen- und Raumfahrtprojekte des Dritten Reiches [Atomic Target New York: Secret Large Rocket and Space Projects of the Third Reich] (in German). Rottenburg: Kopp. ISBN 978-3-930219-91-9.
- Grayling, A. C. (2006). Among the Dead Cities: Was the Allied Bombing of Civilians in WWII a Necessity or a Crime?. London: Bloomsbury Publishing. ISBN 978-0-7475-7671-6. OCLC 1391179967. OL 22239519M. Wikidata Q136472797.
- Griehl, Manfred (2006). "Rocket attack". Luftwaffe over America : the secret plans to bomb the United States in World War II. London: Greenhill. ISBN 0-7607-8697-6. OCLC 156852663.
- Hahn, Fritz (1998). Waffen und Geheimwaffen des deutschen Heeres 1933–1945 (in German). Bonn: Bernard und Graefe. ISBN 978-3-89555-128-4.
- Hastings, Max (1979). Bomber Command. Pan Books. ISBN 0-330-39204-2.
- Henshall, Philip (1985). Hitler's Rocket Sites. New York: St. Martin's Press. p. 128. ISBN 978-0-312-38822-5.
- Henshall, Philip (2000). The Nuclear axis : Germany, Japan and the atom bomb race, 1939–1945. Stroud, Gloucestershire: Sutton Pub. ISBN 0-7509-2293-1.
- Johnson, David (1982). V-1, V-2: Hitler's Vengeance on London. Stein and Day. ISBN 0-8128-2858-5.
- Köberl, Markus (1990). "Das Projekt "Ursel"". Der Toplitzsee: wo Geschichte und Sage zusammentreffen (in German). ÖBV. ISBN 978-3-215-07491-2. Archived from the original on February 21, 2021.
- Klee, Ernst; Merk, Otto (1965). The Birth of the Missile: The Secrets of Peenemünde. Dutton. Archived from the original on February 21, 2021.
- Lawton, Paul M. (November 18, 2019). Hitler's Raketen U-Boote (Rocket Submarines) : the true story of the Steinhoff Brothers and the Nazi's first submarine launched missiles : the untold New England U-Boat saga and murder mystery. Brockton, MA. ISBN 978-1-938394-39-3. OCLC 1198434716.
- Lundeberg, Philip K. (1994). "Operation Teardrop Revisited". In Runyan, Timothy J.; Copes, Jan M (eds.). To Die Gallantly : The Battle of the Atlantic. Boulder: Westview Press. ISBN 0-8133-8815-5.
- Miller, David (2000). U-boats : history, development and equipment 1914–1945. London: Conway Maritime Press. ISBN 0-85177-790-2.
- Miller, Robert A. (2013). A true story of an American Nazi spy : William Curtis Colepaugh. Trafford Publishing. ISBN 978-1-4669-8220-8. OCLC 828892911.
- Neufeld, Michael J. (1995). The Rocket and the Reich. Peenemünde and the Coming of the Ballistic Missile Era. New York: The Free Press. ISBN 0-02-922895-6.
- Ordway, Frederick Ira; Sharpe, Mitchell R. (1979). The Rocket Team. Crowell. ISBN 978-0-690-01656-7.
- Parry, Albert (1960). Russia's Rockets and Missiles. Doubleday.
- Paterson, Lawrence (2009). Black flag : the surrender of Germany's U-boat forces. Minneapolis, Minn.: Zenith Press. ISBN 978-0-7603-3754-7. OCLC 308175284.
- Polmar, Norman; Moore, Kenneth J. (2004). Cold War Submarines: The Design and Construction of U.S. and Soviet Submarines. Potomac Books, Inc. ISBN 978-1-57488-594-1. Archived from the original on August 19, 2020.
- Polmar, Norman; White, Michael (November 29, 2010). Project Azorian: The CIA and the Raising of the K-129. Naval Institute Press. ISBN 978-1-59114-690-2. Archived from the original on June 26, 2014.
- Prag, Christian (April 16, 2009). No Ordinary War: The Eventful Career of U-604. Seaforth Publishing. ISBN 978-1-84832-022-2. Archived from the original on February 21, 2021.
- Price, Alfred (1977). Blitz on Britain 1939–1945. Ian Allan. ISBN 0-7110-0723-3.
- Rider, Todd H. (June 1, 2020). Forgotten Creators – How German-Speaking Scientists And Engineers Invented The Modern World, rev. 2020-06-01 (PDF).
- Siegel, Adam B. (1989). "The Wartime Diversion of U.S. Navy Forces in Response to Public Demands for Augmented Coastal Defense". HyperWar Project. Archived from the original on January 16, 2020.
- Stumpf, David (2006). Regulus, the forgotten weapon : a complete guide to Chance Vought's Regulus I and II. Paducah, KY: Turner Pub. Co. ISBN 978-1-59652-183-4.
- Terraine, John (1985). The Right of the Line. Hodder & Stoughton. ISBN 0-340-26644-9.
- United States Department of the Army (September 28, 1960). USSR: Missiles, Rockets, and Space Effort, a Bibliographic Record, 1956–1960. Vol. DA Pamphlet 70-5-8. Washington, DC. Archived from the original on August 19, 2017.
- United States Department of the Army (1962). Missiles and ventures into space: Progress report, 1961–1962. Washington, DC: U.S. G.P.O.
- U.S. Naval Technical Mission in Europe (October 16, 1945). German Underwater Rockets (Report). Vol. 500–45.
- Werrell, Kenneth P. (1985). The Evolution of the Cruise Missile (PDF). Maxwell Air Force Base, Alabama: Air University Press. Archived (PDF) from the original on August 19, 2020.
- Y'Blood, William T. (2004). Hunter-killer: U.S. escort carriers in the Battle of the Atlantic (illustrated ed.). Annapolis: Naval Institute Press. ISBN 1-59114-995-9.
- Zaloga, Steven (1993). Target america : the soviet union and the strategic arms race, 1945–1964. Diane Pub Co. ISBN 978-0-7881-6725-6.
- Zaloga, Steven (2005). V-1 Flying Bomb 1942–52. Oxford, UK: Osprey Publishing. ISBN 978-1-84176-791-8.
