= Operation Elster =

German WW2 espionage mission

William Colepaugh (L) and Erich Gimpel (R), following their arrest in December 1944.

Operation Elster ("Magpie" in English) was a German espionage mission intended to gather intelligence on U.S. military and technology facilities during World War II. The mission commenced in September 1944 with two Nazi agents sailing from Kiel, Germany on the U-1230 and coming ashore in Maine on November 29, 1944. The agents were William Colepaugh, an American-born defector to Germany, and Erich Gimpel, an experienced German intelligence operative. They spent nearly a month living in New York City, expending large amounts of cash on entertainment, but accomplishing none of their mission goals.

Colepaugh quickly lost his commitment to espionage, and hoping to avoid the death penalty for treason, turned himself in to the FBI and betrayed his partner Gimpel, effectively ending the operation in late December 1944. In February 1945, the two agents were convicted of espionage by a military court and sentenced to death. At the time, the military tribunal which named American citizens in a conspiracy to commit treason was only the third of its kind ever held in the history of the US. When the war ended, their sentence was subsequently commuted to life imprisonment by President Harry S. Truman. Gimpel was paroled in 1955, and Colepaugh in 1960.

Operation Elster was one of only two times the Germans landed agents on North American shores by submarine during the war. Despite a number of claims and speculations that the mission was intended to sabotage the Manhattan Project, no supportive evidence exists in the official investigative records.

== Mission ==
The idea of landing spies in the United States originated with Nazi Germany's foreign minister, Joachim von Ribbentrop, and this particular operation was developed by the Schutzstaffel (SS). Operation Elster would be Germany's second and final attempt to insert agents onto the American mainland by submarine. They had previously landed agents on American shores by U-Boat as part of Operation Pastorius in June 1942, a mission that also failed due to the betrayal of its senior member to the FBI, resulting in the capture of all eight of the espionage agents who were deployed.

Originally intended to gather information gauging the effectiveness of Nazi propaganda in the United States, the objective of Operation Magpie was later widened to include the gathering of technical engineering information, generally from public sources. Of particular interest was intelligence on shipyards, airplane factories, and rocket-testing facilities.

The mission was intended to last for two years, and called for information to be communicated to Germany by morse code radiotelegraphy using a shortwave radio transmitter the agents were expected to build. In the event they could not transmit by radio, they were to send the information via postal letters written in secret ink and addressed to a number of "mail drops", which included both American prisoners of war and intermediaries in Spain. It was thought that the agents would eventually build additional shortwave radio transmitters for use of other German agents sent to the United States in the future.

=== Agents ===
Chosen for the mission were 26 year-old William Colepaugh, an American citizen from Niantic, Connecticut who defected to Germany, and 34 year-old Erich Gimpel, a German radio operator and technician who had been engaged in spying operations in other countries since the start of the war.

Gimpel was a seasoned operative, having begun activities as an intelligence informant in the mid-1930s in Lima, Peru where, while working for Telefunken as a radio engineer, he transmitted shipping information to German U-Boats waiting offshore. He also conveyed information helpful to the German government gathered from corrupt Peruvian officials and underworld contacts. He was deported from Peru back to Germany in 1942, and was shortly recruited by the German Foreign Intelligence Service Amt VI. His experience as a covert operative and skilled radio operator was considered valuable, and he was reportedly assigned to serve in Operation Pelikan, a German espionage mission designed to cripple the Panama Canal which was cancelled shortly before it was scheduled to take place.

According to many accounts, Colepaugh grew up in a family that was very pro-German and often listened to propaganda broadcasts from Berlin. After graduation from Admiral Farragut Academy, he briefly attended MIT. He served 14 months in the United States Merchant Marine. In 1942, he was arrested in Philadelphia for draft evasion. He enlisted in the United States Navy but was discharged "for the good of the service" in 1943. The next year he spent working at a watch factory, and then a farm. In 1944, fearing being drafted by the Army, he signed on as a crew member of the SS Gripsholm and sailed to Lisbon, where he went to the German Embassy and requested to join the German Army, saying that he renounced his US citizenship and owed his allegiance to Germany. In Berlin, he was recruited by the Foreign Intelligence Service, Amt VI, who saw that he was given extensive firearms and espionage training.

Colepaugh was not deemed to be particularly reliable by the Germans, but was judged necessary for the operation due to his easy familiarity with American society and customs. It was also thought that Colepaugh would handle any interactions and conversations with locals for Gimpel, who spoke English with a marked German accent.

=== Landing ===
After completing training in The Hague, Gimpel and Colepaugh boarded U-1230 on September 22, 1944, to sail for the United States. The landing site, located near 44°28′25″N 68°14′41″W on the west coast of Crabtree Neck, Hancock Point, in the town of Hancock, Maine, was chosen because of its remote location, and because it was one of a small number of places on the Maine coast where the submarine would be able to approach relatively close to the shore.

On the evening of November 29, 1944, after spending eight days resting on the ocean floor off the coast of Maine to avoid American patrols, the U-1230 passed into Frenchman Bay and Gimpel and Colepaugh were put ashore at approximately 11 p.m. Eastern Standard Time in an inflatable rubber raft rowed by two German seamen. Before rowing back to the sub, the two seamen allegedly stood on American soil for a moment, ostensibly so they could boast of it later. The landing was delayed in part because the submarine had received reports that another U-boat, engaged in a similar mission, had been sunk nearby and its spies captured. After discussing a number of alternative landing sites along the coast of New England as far south as Newport, Rhode Island, the decision was made to use the originally-chosen landing site.

Gimpel and Colepaugh made their way from the rocky beach to a local road, hiked 5 miles (8.0 km) to United States Route 1, and were fortunately able to flag a cab that was making its way to Bangor. The men were spotted twice while on foot in the Hancock Point area, with both observers noting with suspicion their city garb, suitcases, and lack of hats on the snowy night. Mary Forni, a local housewife, saw the pair walking together as she drove home from a card game. 17 year-old Harvard Hodgkins, a Boy Scout and son of local deputy sheriff Dana Hodgkins, also spotted the two men as he was driving home from a dance. The boy noticed that their footprints on the snowy ground originated from a path that led to the beach. The elder Hodgkins was away on a hunting trip, but by the time he returned, investigated the reports, and contacted the FBI, fully five days had elapsed.

=== Activities ===
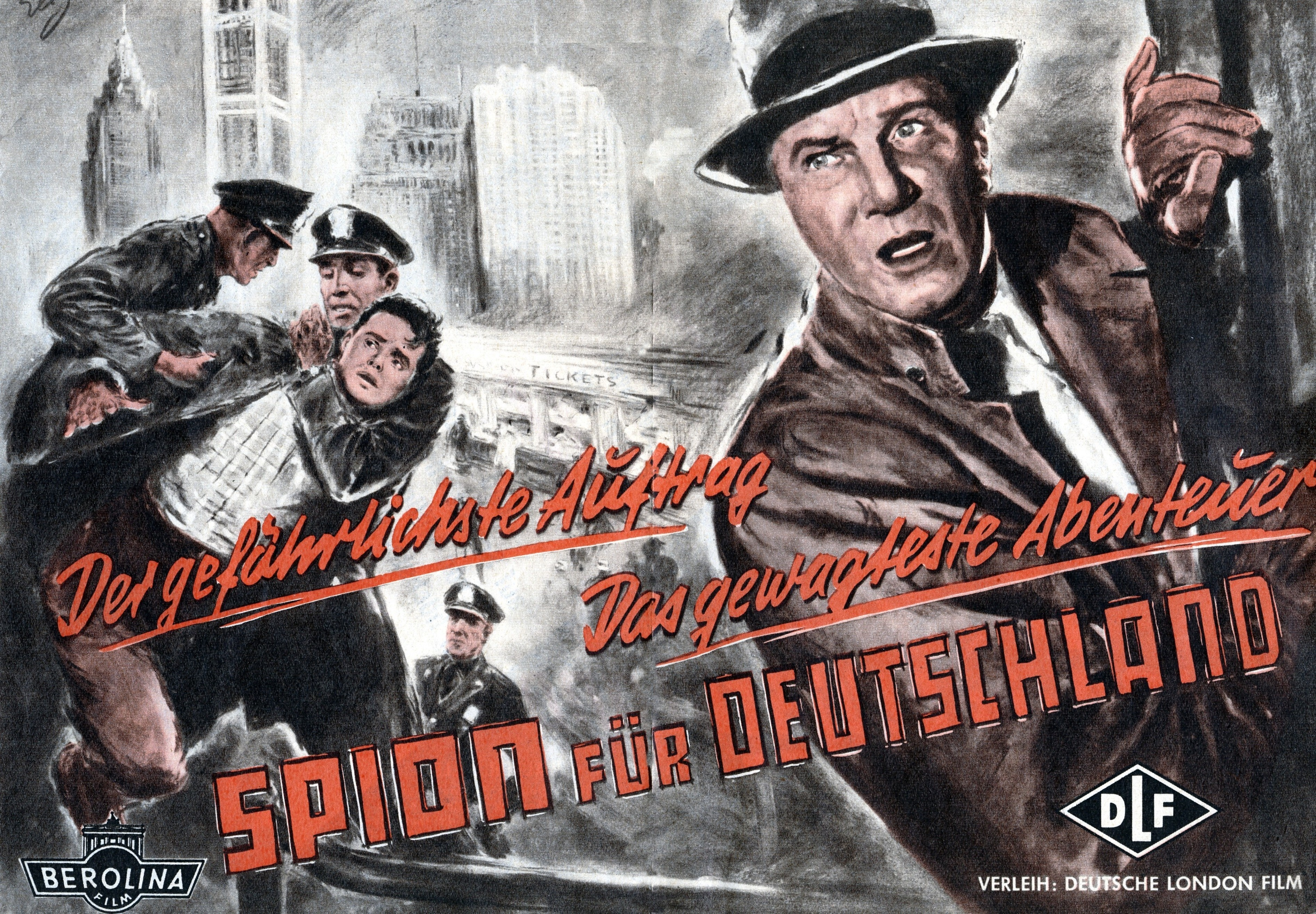
Operation Magpie was dramatized in the 1956 film Spy for Germany (German title: Spion für Deutschland)

From Bangor, the pair made their way to Boston and then New York City by train. In addition to false identity papers, they were equipped with US$60,000 (equivalent to about $1,097,000 in 2025), a "backup" cache of 99 diamonds, two .32 caliber Colt automatic pistols, a Leica camera with a special lens for document copying, two Krahl wristwatches, secret inks and developers, and microdots that contained radio schematics and transmission schedules as well as mail drop addresses.

Using the aliases Edward Green (Gimpel) and William Caldwell (Colepaugh), they rented a studio apartment on the top floor of a building at 39 Beekman Place, selected for its lack of steel frame construction that might interfere with radio signals. They set about procuring parts for the radio transmitter Gimpel was expected to build. A bulky magnifier unit was supplied to them by Berlin to read the microdots containing radio plans, however they left it behind when disembarking the submarine because of its excessive weight. They bought a magnifying glass, but found it was insufficiently powerful to read the dots. Gimpel obtained a 1944 edition ARRL Radio Amateurs Handbook containing transmitter plans, as well as a multimeter, several milliamp meters, a roll of copper bell wire, and some small hand tools. They purchased a used General Electric broadcast radio receiver which Gimpel intended to convert to an 80 watt shortwave radio transmitter by modifying it with additional electronic components, however there is no evidence this was ever accomplished.

Once landed in America, Colepaugh was more interested in spending money and chasing women than in conducting espionage work. Although Gimpel tried to persuade him to record shipping activity in New York harbor and assist in shopping for radio parts, Colepaugh preferred to take advantage of the many attractions the city had to offer. Gimpel was substantially more focused on the mission than his partner. However, he was not immune to the enticements of New York City; he and Colepaugh often ate together in restaurants such as Longchamps and the Hickory House, visited nightclubs such as the Latin Quarter and Leon and Eddie's, and patronized numerous bars in Greenwich Village. They also attended theaters such as the Roxy, Radio City Music Hall, and the Capitol. According to some estimates, the pair spent between $1,500–2,700 (equivalent to about $27,400–49,400 in 2025) of their funds in a single month, mostly on bars, restaurants, nightclubs, shows, and clothing.

Colepaugh enthusiastically pursued numerous casual sexual affairs with women, tipped extravagantly, and drank heavily. He was sometimes absent for many hours at a time, using hotels such as the Empire and Essex for his sexual liaisons. Gimpel passed the time reading newspapers, going to the movies to watch newsreels, and dining out at some of New York City's finer steak houses. On December 21, Colepaugh permanently deserted Gimpel, making off with $48,000 (equivalent to about $878,000 in 2025) of their currency, and taking a room at the Hotel St. Moritz to continue his spree of nightclubbing and womanizing.

=== Arrest ===
A few days later, a troubled Colepaugh sought out an old schoolmate, Edmund Mulcahy. He confessed that he was part of a Nazi espionage mission, and sought his friend's advice on how to surrender to authorities. Colepaugh hoped he'd be granted immunity from prosecution if he turned himself in, revealed information about the Nazi war effort, and voluntarily betrayed Gimpel. After discussing Colepaugh's options with him over the Christmas holiday, Mulcahy agreed to make initial contact with the FBI on behalf of Colepaugh. On December 26, Federal agents arrived at the Mulcahy family home in Richmond Hill, NY, and took Colepaugh into custody after a brief questioning.

The bureau had already been searching for the two German agents following the sinking of a Canadian ship a few miles from the Maine coastline (indicating a U-boat had been nearby) and reports of suspicious sightings by local residents Forni and Hodgkins. The FBI interrogated Colepaugh at the United States Courthouse at Foley Square in New York City, and gained information which then enabled them to track down Gimpel. It was learned that Gimpel, who could read and speak Spanish, habitually visited a Times Square newsstand located at the corner of 42nd Street and 7th Avenue where he bought Peruvian newspapers. Gimpel was subsequently arrested at that location on December 30.

=== Interrogation ===
The pair remained in custody at the Courthouse in Foley Square and underwent interrogation for approximately three weeks. A U.S. Navy Department report on their interrogation notes that it yielded intelligence on German submarine operations and naval bases. According to the report, Colepaugh was "a somewhat unstable New Englander but impressed his interrogators as attempting to tell the truth. [H]e is intelligent, very observant, and has an extraordinary visual memory for details. His attitude toward the interrogators was friendly and cooperative. He was always careful to distinguish between eye witness evidence and hearsay. The interrogators were under the impression that his helpfulness was inspired by the hope of escaping the death penalty".

Gimpel was characterized in the same report as "a very difficult subject for interrogation. He was a professional German espionage agent, thoroughly indoctrinated in security. He believed that the death penalty awaits him and that nothing he can do will mitigate his sentence. He was untruthful on several occasions with his interrogators and told them only what he believed they already knew. His statements are of very little value".

The FBI undertook its own investigation into Gimpel and Colepaugh's backgrounds and activities, and in a report to President Franklin Roosevelt, J. Edgar Hoover noted that Colepaugh's mother claimed to be a cousin of the President and First Lady Eleanor Roosevelt and could produce genealogical evidence. Roosevelt dismissed this, however, telling Hoover, "He is no relation of mine".

=== Trial ===
Gimpel and Colepaugh were transferred to Governors Island on January 18, 1945, to stand trial by a military commission. Future Supreme Court Justice Tom C. Clark was selected to prosecute the case. At the time, the military tribunal which named American citizens in a conspiracy to commit treason was only the third of its type convened in the history of the US; the first was in 1865 after the assassination of Abraham Lincoln, and the second in 1942 following the capture of German agents involved in Operation Pastorius.

Legal counsels assigned to Gimpel were Major Charles E. Reagin and Major John E. Haigney. Colepaugh was represented by Major Thayer Chapman and Major Robert B. Buckley. During the trial, Colepaugh's defense claimed that the accused had a change of heart while in Germany, undertook the espionage mission as a way to get back to the US and turn himself in, but could not easily get away from a watchful Gimpel. The prosecution countered, saying that Colepaugh was often alone without Gimpel and had many opportunities to turn himself in during the month since he arrived in Maine by submarine, but failed to act on any of them.

In February 1945, the pair were convicted of espionage by the military tribunal and sentenced to death. This was subsequently commuted to life imprisonment by President Harry S. Truman. Gimpel was paroled in 1955; Colepaugh was paroled in 1960.

== Atomic espionage claims ==
Claims that Gimpel had a secret mission not disclosed to Colepaugh to sabotage heavy water works related to the Manhattan Project are without foundation in the documentary record. Although some proponents have claimed Gimpel's target was a heavy water research facility at the Massachusetts Institute of Technology, no such program existed beyond relatively small-scale research, and official files concerning the activities of Colepaugh and Gimpel contain nothing to substantiate the claim.

Author David Kahn wrote that “Gimpel’s ghostwritten account of the mission, Spy for Germany, must be used with the greatest caution, as it differs in a number of critical points from his (FBI) statement. The most important are the book’s claims that he was assigned to ferret out atomic secrets, that he succeeded to some extent, and that he radioed a message to Germany. None of these are supported by his statement or by Colepaugh’s or by postwar interrogations of his spymasters, and the atomic claim is specifically contradicted by a statement of Walter Schellenberg", Nazi Germany's final head of military intelligence.

== V-weapon claims ==
During his interrogation, Colepaugh claimed that German U-boats were being equipped with long range rocket launchers. Supposedly, the U-1230 was shadowed by a U-boat pack equipped with such V-weapons intended to be launched at New York City and Washington D.C. Although the US took the threat seriously, it never materialized, and Colepaugh's claim was later proven false.

== Books and film ==
Gimpel co-authored an autobiographical book about his experiences entitled Agent 146 in the mid-1950s, later published as Spy for Germany in Great Britain, and adapted for a West German film of the same name in 1956. During research for his own book about Operation Elster, author Robert Miller noted a number of inconsistencies in Gimpel's highly romanticized accounts of his espionage activities in the US, commenting that, "it is filled with sensational contradictions and fantasies, almost from cover to cover, when compared to the official FBI reports and trial records". Author David Kahn also compared Gimpel's book to official records and found it to contain many inaccuracies and unsupported fabrications.

== Legacy ==
The landing site was listed on the National Register of Historic Places in 2003.

== See also ==
- Operation Pastorius
- National Register of Historic Places listings in Hancock County, Maine
