= Tom C. Clark =

US Supreme Court justice from 1949 to 1967

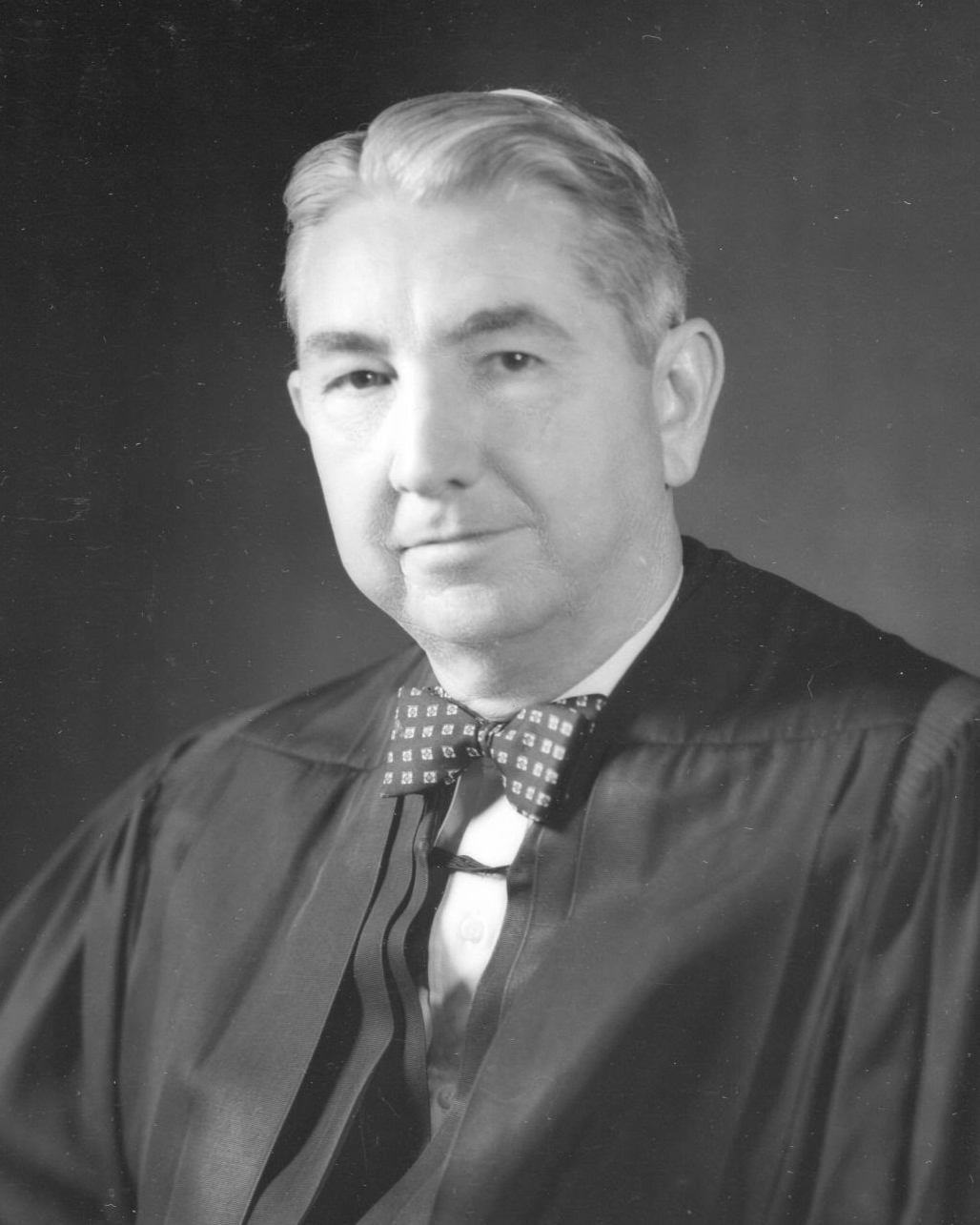
- Official portrait, 1956

Associate Justice of the Supreme Court of the United States
- In office August 24, 1949 – June 12, 1967
- Nominated by: Harry S. Truman
- Preceded by: Frank Murphy
- Succeeded by: Thurgood Marshall

59th United States Attorney General
- In office June 27, 1945 – July 26, 1949
- President: Harry S. Truman
- Preceded by: Francis Biddle
- Succeeded by: Howard McGrath

United States Assistant Attorney General for the Criminal Division
- In office October 3, 1943 – June 21, 1945
- President: Franklin D. Roosevelt; Harry S. Truman
- Preceded by: Wendell Berge
- Succeeded by: Theron Caudle

Personal details
- Born: Thomas Campbell Clark; September 23, 1899 Dallas, Texas, U.S.
- Died: June 13, 1977 (aged 77) New York City, U.S.
- Resting place: Restland Memorial Park
- Party: Democratic
- Spouse: Mary Ramsey (m. 1924)
- Children: 3, including Ramsey
- Education: University of Texas at Austin (BA, LLB)

Military service
- Allegiance: United States
- Branch/service: United States National Guard
- Years of service: 1917–1918
- Rank: Sergeant
- Unit: Texas Army National Guard
- Battles/wars: World War I

Thomas Campbell Clark (September 23, 1899 – June 13, 1977) was an American lawyer who served as the 59th United States attorney general from 1945 to 1949 and as Associate Justice of the Supreme Court of the United States from 1949 to 1967.

Clark was born in Dallas, Texas, and graduated from the University of Texas School of Law after serving in World War I. He practiced law in Dallas until 1937, when he accepted a position in the U.S. Department of Justice. After Harry S. Truman became President of the United States in 1945, he chose Clark as his Attorney General. In 1949, Truman successfully nominated Clark to fill the U.S. Supreme Court vacancy caused by the death of Associate Justice Frank Murphy, making Clark the first and, as of 2026, only Supreme Court Justice from the state of Texas. Clark remained on the Court until retiring to allow his son, Ramsey Clark, to assume the position of U.S. Attorney General. Clark was succeeded by the first African American Supreme Court Justice, Thurgood Marshall, in October 1967.

Clark served on the Vinson Court and the Warren Court. He voted with the Court's majority in several cases concerning racial segregation, including the landmark case of Brown v. Board of Education. He wrote the majority opinion in landmark Mapp v. Ohio, which ruled that the Fourth Amendment prohibition against unreasonable searches and seizures applies to the states through the Fourteenth Amendment. He also wrote the majority opinion in Heart of Atlanta Motel v. United States, which upheld the public accommodations provision of the Civil Rights Act of 1964, and the majority opinions in Garner v. Board of Public Works, Joseph Burstyn, Inc. v. Wilson, Abington School District v. Schempp (which found that mandatory Bible reading in public schools was unconstitutional), and the "aggressively anti-homosexual" Boutilier v. Immigration and Naturalization Service.

== Early life ==
Clark was born in Dallas, Texas, on September 23, 1899, the son of Virginia Maxey (née Falls) and William Henry Clark. His parents had moved from Mississippi to Texas; his lawyer father became the youngest man ever elected president of the Texas Bar Association to that time. Young Tom attended the local public schools, including Dallas High School, where he received honors for debate and oratory. Thomas was one of the first 200 Eagle Scouts (number 188) as listed in Boys Life Magazine in October 1914, Eagle Scout. He then attended the Virginia Military Institute for a year but returned home for financial reasons. In 1918, Clark volunteered to serve in World War I with the U.S. Army, but he did not weigh enough. However, the Texas National Guard accepted him, and he served as an infantryman and advanced to Sergeant.

After the war ended, Clark enrolled at the University of Texas at Austin and received a Bachelor of Arts degree in 1921. He remained there and attended the University of Texas School of Law, receiving a Bachelor of Laws degree in 1922. He was a brother of Delta Tau Delta fraternity and later served as their international president from 1966 to 1968.

== Early career ==
Upon admission to the Texas bar, Clark set up a law practice in his home town from 1922 to 1937. He left private practice to serve as the civil district attorney of Dallas from 1927 to 1932. He then resumed his private practice for four years.

Clark, a Democrat, joined the Justice Department in 1937 as a special assistant to the U.S. attorney general, working in the war risk litigation section. He later moved to the antitrust division, then run by legendary trust-buster Thurman Arnold, and in 1940 was sent to head up the department's West Coast antitrust office. When the Japanese attacked Pearl Harbor the following year, Clark was named by Attorney General Francis Biddle as the Civilian Coordinator of the Alien Enemy Control Program. In this capacity, he worked with General John DeWitt, the head of West Coast military forces, and his future Supreme Court colleague Earl Warren, who was then attorney general of California, and other top federal and state officials in the lead up to the internment of Japanese Americans. The initial actions involved enforcement of policies to exclude Japanese Americans from areas designated by the military as prohibited, followed by evacuation from "critical zones and areas," and finally by forcible relocation to inland camps.

Clark had been reassigned to Washington in May 1942 and was not directly involved with the internment of Japanese Americans in concentration camps, although he later acknowledged that the government's relocation program was a mistake. In 1943, Clark was promoted to Assistant Attorney General for Antitrust, and subsequently became the head of the Justice Department's Criminal Division. Clark was also appointed to lead a new War Frauds unit created to investigate and prosecute corruption by government contractors. During this period, he worked closely with, and befriended Harry Truman, whose Truman Committee was investigating war frauds.

Clark assisted the successful prosecution of two German spies who came ashore from a German submarine in 1944 to the East Coast of the United States as part of Operation Elster ("Magpie"). One, William Colepaugh, was an American citizen, while the other, Erich Gimpel, was a native German. The prosecution took place before a military tribunal on Governor's Island in New York, only the third such military trial in the nation's history.

== U.S. Attorney General ==
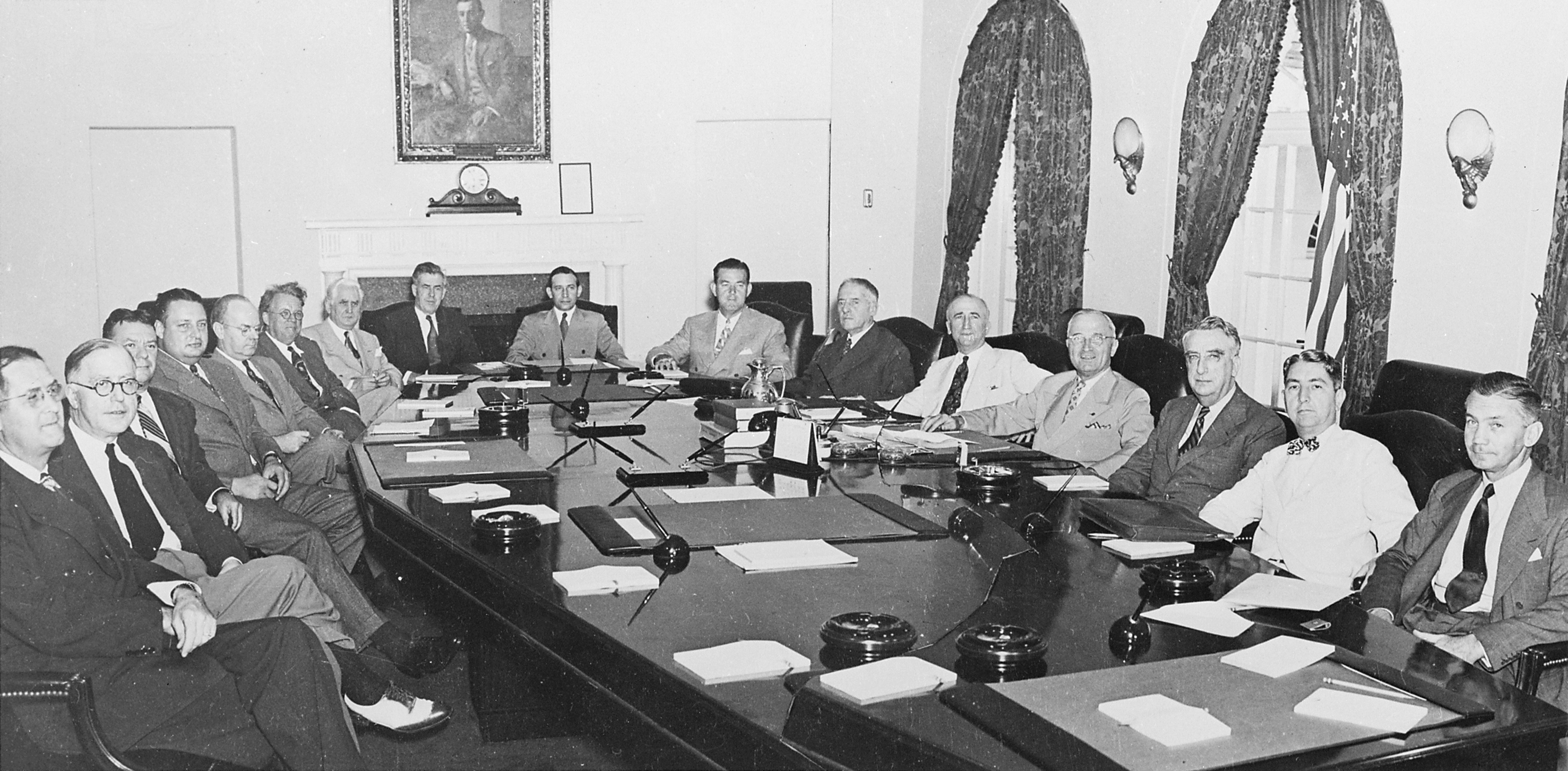
Attorney General Tom C. Clark (second from right), with President Harry S. Truman cabinet in 1945

One of President Truman's first changes in the cabinet that he inherited from Franklin Roosevelt was his appointment of Tom Clark as attorney general in 1945, a switch made in part because of the close personal and professional relationship shared by the two men. Media coverage of Clark's nomination was generally favorable and reflected the strength of Clark's legal and political skills. As a short article in Life Magazine stated, "He is a good prosecutor and good lawyer, but most of all he is a thorough politician.".

As attorney general, Clark initially continued to focus a good deal of the department's energy on prosecuting war fraud crimes, as well as aggressively taking on potential antitrust violations. Clark and the White House also challenged John Lewis, the head of the United Mine Workers union, who was threatening a national strike. Acting on Truman's orders to enforce a law prohibiting strikes against government-run facilities, Clark's legal battle with Lewis culminated in a Supreme Court case, which he argued successfully, and the Court upheld contempt citations against the union leader.

Early in his tenure as attorney general, Clark initiated a campaign against juvenile delinquency that emphasized the importance of rehabilitation and education. He implemented procedural changes in federal courts and supported parole for first-time juvenile offenders. He convened a national conference at the White House on the topic and created a National Commission on Juvenile Delinquency, selecting a young and inexperienced, but well connected Eunice Kennedy to head it.

Clark played an important role in support of Truman's pioneering efforts in civil rights, helping to bring the power of the federal government behind civil rights enforcement. In response to Truman's anger and disgust over the Ku Klux Klan's violent post-war attacks on returning black servicemen, Clark began to strengthen the federal government's response, using increased investigations and, in some cases, an unprecedented filing of federal charges. Clark also initiated an aggressive and groundbreaking legal strategy of filing amicus (friend of the court) legal briefs in federal civil rights cases, which signaled a new and more engaged role for the federal government. The most important of the briefs he filed was in Shelley v. Kraemer (1948), helping to convince the Court to strike down racial covenants in housing contracts restricting the sale of property to blacks. Clark also helped guide the creation of a presidentially established committee on civil rights. The committee released an influential report, "To Secure These Rights," which provided 35 recommendations, including ending segregation, eliminating poll taxes, enacting a law to protect voting rights, and creating a civil rights division at the Department of Justice. The report had a significant and lasting influence on civil rights providing, as Tom Clark later said, "a blueprint of most everything that's been done in the area of civil rights since that time."

During his years as attorney general, which coincided with the early years of the Cold War, Clark was responsible for developing and implementing a number of the Truman administration's aggressive anti-communist policies, including a central feature of Executive Order 9835 concerning the loyalty of federal employees, the Attorney General's List of Subversive Organizations. This and other policies Clark promoted were often criticized by civil libertarians. However, at least some of Clark's efforts were initiated to deflect congressional criticism of the Truman administration, particularly by the House Committee on Un-American Activities (HUAC). Important early anti-Communist cases during his tenure include the Smith Act, Coplon, and Hiss-Chambers cases.

Clark's anti-communist efforts also emphasized the promotion of the values of democracy and American citizenship. He created the Freedom Train, a specially built and privately financed train with railcars designed as a museum and housing more than 100 original documents in US history, including the Bill of Rights, the Emancipation Proclamation, and the Mayflower Compact. The train visited more than 300 cities across the country on its patriotic and educational mission, and during its year of travel was viewed by millions.

== Supreme Court Justice ==
After playing an active role in reelecting Truman in 1948, Clark made clear to the White House that he was planning to return to Texas and the practice of law. Following the sudden death of Supreme court associate justice Frank Murphy, however, Truman nominated Clark to fill the vacancy, partly to bolster the majority of Chief Justice Fred Vinson, a former cabinet colleague and friend of Clark who, since his appointment three years earlier, had failed to unify the Court. Numerous attacks from across the political spectrum were leveled at the nomination, including charges of "cronyism," a lack of judicial experience, and objections based in part on his work at the center of Truman's anti-communist agenda and, specifically, the Attorney General's List of Subversive Organizations. Former Roosevelt cabinet members Henry Wallace and Harold Ickes also leveled broadsides for personal and ideological reasons.

Ickes said about the nomination, "President Truman has not 'elevated' Tom C. Clark to the Supreme Court, he has degraded the Court." The New York Times called Clark "a personal and political friend [of Truman's] with no judicial experience and few demonstrated qualifications."

The Clark confirmation hearing before the Senate Judiciary Committee took place in August 1949. Clark declined to testify in person, stating that he "didn't think that a person who had been nominated to the Supreme Court should testify, [since] it jeopardized his future effectiveness on the Court, [and] that he would invariably testify to something that would plague him." Nonetheless, on August 12, the committee voted 9–2 to send the nomination to the full Senate with a favorable recommendation. Clark was confirmed by the Senate on August 18, 1949, by a vote of 73–8, and took the judicial oath of office on August 24, 1949.

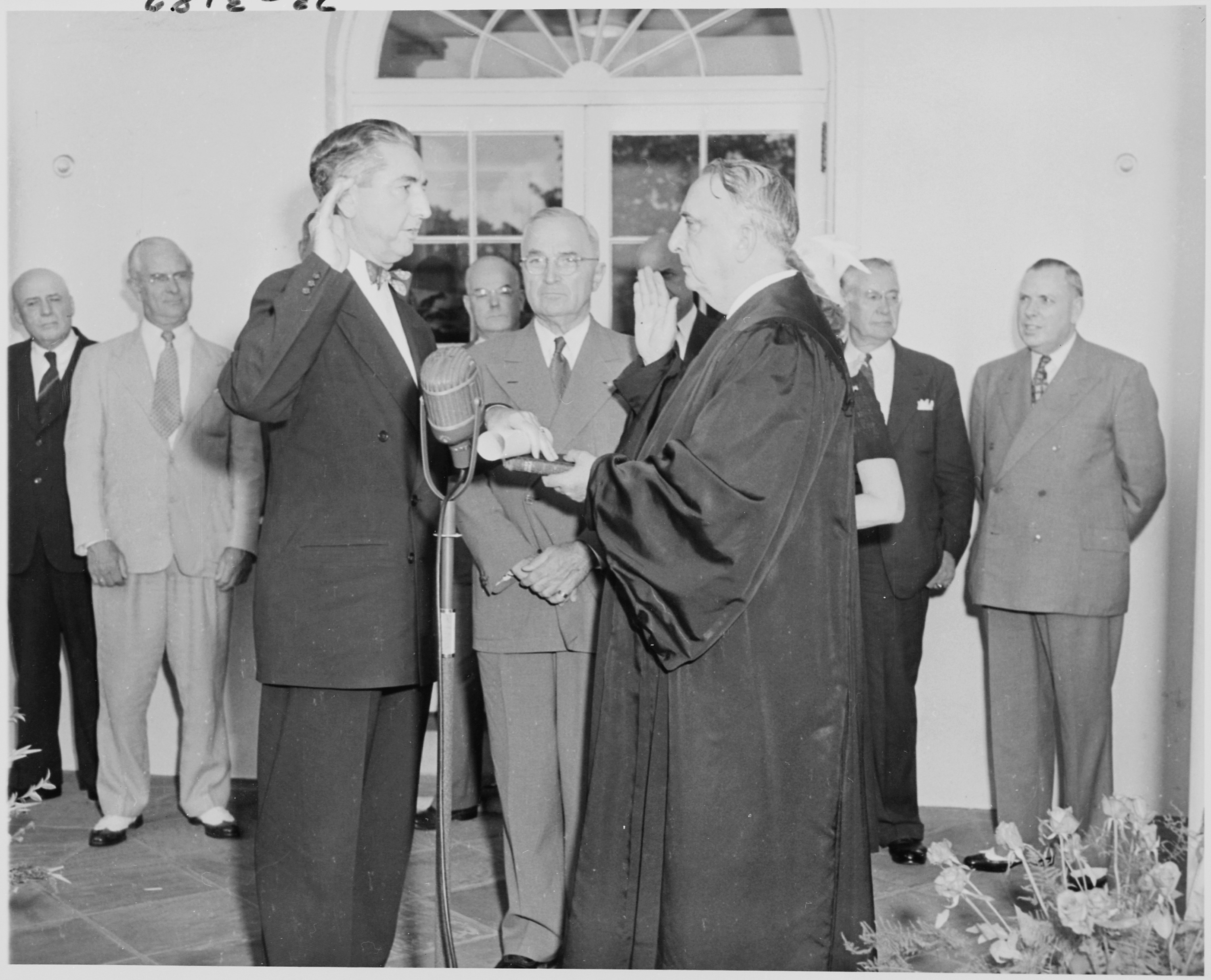
Tom C. Clark being sworn in as an associate justice of the United States Supreme Court by Chief Justice Fred M. Vinson, August 24, 1949

In the four years they served together on the Court, Clark voted with Vinson more than 85 percent of the time and helped provide him with a reliable majority. However, the Court as a whole remained fragmented. In 1953, Vinson died of a heart attack. For the remainder of his tenure on the Court, Clark served alongside Chief Justice Earl Warren, producing a mix of opinions that makes it difficult to characterize him as either conservative or liberal.

Clark backed decisions supporting government enforcement of laws designed to promote racial equality. To this end, he authored or played a critical supporting role in many of the Court's landmark decisions in this area. Several rulings by the Vinson Court, most notably Sweatt v. Painter and McLaurin v. Oklahoma State Regents (1950), which held that black graduate students must be allowed into "white" state universities and law schools because the separate black school could not provide an education of equal quality, helped lay the groundwork for holdings including Brown v. Board of Education (1954). Clark played a critical behind-the-scenes role in Sweatt and McLaurin that shaped the discussion and provided a workable solution on this issue, helping to "move the Court from considering equality only as a measurable mathematical construct … to what would become known as intangibles." Clark's role as one of two southern justices gave him additional impact in those cases, such as Hernandez v. Texas (1954), in which the Court ruled that excluding persons of Mexican ancestry from juries violated the Constitution. He also authored several important decisions on race in the 1960s during the height of the Civil Rights era, including Anderson v. Martin (1964), which held unconstitutional a Louisiana statute because it required the races of those running for office to be printed on a ballot, Burton v. Wilmington Parking Authority, which upheld the concept of state action to find that a private restaurant violated the 14th Amendment's Equal Protection Clause, and Heart of Atlanta Motel v. United States and Katzenbach v. McClung, which upheld the public accommodations provision of the 1964 Civil Rights Act.

Clark also faced many cases addressing the constitutionality of Cold War-era laws that required individuals to affirm that they were not members of particular groups or parties. In this area, Clark generally took a traditionally conservative position to support such requirements, consistent with his work as attorney general. During his first years on the Court, Clark recused himself from many of these cases because they had grown out of challenges to policies and laws Clark had helped initiate or implement. In those cases in which he did participate he generally was deferential to the government, and helped provide the Court with a majority affirming the constitutionality of many such laws. Garner v. Board of Public Works (1951) was a 5–4 decision he authored that upheld the right of a city to require its employees to file affidavits that they were not, nor had ever been, members of the Communist Party and to take loyalty oaths to that effect. "Past conduct may well relate to present fitness. Past loyalty may have a reasonable relationship to present and future trust," he wrote. But Clark also demonstrated a willingness to strike down such laws when they were excessive or overly broad in their application, specifically when they involved the question of whether an individual knew of the organization with which they were allegedly affiliated. Thus, in Wieman v. Updegraff (1952), Clark struck down a loyalty statute from Oklahoma that required all state employees to take an oath that they were not and had never been for the past five years members of any organization that had been on the attorney general's list of subversive organizations. "Membership may be innocent," Clark wrote.

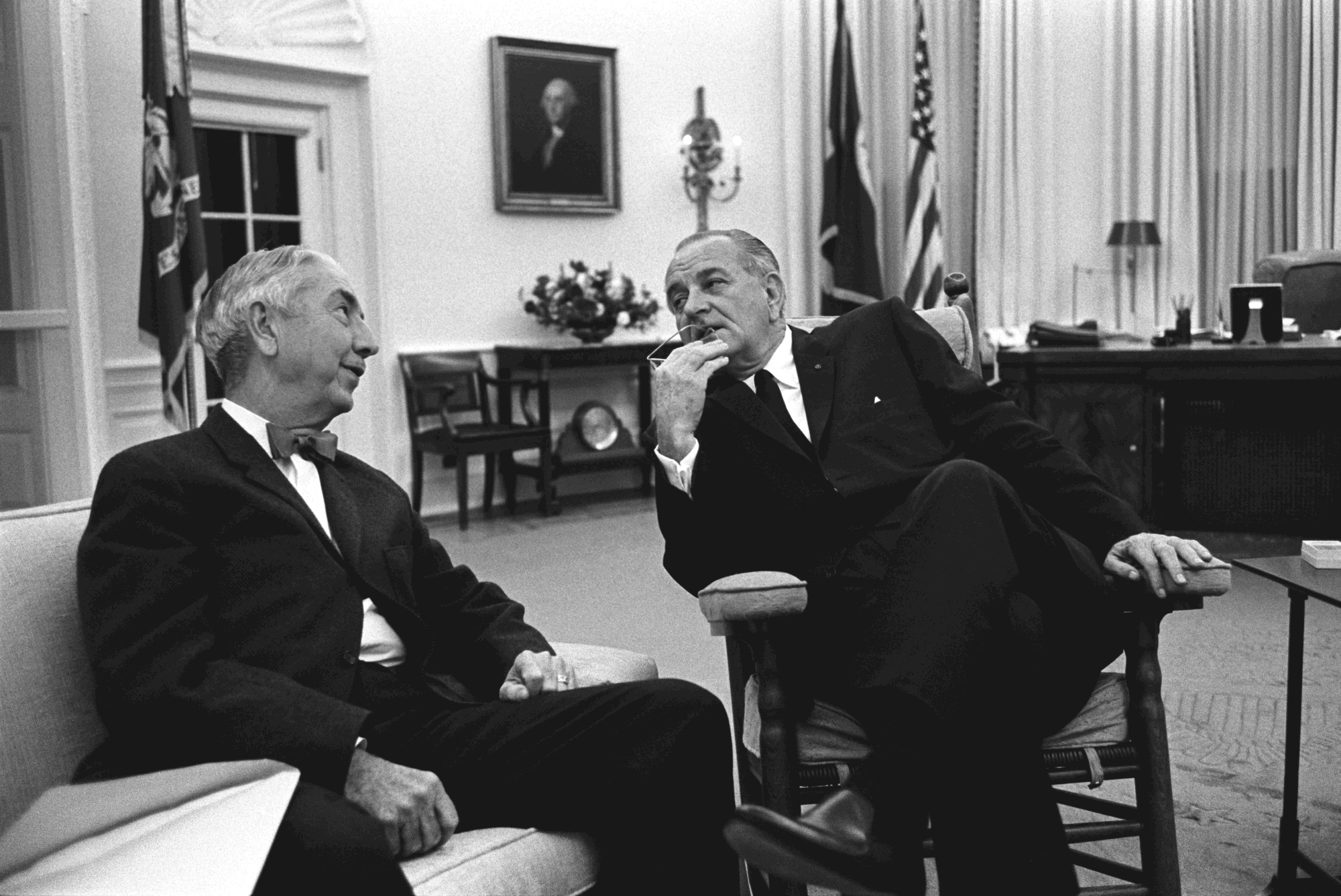
Clark with President Lyndon B. Johnson in the Oval Office at the White House.

Over the next decade, the shifting Court makeup and the evolution of public sentiment led the Court to find a number of these Cold War statutes unconstitutional. In many instances, Clark was the lone dissenter. Among the most memorable was his solo dissent in Jencks v. United States, in which he labeled the Court's action a "big mistake," and suggested that allowing an individual charged with falsely swearing that he was not a member of the Communist Party to see reports made by two FBI witnesses against him, "afforded him a Roman holiday for rummaging through confidential information as well as vital national secrets." Clark's dissent sparked congressional legislation overriding the Court's decision and placing limits on the kinds of documents criminal defendants can request. Even as he would demonstrate more progressive views in other areas of the law, Clark continued to exhibit his belief in the government's power to prevent people with certain associations from holding certain jobs. Thus, as late as 1967, he dissented in Keyishian v. Board of Regents, in which the Court struck down as unconstitutionally vague a law preventing a state university from hiring "subversives."

Clark's background as a former prosecutor and attorney general also influenced his views in the area of criminal procedure and cases involving the rights of criminal defendants, often leading him to support the government's prosecutorial efforts, particularly during his early years on the bench. In Crooker v. California (1958), for instance, he wrote the Court's 5–4 opinion upholding a murder conviction of a man who was repeatedly refused legal counsel and had not been informed of his right to remain silent during fourteen hours between his arrest and confession because, in Clark's view, the police tactics were reasonable and the confession voluntary. Six years later, however, he joined with his more liberal brethren in the landmark decision Gideon v. Wainwright (1963) upholding the right to a fair trial and due process under the Sixth Amendment and holding that an individual defendant must have an attorney appointed for him if he cannot afford one. Clark dissented in Miranda v. Arizona, the historic ruling in which the Court held that the Constitution ensures a "right to remain silent." Still, he later clarified that he agreed with the underlying idea of limits on custodial interrogation. Clark also authored the Court's landmark decision in Mapp v. Ohio, which broadened the Fourth Amendment's prohibition on the prosecution's use of improperly seized evidence, known as the exclusionary rule, to include state prosecutions. Clark's law enforcement background led him to support this approach because he believed that having a district attorney and a federal prosecutor operating under the same system would ensure that police would be more disciplined and that it would lower the risk of evidence being disallowed. Clark demonstrated this progressive understanding right up through his final day on the bench, writing Berger v. New York (1967), an important Fourth Amendment decision in which the Court held unconstitutional a state statute allowing electronic eavesdropping. It was a holding that was quite distant from policies he had imposed as attorney general.

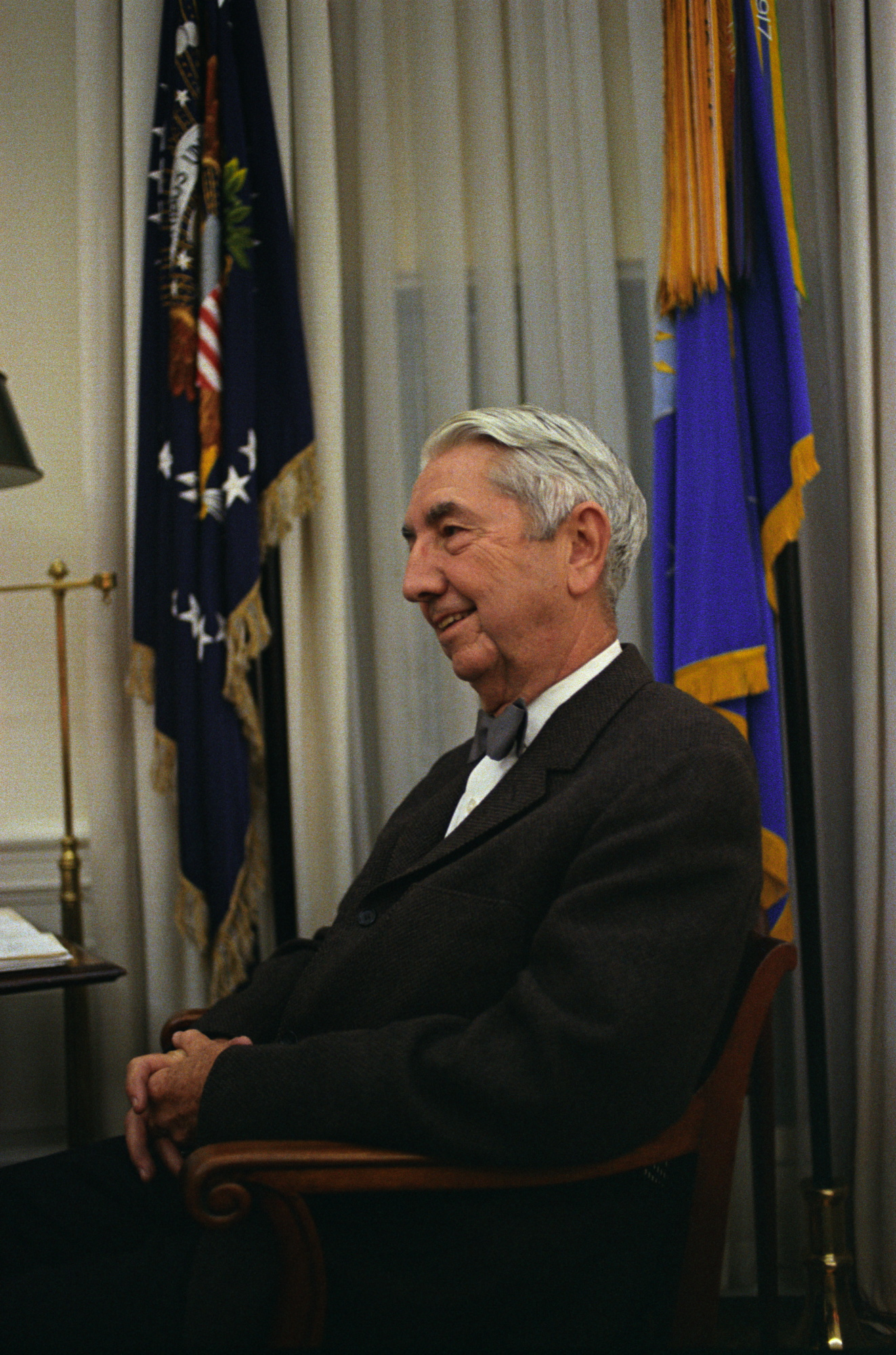
Clark in the Oval Office in 1967 after retiring from the Supreme Court.

Clark also wrote the decision for the Warren Court in a major religion case involving the First Amendment's Establishment Clause and reinforcing the principle of separation of church and state. Clark's opinion in Abington School District v. Schempp (1963), holding that Bible reading exercises and mandated prayer in public schools violated the Constitution, offered the most basic and textual type of constitutional interpretation, "The Constitution says that the government shall take no part in the establishment of religion … No means no," he wrote.

Clark's work as a Supreme Court justice generally is viewed favorably by legal historians. As one scholar noted, he was "dedicated to the work of judging, not ideology.". A leading Supreme Court scholar called Clark "the most underrated Justice in recent Supreme Court history." During his career, Clark balanced an underlying judicial restraint with a more expansive, yet principled reading of the Constitution and he demonstrated a rare capacity for change and growth. Justice William O. Douglas, with whom Clark served for all of his time on the Court, commented that Clark had "the indispensable capacity to develop so that with the passage of time he grew in stature and expanded his dimensions." Ultimately, Clark came to more fully understand, as he wrote in 1970, that the Constitution "is a living instrument which also must be construed in a manner to meet the practical necessities of the present."

In Merle Miller's book Plain Speaking, based on interviews with President Truman, Miller attributes to Truman the statement that appointing Clark to the Court was his "biggest mistake" as president, adding, "He was no damn good as Attorney General, and on the Supreme Court . . . it doesn't seem possible, but he's been even worse." Allegedly asked by Miller to explain the comment, Miller quotes Truman as stating further: "The main thing is . . . well, it isn't so much that he's a bad man. It's just that he's such a dumb son of a bitch. He's about the dumbest man I think I've ever run across." Truman historians have challenged the accuracy and even the existence of a number of the quotes in the book, including the one about Clark. As one historian who listened to the original interview tapes noted, Miller "changed Truman's words in countless ways, sometimes thoughtfully adding his own opinions… Worst of all, Miller made up many dates in his book, inventing whole chapters." The purported comments also run counter to Truman and Clark's warm, personal relationship. No tape of the interview in which Truman and Miller discussed Clark is known to exist.

== Later life ==
Clark assumed senior status, effectively retiring from the Supreme Court, on June 12, 1967. He did so to avoid a conflict of interest when his son, Ramsey Clark, was appointed Attorney General. He was the last serving Supreme Court Justice to have been appointed by President Truman. He was succeeded on the Court by Thurgood Marshall. Lyndon Johnson was said to have appointed Ramsey Clark as Attorney General precisely to force his father off the bench, leaving a vacancy so that Johnson could appoint Marshall as the first African-American Justice on the Supreme Court.

After he retired, Clark toured the world as a goodwill ambassador. He then headed a commission of the American Bar Association (ABA) studying the lawyer disciplinary system. This Special Committee on Evaluation of Disciplinary Enforcement, which the ABA had agreed to form at its February 1967 midyear meeting, came to be called the Clark Commission. Its 200-page study, published in 1970, criticized the existing lawyer disciplinary system, which it found grossly understaffed and underfunded, and nonexistent in many states. It also criticized methods for selecting judges. After the Watergate scandal, many of the commission's reforms were adopted, including the Multistate Professional Responsibility Examination and establishment of bar disciplinary authorities in each state. Clark sought to coordinate his committee's work with that of the "Wright Committee," which was revising the Rules of Professional Responsibility.

The ABA unanimously approved the Clark Committee's report and created a Standing Committee on Professional Discipline in 1973. Furthermore, in 1977, the ABA created another commission to study lawyer discipline. That commission, nicknamed the "Kutak Commission" after Omaha, Nebraska attorney Robert J. Kutak, drafted the Model Rules of Professional Conduct, which in 1983 after extended discussion and watering-down of the client perjury/organizational misconduct section, the ABA House of Delegates recommended succeed the Model Code of Professional Responsibility which the ABA (partly on the recommendation of Justice Lewis Powell) had proposed states adopt in 1969. The Kutak Commission found the Model Code had serious inadequacies. Many states failed to adopt or enforce the model provisions relating to attorneys disclosing client misconduct, which after the Enron scandal, led Congress to pass the Sarbanes-Oxley Act in 2002.

Clark also served as the first director of the Federal Judicial Center, and a visiting judge on several U.S. Courts of Appeals. He also served as chair of the board of directors for the American Judicature Society, co-founded The National Judicial College, and chaired the Joint Committee on the More Effective Administration of Justice.

== Death ==
Clark died in his sleep in New York City on June 13, 1977, in his son's apartment. He was interred in Restland Memorial Park, Dallas County, Texas.

== Works ==
- Prejudice and property, an historic brief against racial covenants with Philip B. Perlman (Washington: Public Affairs Press, 1948)
- Courts for a new nation by Dwight F. Henderson, foreword by Tom C. Clark (Washington: Public Affairs Press, 1971)

== Legacy ==
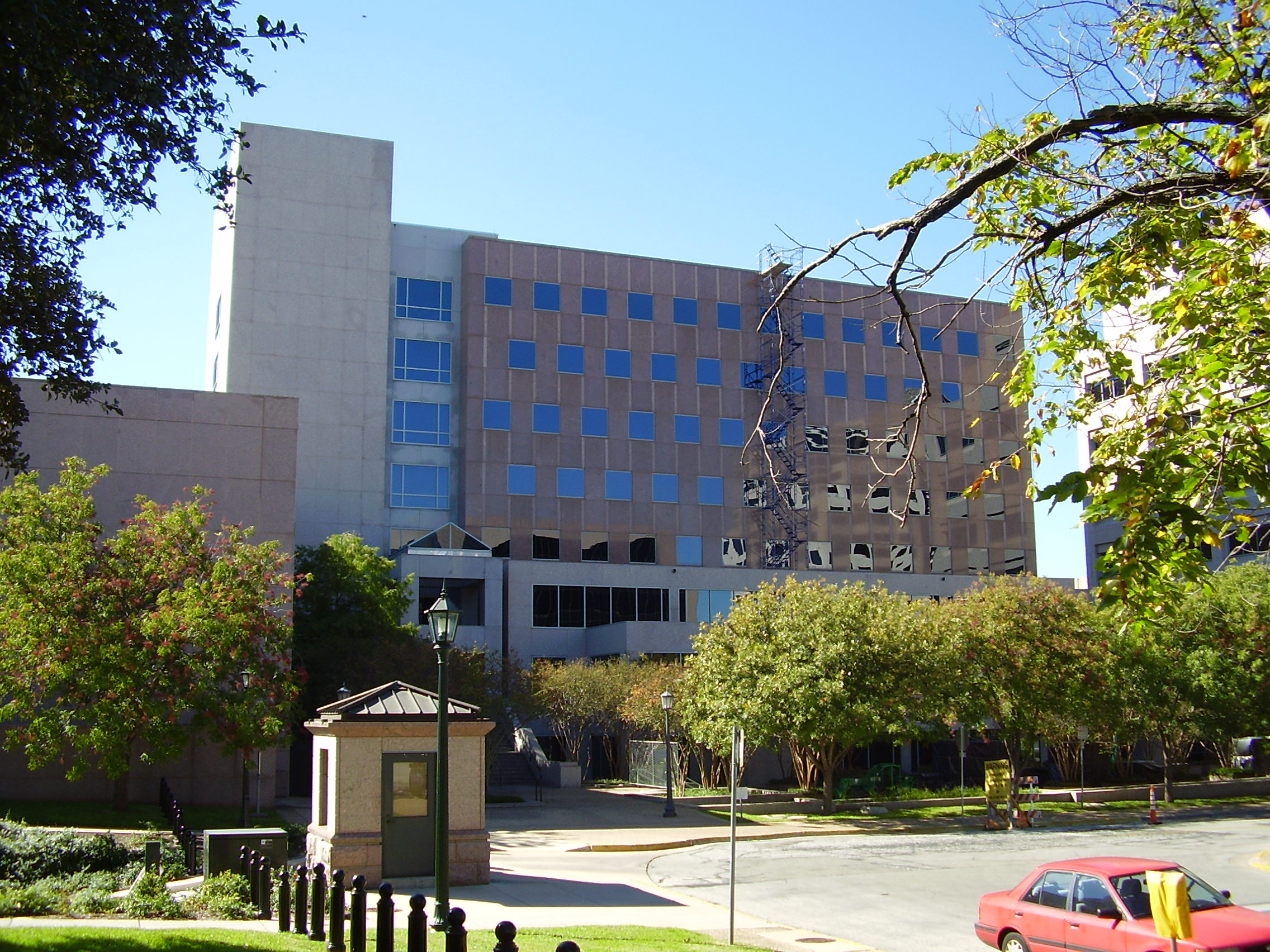
Tom C. Clark State Office Building

The University of Texas's School of Law in Austin maintains an extensive collection (524 linear feet) of Clark's papers, including his Supreme Court files. A smaller collection of Clark's papers, primarily relating to his years as Attorney General, is kept at the Harry S. Truman Library in Independence, Missouri.

The law school named its student lounge after Clark. It awards a tuition subsidy for selected students in his honor.

Other buildings named after Justice Clark include Tom C. Clark Building in Austin, which houses some offices of the Texas Judiciary, and Tom C. Clark High School in San Antonio, Texas' Northside Independent School District. His former law clerks honored him by creating the Tom C. Clark award given to the outstanding Supreme Court Fellow each year. Recipients have included Professor Robert George (McCormick Professor of Jurisprudence, at Princeton University) and Professor Barbara A. Perry (Senior Fellow at the University of Virginia's Miller Center of Public Affairs and former Carter Glass Professor of Government at Sweet Briar College).

Shortly before his death, Clark became the first recipient of the Distinguished Jurist Award at Mississippi State University. Clark also received the Distinguished Eagle Scout Award. In 1975, he received the Golden Plate Award of the American Academy of Achievement.

The Moot Court Honor Board and Suffolk Journal of Trial & Appellate Advocacy of Suffolk University Law School in Boston, Massachusetts, named its prestigious moot court appellate competition after Justice Clark.

== See also ==
- List of justices of the Supreme Court of the United States
- O. John Rogge

== Citations ==
=== Works cited ===
- Cushman, Clare, The Supreme Court Justices: Illustrated Biographies,1789–1995 (2nd ed.) (Supreme Court Historical Society), (Congressional Quarterly Books, 2001) ISBN 1-56802-126-7; ISBN 978-1-56802-126-3
- Gronlund, Mimi Clark (2010). Supreme Court Justice Tom C. Clark: A Life of Service. Austin, TX: University of Texas Press. p. 328. ISBN 978-0-292-71990-3.
- Wohl, Alexander, Father, Son and Constitution – How Justice Tom Clark and Attorney General Ramsey Clark Shaped American Democracy, (Lawrence: University Press of Kansas 2013, 486 pages). ISBN 978-0-7006-1916-0
- Wohl, Alexander, "Mapp v. Ohio Turns 50 – If a moderate Texan could love the exclusionary rule, why can't judicial conservatives?" Slate, June 7, 2011

Legal offices
Preceded by Francis Biddle	United States Attorney General; 1945–1949	Succeeded by Howard McGrath
Preceded by Frank Murphy	Associate Justice of the Supreme Court of the United States; 1949–1967	Succeeded by Thurgood Marshall
Preceded by New office	Director of the Federal Judicial Center; 1968–1970	Succeeded by Alfred P. Murrah
