= SS Cornwallis =

Canadian merchant ship sunk in World War II

History
- Name: Canadian Transporter (1921–1932); Cornwallis (1932–1944)
- Operator: Canadian National Steamships Ltd.
- Port of registry: Vancouver, British Columbia, Canada
- Builder: J. Coughlan & Sons Ltd.
- Yard number: 20
- Launched: 31 August 1921; 105 years ago
- Completed: October 1921
- Out of service: 3 December 1944; 81 years ago
- Identification: Official Number 150448; Code Letters TPWB (1921–1932); Code Letters VGBY (1932–1944)
- Fate: Torpedoed and sunk on 3 December 1944

General characteristics
- Tonnage: 5,458 GRT
- Length: 400 ft 5 in (122.05 m)
- Beam: 52.5 ft (16.0 m)
- Depth: 28.5 ft (8.7 m)
- Propulsion: Triple expansion steam engine
- Speed: 11 knots (20 km/h; 13 mph)
- Crew: 48
- Armament: 1 × QF 4-inch naval gun Mk V; 1 × QF 12-pounder 12 cwt naval gun; 2 × Oerlikon 20 mm cannon >

SS Cornwallis was a 5,438 gross register tons (GRT) steam merchant ship built in 1921 for the Canadian Government as Canadian Transporter. In 1932, she was transferred to Canadian National Steamships Ltd and renamed SS Cornwallis. She was sunk on 3 December 1944 after being torpedoed by the German submarine U-1230 on its way to St John with a loss of 43 crew.

== Construction and design ==
Cornwallis was built by J. Coughlan & Sons in Vancouver. British Columbia, Canada for the Canadian Government as a steam merchant vessel. She was completed in October 1921.

The ship had a length of 400 feet (120 m), a beam of 52.5 feet (16.0 m) and a depth of 28.5 feet (8.7 m). She had a gross register tonnage of 5,458. As for propulsion, she was powered by a single three-cylinder triple-expansion engine that drove one screw. It developed 370 horsepower (280 kW) of which provided Cornwallis a top speed of 11 knots (20 km/h; 13 mph).

== History ==
From 1921 to 1932, Canadian Transporter was owned by the Canadian Government. In 1932, she was transferred to the Canadian National Steamships Ltd and was renamed Cornwallis.

=== 1938 Supreme Court of Canada Case ===
On 6 November 1935, a crew member was severely injured after a wave struck the deck of Cornwallis. The operator Canadian National Steamships Ltd was taken to court and was sued for CAD4,000 in damages.

=== 1942 first U-boat attack ===
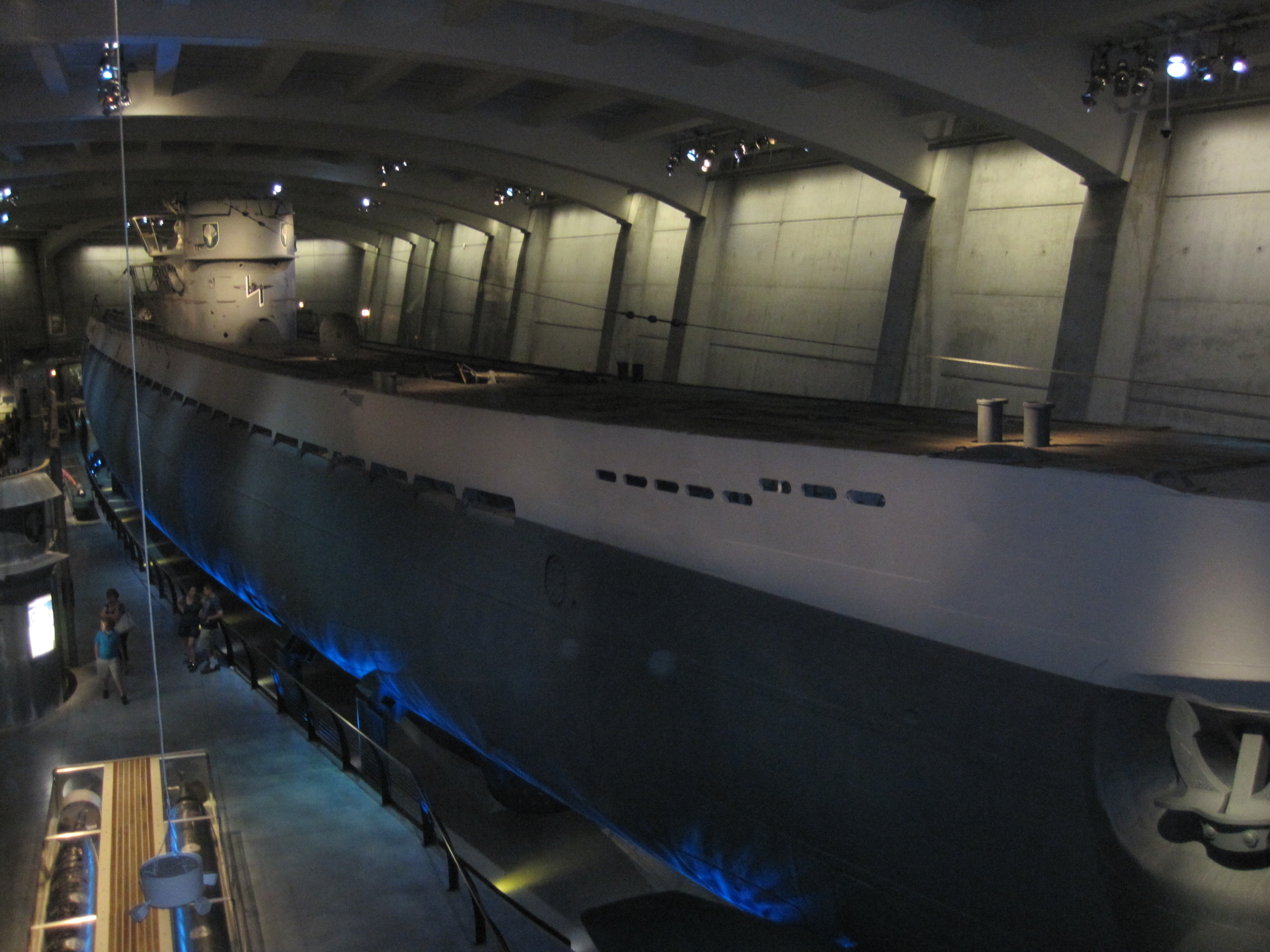
A Type IXC U-boat similar to U-514 that attacked Cornwallis on 11 September 1942

On 11 September 1942, while anchored at Carlisle Bay, Bridgetown, Barbados, she was fired upon by U-514 with multiple G7e torpedoes at a distance of 2,400 yards (2,200 m). Although the majority of the torpedoes were caught by the harbour's torpedo net, a single torpedo managed to breach the net and hit Cornwallis just abreast of the #2 hold. The ship sunk only partially, due to its location in shallow waters. She was raised, patched temporarily, and towed to the Swan Hunter shipyard at Chaguaramas, Trinidad, and then towed again to Mobile on 24 January 1943. Repairs were finished in August 1943 and the ship subsequently returned to service.

=== 1944 second U-boat attack and sinking ===
On 20 November 1944, Cornwallis left Barbados with a cargo of sugar and molasses. She left port with a crew complement of 48 including seven armed guards and a Distressed British Seaman (DBS). The ship's captain, Emerson Robinson, was instructed to sail unescorted through the Cape Cod Canal and then up the coast of New England before finally arriving at their destination Saint John.

On 3 December 1944, she was spotted and fired upon by U-1230. At 06:00, a single torpedo struck the forward section of the ship. An SOS radio call was sent out by the crew and was received at Yarmouth, Nova Scotia.

The crew attempted to lower the amidships lifeboat on the starboard side but the lifeboat was caught on the davits rendering it unusable. The ship sank on her starboard side in under 10 minutes. Of the 48 crew members, six escaped the sinking vessel and made their way to a lifeboat which had floated free when the vessel sunk. The survivors were later picked up by the fishing vessel Notre Dame with one perishing en route due to hypothermia. The five survivors were dropped off at Rockland, Maine.

== Official numbers and code letters ==
Official numbers were a forerunner to IMO Numbers. Cornwallis had an official number of 150448 and the Code Letters TPWB. In 1932 her code letters were changed to VGBY.

== Wreckage ==
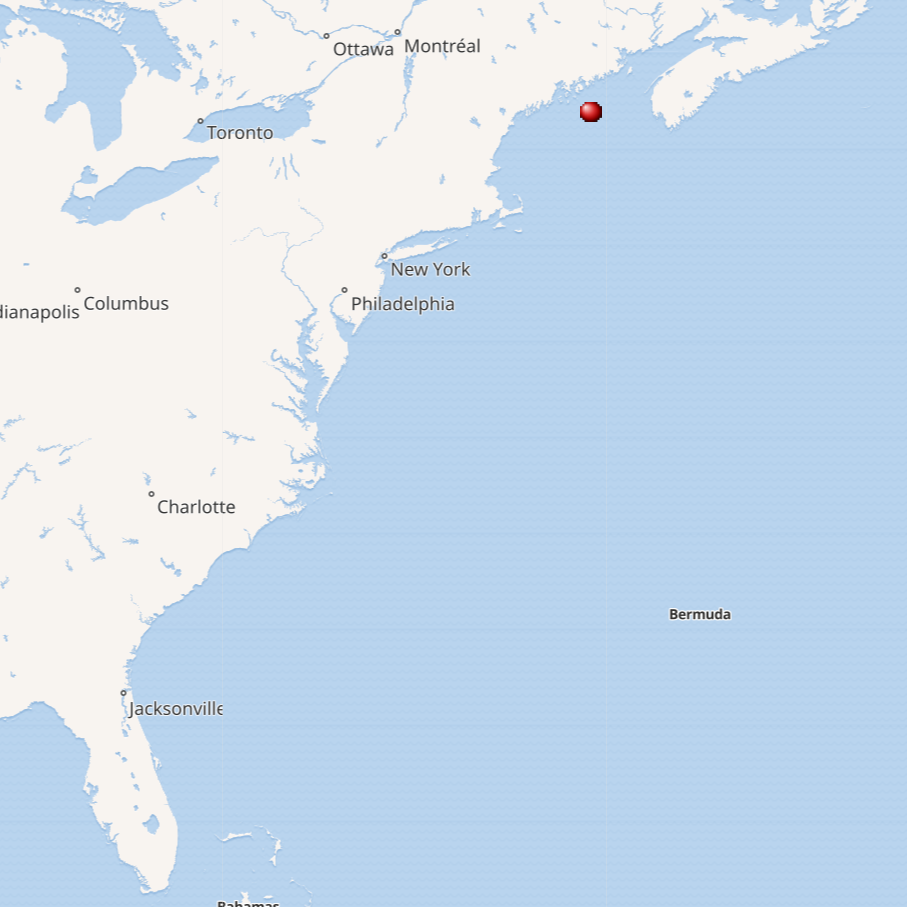
Location of the sinking of SS Cornwallis

The wreckage of Cornwallis can be found nearly 400 feet (120 m) beneath the ocean 10 miles (16 km) southwest of Mount Desert Rock in the Gulf of Maine. The coordinates of the wreckage are located approximately at 43.59°N 68.20°W. Its wreckage was found by a civilian dive team in July 2026.

== See also ==
- The Canadian Merchant Navy in World War II
