= German submarine U-1230 =

German World War II submarine

History

Nazi Germany
- Name: U-1230
- Ordered: 14 October 1941
- Builder: Deutsche Werft, Hamburg
- Yard number: 393
- Laid down: 15 March 1943
- Launched: 8 November 1943
- Commissioned: 26 January 1944
- Fate: Surrendered on 5 May 1945; Sunk on 17 December 1945 during Operation Deadlight

General characteristics
- Class & type: Type IXC/40 submarine
- Displacement: 1,144 t (1,126 long tons) surfaced; 1,257 t (1,237 long tons) submerged
- Length: 76.76 m (251 ft 10 in) o/a; 58.75 m (192 ft 9 in) pressure hull
- Beam: 6.86 m (22 ft 6 in) o/a; 4.44 m (14 ft 7 in) pressure hull
- Height: 9.60 m (31 ft 6 in)
- Draught: 4.67 m (15 ft 4 in)
- Installed power: 4,400 PS (3,200 kW; 4,300 bhp) (diesels); 1,000 PS (740 kW; 990 shp) (electric)
- Propulsion: 2 shafts; 2 × diesel engines; 2 × electric motors
- Speed: 18.3 knots (33.9 km/h; 21.1 mph) surfaced; 7.3 knots (13.5 km/h; 8.4 mph) submerged
- Range: 13,850 nmi (25,650 km; 15,940 mi) at 10 knots (19 km/h; 12 mph) surfaced; 63 nmi (117 km; 72 mi) at 4 knots (7.4 km/h; 4.6 mph) submerged
- Test depth: 230 m (750 ft)
- Complement: 4 officers, 44 enlisted
- Armament: 6 × torpedo tubes (4 bow, 2 stern); 22 × 53.3 cm (21 in) torpedoes; 1 × 3.7 cm (1.5 in) Flak M42 AA gun; 2 x twin 2 cm (0.79 in) C/30 AA guns

Service record
- Part of: 31st U-boat Flotilla; 26 January – 31 July 1944; 10th U-boat Flotilla; 1 August – 30 September 1944; 33rd U-boat Flotilla; 1 October 1944 – 5 May 1945
- Identification codes: M 42 644
- Commanders: Kptlt. Hans Hilbig; 26 January 1944 – 5 May 1945
- Operations: 1 patrol: a. 8 October 1944 – 13 February 1945; b. 20 – 23 February 1945
- Victories: 1 merchant ship sunk (5,458 GRT)

German submarine U-1230 was a Type IXC/40 U-boat of Nazi Germany's Kriegsmarine during World War II.

Laid down on 15 March 1943 at the Deutsche Werft in Hamburg, and commissioned on 26 January 1944 under the command of Kapitänleutnant Hans Hilbig, it only undertook one patrol, operating from Horten Naval Base, Norway, returning safely to Kristiansand, Norway in early 1945.

== Design ==
German Type IXC/40 submarines were slightly larger than the original Type IXCs. U-1230 had a displacement of 1,144 tonnes (1,126 long tons) when at the surface and 1,257 tonnes (1,237 long tons) while submerged. The U-boat had a total length of 76.76 m (251 ft 10 in), a pressure hull length of 58.75 m (192 ft 9 in), a beam of 6.86 m (22 ft 6 in), a height of 9.60 m (31 ft 6 in), and a draught of 4.67 m (15 ft 4 in). The submarine was powered by two MAN M 9 V 40/46 supercharged four-stroke, nine-cylinder diesel engines producing a total of 4,400 metric horsepower (3,240 kW; 4,340 shp) for use while surfaced, two Siemens-Schuckert 2 GU 345/34 double-acting electric motors producing a total of 1,000 shaft horsepower (1,010 PS; 750 kW) for use while submerged. She had two shafts and two 1.92 m (6 ft) propellers. The boat was capable of operating at depths of up to 230 metres (750 ft).

The submarine had a maximum surface speed of 18.3 knots (33.9 km/h; 21.1 mph) and a maximum submerged speed of 7.3 knots (13.5 km/h; 8.4 mph). When submerged, the boat could operate for 63 nautical miles (117 km; 72 mi) at 4 knots (7.4 km/h; 4.6 mph); when surfaced, she could travel 13,850 nautical miles (25,650 km; 15,940 mi) at 10 knots (19 km/h; 12 mph). U-1230 was fitted with six 53.3 cm (21 in) torpedo tubes (four fitted at the bow and two at the stern), 22 torpedoes, and a 3.7 cm (1.5 in) Flak M42 as well as two twin 2 cm (0.79 in) C/30 anti-aircraft guns. The boat had a complement of forty-eight.

== Service history ==
Its one war patrol was of historical interest less for its role in the Battle of the Atlantic (a Canadian steamer of 5,458 Gross register tonnage was its sole victim), than for its role in transporting two German spies to the United States.

=== Operation Magpie ===
William Curtis Colepaugh and Eric Gimpel were landed at Hancock Point in the Gulf of Maine on 29 November 1944 in Operation Elster ("Magpie"). The mission was intended to gather technical intelligence but failed, and both spies were captured.

=== Fate ===
At the end of the war it was captured by the Allies, transferred to Loch Ryan in Scotland, and sunk on 17 December 1945 by the Royal Navy frigate HMS Cubitt as part of "Operation Deadlight". Unusually for a U-boat, U-1230 does not seem to have suffered any casualties during the war.

== Summary of raiding history ==
Date	Ship Name	Nationality	Tonnage (GRT)	Fate
3 December 1944	Cornwallis	Canada	5,458	Sunk

== Bibliography ==
- Busch, Rainer; Röll, Hans-Joachim (1999). German U-boat commanders of World War II : a biographical dictionary. Translated by Brooks, Geoffrey. London, Annapolis, Md: Greenhill Books, Naval Institute Press. ISBN 1-55750-186-6.
- Busch, Rainer; Röll, Hans-Joachim (1999). Deutsche U-Boot-Verluste von September 1939 bis Mai 1945 [German U-boat losses from September 1939 to May 1945]. Der U-Boot-Krieg (in German). Vol. IV. Hamburg, Berlin, Bonn: Mittler. ISBN 3-8132-0514-2.
- Gröner, Erich; Jung, Dieter; Maass, Martin (1991). German Warships 1815–1945, U-boats and Mine Warfare Vessels. Vol. 2. Translated by Thomas, Keith; Magowan, Rachel. London: Conway Maritime Press. ISBN 0-85177-593-4.
