= Spy for Germany =

1956 film

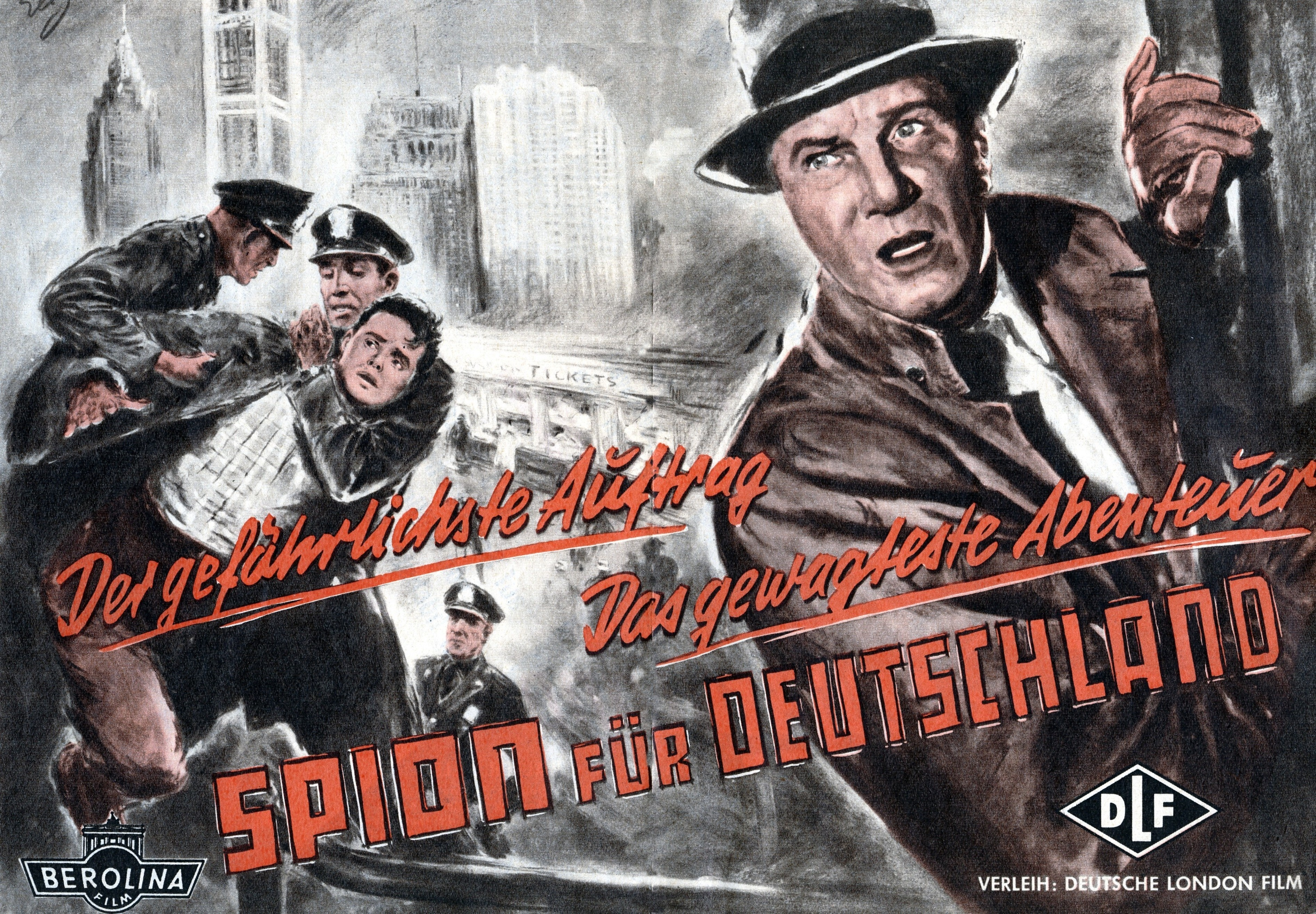
- Martin Held (right) in the poster for Spy for Germany.
- Directed by: Werner Klingler
- Written by: Will Berthold (book); Herbert Reinecker
- Produced by: Kurt Ulrich; Alf Teichs
- Starring: Martin Held; Nadja Tiller; Walter Giller; Viktor Staal
- Cinematography: Albert Benitz; Heinz von Jaworsky
- Edited by: Wolfgang Wehrum
- Music by: Werner Eisbrenner
- Production company: Berolina Film
- Distributed by: Deutsche London Film
- Release date: 4 December 1956
- Running time: 102 minutes
- Country: West Germany
- Language: German

Spy for Germany (German: Spion für Deutschland) is a 1956 West German thriller film directed by Werner Klingler that stars Martin Held, Nadja Tiller and Walter Giller. Based on a book by Will Berthold, the film depicts the mission of a German spy Erich Gimpel during the Second World War to discover how far the American nuclear programme had progressed. It was shot at the Tempelhof Studios in West Berlin and on location in Boston and New York in America. The film's sets were designed by the art directors Hans Kuhnert and Paul Markwitz.

== Plot ==
In 1944, with defeat imminent, German counter-intelligence is desperate to know how soon the US will have nuclear bombs. Experienced agent Erich Gimpel is assigned the mission, but he says he cannot pass as an American. He is partnered with immature American defector Billy Cole and the two are taken to the US East Coast by submarine. Hiding out in a seedy New York hotel, Gimpel tries to find leads to scientists working on the nuclear programme, but his cover is blown when Cole defects back to the FBI.

Gimpel bumps into an old colleague who offers him the use of his empty apartment. This gives him perfect cover to pursue his enquiries, the only flaw being that a key to the apartment has also been given to another friend of the owner. This is Joan Kenneth, an attractive young woman who is setting up a dress shop. She accepts the presence of the mysterious stranger, and begins to fall in love with him.

Gimpel at last gets through to a scientist, who tells him that he is too late as nuclear bombs will very soon be ready to drop on America's enemies. He decides to abandon his mission and defect to South America with Joan. At the airport desk he is arrested and, on being convicted as a spy, sentenced to hang. The death of President Roosevelt is followed by the customary moratorium on executions, so his penalty is commuted to life imprisonment. Joan is ready to wait for him and, when he is released after 11 years, he takes her back to Germany.

== Cast ==
- Martin Held as Erich Gimpel
- Nadja Tiller as Joan Kenneth
- Walter Giller as Billy Cole
- Viktor Staal as Oberst Sommerfeld
- Claude Farell as Inge Hagen
- Gustav Knuth as Roger Bentley
- Heinz Drache as Jim Newman
- Stanislav Ledinek as Mr. Brown
- Martin Kosleck as Griffins
- Günter Pfitzmann as Korvettenkapitän Hilbig
- Ernst Stahl-Nachbaur as Atomprofessor
