= Hancock, Maine =

Town in Maine, United States

- Town
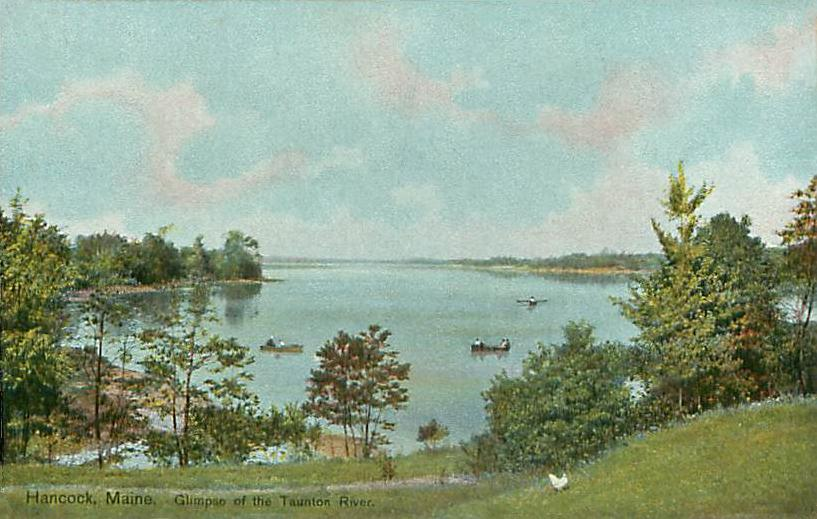
- Taunton Bay in 1908

- Location within Maine Location within the United States
- Coordinates: 44°31′28″N 68°16′59″W
- Country: United States
- State: Maine
- County: Hancock
- Incorporated: 1828
- Villages: Hancock; Franklin Road; Hancock Point; South Hancock

Area
  - Total: 38.87 sq mi (100.67 km^{2})
  - Land: 30.04 sq mi (77.80 km^{2})
  - Water: 8.83 sq mi (22.87 km^{2})
- Elevation: 39 ft (12 m)

Population (2020)
  - Total: 2,466
  - Density: 31.7/sq mi (12.2/km^{2})
- Time zone: UTC-5 (Eastern (EST))
  - Summer (DST): UTC-4 (EDT)
- ZIP code: 04640
- Area code: 207
- FIPS code: 23-30970
- GNIS feature ID: 582509
- Website: Town of Hancock, Maine

Hancock is a town in Hancock County, Maine, United States. The population was 2,466 at the 2020 census.

== History ==
Hancock was settled in 1766 by Philip and S. Hodgkins from Georgetown, Maine, formed from portions of Sullivan, Trenton, and Plantation No. 8. The town was incorporated by the state legislature on February 21, 1828 and named for John Hancock, signer of the Declaration of Independence. The Kilkenny and Egypt streams offered water power for mills. There was one gristmill, four shingle mills, and four lath mills. Other products included barrel staves, lumber, boots, shoes, wagons, and sleighs. Many inhabitants were engaged in seafaring, particularly fishing at the Grand Banks.

During World War II, German spies Erich Gimpel and William Colepaugh landed by submarine in Hancock, then traveled to New York City. They were eventually captured, tried, and sentenced to death, but their sentences were commuted and they were eventually released.

== Geography ==
According to the United States Census Bureau, the town has a total area of 38.87 square miles (100.67 km^{2}), of which 30.04 square miles (77.80 km^{2}) is land and 8.83 square miles (22.87 km^{2}) is water. Drained by the Kilkenny Stream and Egypt Stream, Hancock is situated on Skillings River, Taunton Bay and Frenchman Bay, part of the Atlantic Ocean.

The town is crossed by U. S. Route 1 and State Route 182. It borders the towns of Lamoine to the south, Ellsworth to the west, T8 SD to the north, Franklin to the east, and (separated by Taunton Bay and Frenchman's Bay) is near Sullivan and Sorrento to the southeast.

The Municipality (the entirety of the Town's area) is considered, generally, to be divided into distinct areas:

Waukeag Neck—which includes the villages of neighborhoods of Hancock Point, Mount Desert Ferry, East Hancock ("Eastside"), South Hancock ("Westside" or "Westshore"), Waukeag Station Crossing, and the Town proper (Hancock Village). "The Neck" is bounded by the Taunton River to the northeast, Frenchman's Bay to the south, and Carrying Place Creek to the due west.

Mid-Hancock or Hancock Hills—which includes the villages or neighborhoods of Carrying Place Creek, Havey Point, Hyde Point, Hancock Hill (ORO or Old Route One Hill) and Franklin Roads. The area is largely coterminous with US Route One (US1 East) and is bounded by the Carrying Place Creek, Rte 1, and the Kilkenny Stream at Mud Creek Road.

Mud Creek—one of the smaller sections of town, the area abuts Kilkenny Stream and Pinkham Flats, adjacent to the town of Lamoine and includes the Mud Creek Marsh. This section includes neighborhoods such as Upper Mud Creek & Kilkenny Cove.

Northside—bounded by Egypt Stream, Hog Bay, and Route 182, the area includes the neighborhoods and hamlets of Castle Grove (also known as Austinwood, Austin Castle, and Castle Road), West Egypt, Franklin Roads North, Blease Hill, Spring Pond, and Deerfields.

Western Hancock—the larger chunk of the town's land area is adjacent to the City of Ellsworth and is generally thought to begin at the junction of Mud Creek Road and terminate at Washington Junction Rd and the city limits of Ellsworth and the town line with Lamoine. The area includes the neighborhoods of Washington Junction, Hancock Heights, Crescent Heights, and White Birches.

The summer colony of Hancock Point includes historic properties such as the Crocker House Country Inn and summer cottages.

Hancock Village includes several historic properties such as Ironbound Inn & Restaurant (formerly Le Domaine) and the Pierre Monteaux School. The village also includes commercial, administrative, and social facilities, such as the Grammar School, Hancock Congregational Church, the US Postal Service, the Municipal Hall, among others.

The Town serves as one of the crossroads of Eastern Maine, being adjacent to the Mount Desert Island, Ellsworth, Schoodic Peninsula, and Schoodic Foothills / Hog Bay Areas. With a number of scenic spots overlooking MDI, Taunton & Frenchman's Bay, in addition to its location at the center of the region, Hancock is a basecamp for travelers and tourists. Two of Acadia National Park's most popular districts, Mount Desert Island and Schoodic Point, are approximately equidistant. The Island Explorer's Downeast & Peninsula Routes pass through the community, connecting Bar Harbor, Ellsworth, and Winter Harbor.

== Demographics ==
Historical population
Census	Pop.	Note	%±
1790	278		—
1830	653		—
1840	760		16.4%
1850	960		26.3%
1860	923		−3.9%
1870	974		5.5%
1880	1,093		12.2%
1890	1,190		8.9%
1900	900		−24.4%
1910	843		−6.3%
1920	770		−8.7%
1930	760		−1.3%
1940	761		0.1%
1950	755		−0.8%
1960	806		6.8%
1970	1,070		32.8%
1980	1,409		31.7%
1990	1,757		24.7%
2000	2,147		22.2%
2010	2,394		11.5%
2020	2,466		3.0%
U.S. Decennial Census

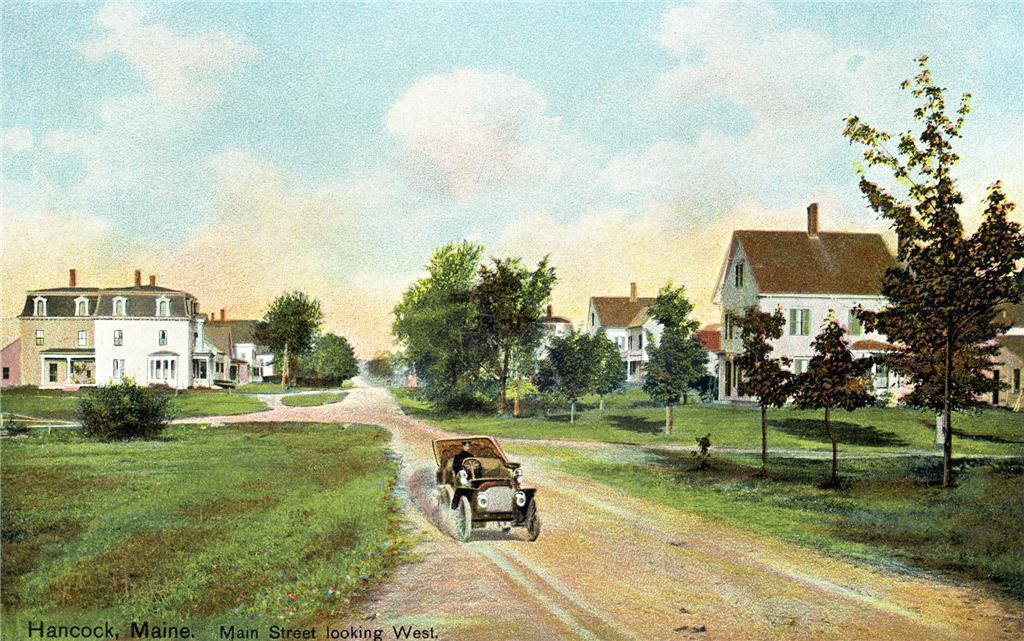
Street scene c. 1908

=== 2010 census ===
As of the census of 2010, there were 2,394 people, 1,044 households, and 670 families living in the town. The population density was 79.7 inhabitants per square mile (30.8/km^{2}). There were 1,437 housing units at an average density of 47.8 per square mile (18.5/km^{2}). The racial makeup of the town was 96.6% White, 0.5% African American, 0.5% Native American, 0.7% Asian, 0.2% from other races, and 1.6% from two or more races. Hispanic or Latino of any race were 1.3% of the population.

There were 1,044 households, of which 29.1% had children under the age of 18 living with them, 49.4% were married couples living together, 9.8% had a female householder with no husband present, 5.0% had a male householder with no wife present, and 35.8% were non-families. 28.4% of all households were made up of individuals, and 12.6% had someone living alone who was 65 years of age or older. The average household size was 2.28 and the average family size was 2.73.

The median age in the town was 44 years. 20% of residents were under the age of 18; 7.5% were between the ages of 18 and 24; 23.8% were from 25 to 44; 30.8% were from 45 to 64; and 17.8% were 65 years of age or older. The gender makeup of the town was 48.7% male and 51.3% female.

=== 2000 census ===
As of the census of 2000, there were 2,147 people, 927 households, and 596 families living in the town. The population density was 72.0 inhabitants per square mile (27.8/km^{2}). There were 1,200 housing units at an average density of 40.2 per square mile (15.5/km^{2}). The racial makeup of the town was 97.39% White, 0.33% African American, 0.42% Native American, 0.47% Asian, 0.05% Pacific Islander, 0.14% from other races, and 1.21% from two or more races. Hispanic or Latino of any race were 0.51% of the population.

There were 927 households, out of which 30.0% had children under the age of 18 living with them, 50.5% were married couples living together, 9.9% had a female householder with no husband present, and 35.6% were non-families. 27.8% of all households were made up of individuals, and 11.7% had someone living alone who was 65 years of age or older. The average household size was 2.31 and the average family size was 2.77.

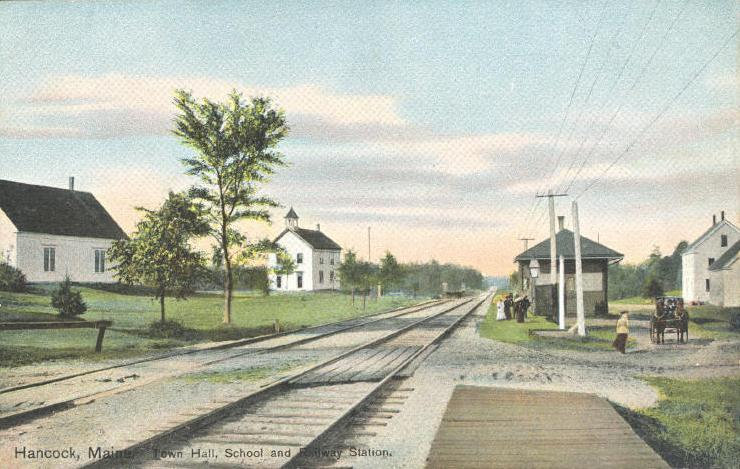
Town hall, school and railway station c. 1908

In the town, the population was spread out, with 23.6% under the age of 18, 6.1% from 18 to 24, 30.5% from 25 to 44, 23.7% from 45 to 64, and 16.2% who were 65 years of age or older. The median age was 39 years. For every 100 females, there were 92.4 males. For every 100 females age 18 and over, there were 91.5 males.

The median income for a household in the town was $32,778, and the median income for a family was $36,855. Males had a median income of $27,448 versus $21,031 for females. The per capita income for the town was $17,339. About 6.9% of families and 9.9% of the population were below the poverty line, including 12.3% of those under age 18 and 8.9% of those age 65 or over.

== Education ==
- Hancock Grammar school
- Pierre Monteux School for Conductors and Orchestra Musicians

== Notable persons ==
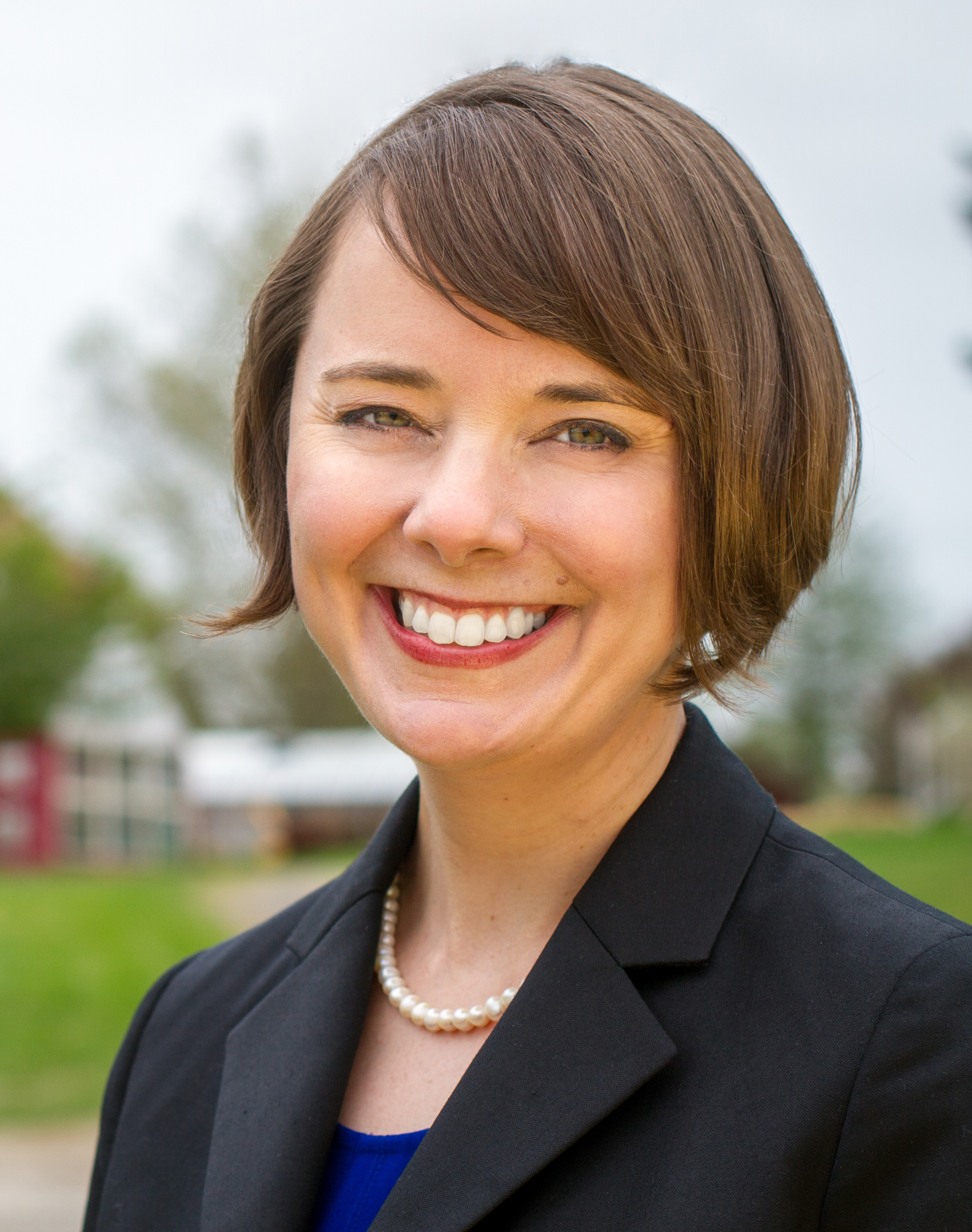
Shenna Bellows

- Shenna Bellows (born 1975), 50th Secretary of State of Maine
- Meredith Ernest "Bud" Bordeaux (1912–2014), Member of the Maine House of Representatives
- Charles Bruck (1911–1995), French-American conductor and teacher, born in the Kingdom of Hungary
- George Haskins (1915–1991), legal scholar and law professor at the University of Pennsylvania Law School
- Jordon Hudson (born 2001), pageant contestant and former cheerleader
- Pierre Monteux (1875–1964), French (later American) conductor; orchestral player
- Samuel French Morse (1916–1985), poet and teacher; the Samuel French Morse Poetry Prize was named in his honor
