= William Colepaugh =

American traitor (1918–2005)

- Born: March 25, 1918; Niantic, Connecticut, U.S.
- Died: March 16, 2005 (aged 86); Paoli, Pennsylvania, U.S.
- Occupations: Able seaman, secret agent
- Spouse: Dolores Campetti
- Parent(s): William C. and Havel G. (Schmidt) Colepaugh
- Status: Deceased
- Convictions: Draft evasion Acting as an unlawful combatant with the intent to commit sabotage, espionage, and other hostile acts Espionage; Conspiracy
- Penalty: Death; commuted to life imprisonment; further commuted to 30 years imprisonment

William Curtis Colepaugh (March 25, 1918 – March 16, 2005) was an American who defected to Nazi Germany in 1944 following his 1943 discharge from the U.S. Naval Reserve. He was a crewman on a repatriation ship that stopped off in Lisbon, at which time he defected at the German consulate. Colepaugh had attended Admiral Farragut Academy in Pine Beach, New Jersey.

== Early life ==
Colepaugh was born in Connecticut. His mother sent him to the Admiral Farragut Academy rather than public school. He later flunked out of the Massachusetts Institute of Technology. Colepaugh was remembered there for being rabidly anti-Semitic. He would launch into a tirade against the Jews at the slightest provocation.

== Secret agent ==
Colepaugh was given extensive firearms and espionage training at a spy-school in The Hague. He spoke virtually no German. He was then transported back to the United States by the U-1230 along with German agent Erich Gimpel, landing at Hancock Point in the Gulf of Maine on 29 November 1944. Their mission under Operation Elster ("Magpie") was to gather technical information on the Allied war effort and transmit it back by morse code radiotelegraphy using a shortwave radio transmitter they were expected to build.

Colepaugh and Gimpel made their way to Boston and then by train to New York. Soon, Colepaugh abandoned the mission, taking $48,000 ($877,900 today) of the currency that they had brought and spending a month partying and carousing with local women. He spent $1,500 ($27,400 today) in less than a month, then visited an old school friend and asked for help to turn himself in to the Federal Bureau of Investigation (FBI), hoping for immunity.

The bureau had already been searching for the two German agents following the sinking of a Canadian ship a few miles from the Maine coastline (indicating a U-boat had been nearby) and reports of suspicious sightings by local residents. The FBI interrogated Colepaugh at the United States Courthouse at Foley Square in New York City, and gained information which then enabled them to track down Gimpel.

The pair were then handed over to U.S. military authorities on the instructions of the Attorney General. In February 1945, they stood trial before a Military Commission, accused of conspiracy and violating the 82nd Article of War. They were both found guilty and sentenced to be hanged. The execution date was set for April 15, 1945, but President Franklin D. Roosevelt unexpectedly died three days before the execution, and all federal executions were put on hold. After the war ended, their sentences were commuted to life imprisonment by President Harry Truman. Gimpel was paroled in 1955; Colepaugh was paroled in 1960.

== Last years ==
After his release, Colepaugh moved to King of Prussia, Pennsylvania where he worked in a print shop. He subsequently owned and operated a retail business that sold office furniture. He married and participated in community activities, volunteered with the Boy Scouts, and became a member of Rotary. He died of complications from Alzheimer's disease in 2005.

Gimpel and Colepaugh are believed to have been the last Nazi German spies in World War II who reached the United States.

== See also ==
- John Codd
- Erich Gimpel
