= Erich Gimpel =

German spy during WWII (1910–2010)

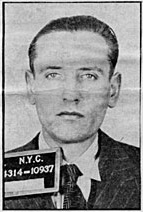
- Born: March 25, 1910; Merseburg, Prussian Saxony, German Empire
- Died: September 3, 2010 (aged 100); São Paulo, Brazil
- Occupations: Radio operator, secret agent
- Status: Deceased
- Convictions: Acting as an unlawful combatant with the intent to commit sabotage, espionage, and other hostile acts Espionage; Conspiracy
- Penalty: Death; commuted to life imprisonment; further commuted to 30 years imprisonment

Erich Gimpel (25 March 1910 – 3 September 2010) was a German spy during World War II. Together with William Colepaugh, he took part in Operation Elster ("Magpie"), an espionage mission to the United States in 1944, but was subsequently captured by the FBI in New York City.

== German secret agent ==
Gimpel had been a radio operator for mining companies in Peru in the 1930s. When World War II began, he became a secret agent, reporting the movement of enemy ships to Germany. When the United States entered the war in December 1941, Gimpel was deported back to Germany. He then served as an agent in Spain.

Gimpel was next chosen to attend a spy-school in Hamburg. His final exam was to infiltrate German-occupied The Hague, where he first met the American malcontent and traitor William Colepaugh, an unstable drifter who would ultimately betray him.

=== Operation Elster ===
Gimpel and Colepaugh were transported from Kiel to the U.S. by the German submarine U-1230, landing at Frenchman Bay in the Gulf of Maine on 29 November 1944. Their mission was to gather technical information on the Allied war effort and transmit it back to Germany using an 80 watt radio transmitter Gimpel was expected to build.

Together they made their way to Boston and then by train to New York. Before long Colepaugh decided to abandon the mission, taking US$48,000 ($877,900 today) of the currency they had brought and spending a month partying and carousing with local women. After spending $1,500 ($27,400 today) in less than a month, Colepaugh visited an old schoolfriend and asked for help to turn himself in to the FBI, hoping for immunity. The FBI was already searching for German agents following the sinking of a Canadian ship a few miles off the Maine coastline (indicating a U-boat had been nearby) and suspicious sightings reported by local residents. The FBI interrogated Colepaugh, who revealed everything, enabling them to track down Gimpel.

== Prisoner of war ==
After Gimpel's capture, the spies were handed over to U.S. military authorities on the instructions of the Attorney General. In February 1945, they stood trial before a military commission, accused of conspiracy and violating the 82nd Article of War. They were found guilty and sentenced to be hanged. An execution date was set for 15 April 1945. However, three days before their scheduled executions, President Franklin D. Roosevelt unexpectedly died. Due to a custom to not hold any executions during a period of state mourning, the executions were delayed. After the war ended, the sentences of both Gimpel and Colepaugh were commuted to life imprisonment.

Gimpel was sent to Alcatraz, where he played chess with Machine Gun Kelly. Gimpel was paroled in 1955, after serving 10 years in prison (Colepaugh would be paroled in 1960) and returned home to West Germany. He would later make his home in South America.

== Post-prison life ==
Gimpel was the last person to be tried before a U.S. military tribunal in the Second World War. His autobiographical account of his undercover work, Spy For Germany, was first published in English in 1957, in Great Britain.

Following the terrorist attacks on the United States in September 2001, several books about Nazi spies in America were published, and his book finally appeared in the U.S. under the title Agent 146 (2003).

Gimpel was interviewed by Oliver North for his Fox News Channel program War Stories with Oliver North in the episode "Agent 146: Spying for the Third Reich".

The 100-year-old Gimpel died in São Paulo, Brazil on 3 September 2010.

== Film ==
Erich Gimpel's career as a spy was dramatized in the 1956 film Spy for Germany (German title: Spion für Deutschland). The actor Martin Held played the leading role.

== See also ==
- John Codd
- William Colepaugh
