= Frank McLardy =

English Nazi collaborator

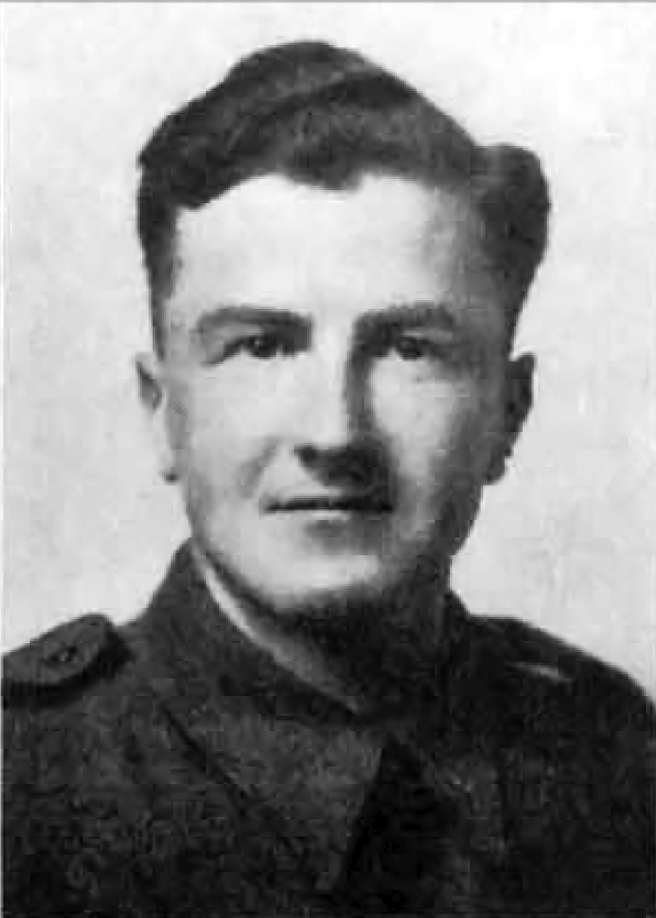
- Born: George Frank McLardy; 17 November 1915; Waterloo, Lancashire, England
- Died: 16 December 1981 (aged 66); Ingelheim am Rhein, Rhineland-Palatinate, West Germany
- Other names: Frank Wood, McLaren, McLeod
- Education: St Edmund's School, Waterloo; St Mary's College, Crosby
- Occupations: British Free Corps; pharmacist
- Political party: British Union of Fascists
- Children: 2

George Frank McLardy MPS (17 November 1915 – 16 December 1981) was a member of the British Union of Fascists, a British Nazi collaborator and an Unterscharführer in the Waffen-SS British Free Corps during the Second World War.

== Early life ==
McLardy was born at 8 Sweden Grove in Waterloo, Lancashire in November 1915, the eldest son of a draper, George McLardy, and his wife Mary (née Wood) McLardy. He had two younger brothers. He attended St Edmund's School, Waterloo and St Mary's College, Crosby, where he was a member of the First XV rugby and First XI cricket teams. Academically bright, McLardy progressed into St Mary's College Sixth Form.

Upon leaving school in 1934 he studied pharmacy at the Liverpool School of Pharmacy. McLardy subsequently moved with his family to live in nearby Formby, where he was articled to a chemist. He qualified as a Member of the Pharmaceutical Society in October 1939.

That same year he joined the British Union of Fascists (BUF), becoming first district treasurer, then district leader in Waterloo. McLardy sold the BUF magazine Action around Crosby and Waterloo, and held his BUF meetings in a local public house, The Crosby Hotel. The intelligence service MI5 began monitoring his activities in July 1937.

== World War II ==
On the outbreak of World War II, McLardy volunteered for the Royal Army Medical Corps. He was posted to Aldershot, and owing to his qualifications, was promoted to the rank of sergeant. On 9 May 1940, he landed in France with the British Expeditionary Force. After pushing as far north as Brussels, his unit was beaten back by the Germans towards Dunkirk.

McLardy was captured near Wormhoudt on 31 May 1940. It was suspected that he deliberately became separated from his unit to be captured. He was sent first to Stalag XX-A at Thorn, and soon on to Stalag XXI-A at Schildberg (both in Poland). For three years McLardy remained in Schildberg as an ordinary prisoner of war, performing medical duties for his fellow prisoners in the camp hospital.

Around this time McLardy began complaining of "heart trouble" and "ear problems." He hoped for repatriation to the UK. His hopes were dashed in September 1943, however, when he was told that instead he would be moving to Stalag XXI-D at Posen, reputedly the worst camp in Poland.

=== Collaboration ===
McLardy claimed that he "would not survive another Polish winter", and recalled a conversation with a "Dutch officer" in Stalag XXI-A who stated that he had applied to join the Waffen-SS with a view to ultimately escape. McLardy approached a surprised Abwehr officer at Schildberg with the request that he might join the Waffen-SS. His application, written in his own hand in English was translated into German, then typed and forwarded to Berlin.

It stated "I hereby apply to offer my services to Germany in the common struggle against Bolshevism and I express my willingness to serve as a soldier against Soviet Russia." Frank McLardy thus became the first British POW of World War II to volunteer to join the German armed forces. A reply was received three weeks later when an Abwehr guard arrived at the camp to escort him to Berlin.

=== British Free Corps ===
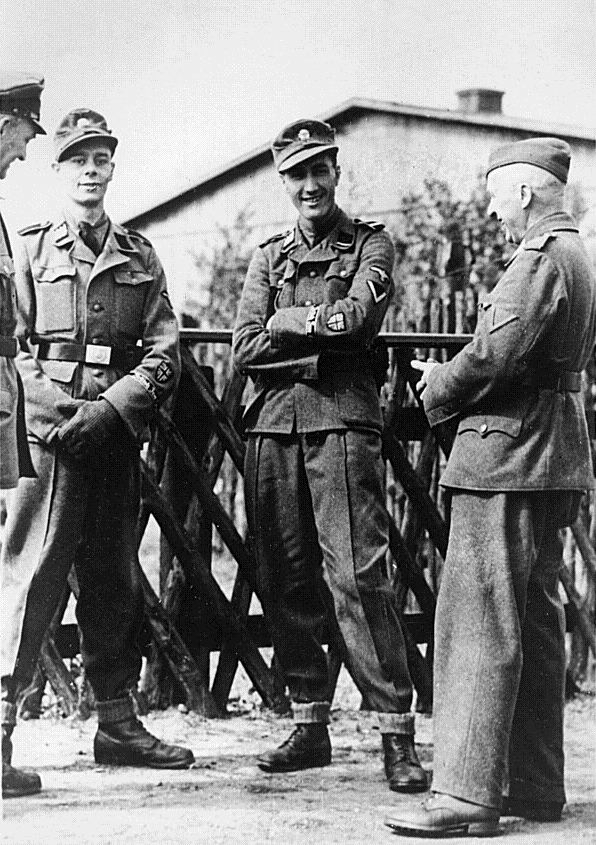
Two early members of the BFC, SS-Mann Kenneth Berry and Sturmmann Alfred Minchin, with German officers, April 1944

McLardy was taken first to Stalag IIID/517S at Genshagen, south of Berlin. This was a "holiday" or Propaganda Camp established by the Germans in early 1943. Batches of prisoners from other camps were regularly sent there and offered special privileges in an attempt to undermine their loyalty.

A recurring dream of Hitler's was the propaganda value of a battalion of British POWs who might be persuaded to go into battle against the Russians. An early attempt at recruitment had ended in abject failure. The Legion of St George had been the brainchild of John Amery. He toured the internment camps of France, distributing leaflets entitled "Why die for Stalin? Why die for the Jews?"

His only recruit was Kenneth Berry, a 17-year-old deckhand from a sunken ammunition ship, and Amery was soon sidelined by the Germans. But a group of men at Stalag IIID now caught the Germans' eye as the potential nucleus for another attempt to form such a foreign legion. Soon to be known as the "Big Six", they were William Brittain, New Zealander Roy Courlander, Canadian Edwin Barnard Martin, Seaman Alfred Minchin and McLardy.

These men were packed off to a requisitioned bierkeller in Pankow, Berlin and placed under the tutelage of Thomas Haller Cooper, a half-German who had already served in the SS Totenkopf and SS Polizei Division and boasted of committing atrocities against Jews and Russian POWs in Poland. The group decided among themselves to change the name of the Legion to the British Free Corps and soon set about designing uniforms and recruitment leaflets.

McLardy was given the rank of SS-Unterscharführer, and put in charge of propaganda. Most members of the BFC changed their names on enlistment, and McLardy went under his mother's surname of Wood. He regularly travelled to prisoner of war camps, dressed as a civilian, dropping off leaflets and interviewing likely recruits, claiming that there were two full divisions of the BFC – one, led by British officers, supposedly already fighting the Russians with the approval of the British government.

In expectation of a surge of recruits, in February 1944 the BFC were moved to an SS barracks at Hildesheim, a former monastery converted into the SS Nordic Study Centre. The optimistic Germans had 800 Waffen-SS uniforms made, sporting a collar patch with three lions, and a union jack shield on the sleeve together with a "British Free Corps" armband in Gothic script.

Recruits, many realising they had been duped, were subjected to lectures from McLardy on Economics, Bolshevism and the German language, and forced to give Nazi salutes to McLardy and the other ringleaders of the BFC. He would later be described by them as "capable and intelligent", a "fanatical fascist", who "hoped for a fascist England", but "a physical and moral coward", "very anti-Jewish and anti-Russian", "a very learned man of high education", "reserved", but who when aroused "would talk for hours on National Socialism."

Some members of the BFC stayed in it merely for an easy time, the beer and the chance to fraternise with local women. Others attempted to sabotage it, or demanded to be sent back to their POW camps. A schism developed in April 1944, when a group took exception to McLardy's increasingly pro-Nazi, anti-British harangues, and a fist-fight ensued. Thereafter McLardy, Courlander and Co. slept in a separate room, under pictures of Hitler, Himmler and the Nazi flag, while newer recruits occupied a room in which a picture of the Duke of Windsor had pride of place.

On Hitler's birthday, 20 April 1944, the BFC paraded in full uniform for the first time. The Corps continued to be riven by intrigue with Cooper, McLardy and Courlander all jockeying for control, at odds among themselves and with their German masters. Fewer than 60 men ever joined the BFC and its strength never rose above 27, three below the number Hitler had stipulated as the minimum for it to go into battle. By August 1944, McLardy, realising the British Free Corps was a failure, decided to abandon it and volunteered for the Waffen-SS Sanitätswesen (Medical Corps).

=== Waffen-SS ===
He was posted to the SS medical supply depot at Lichtenberg, and in his own words "wore an ordinary SS uniform and lived the life of a German soldier." Towards the end of 1944, McLardy was selected for officer training. He was sent first to Graz, then to Stettin to commence his training. He realised the end of the war was near, and had no intention of becoming part of a last-ditch effort of the SS to defend the Third Reich. On reporting to Stettin in January 1945 he reported sick and was excused duties, and allowed to return to Berlin.

McLardy went to the SS Head Office and was offered work at the Rundfunkhaus and with the SS-Standarte Kurt Eggers. Desiring neither, he managed to dupe the SS into granting him leave, each department thinking he had accepted the other. McLardy donned civilian clothes and went to ground in Berlin, living at 33 Sächsische Strasse, while he plotted his escape from the crumbling capital.

In early April he learned that the Propaganda Ministry's Büro Concordia was abandoning Berlin for Helmstedt, and persuaded them to take him along. He declined the job of broadcaster, but instead offered to "monitor" Allied broadcasts. McLardy left Berlin on 10 April 1945. By the time they reached Helmstedt the Reich was falling apart, and after a week McLardy told his associates he was heading for Hamburg.

Instead, he posed as a Belgian, and after hiding on a farm at Döhren for two days, surrendered to the arriving Americans. He was handed into British custody on 19 April 1945 and repatriated to the UK on 13 May 1945.

== Post-war ==
McLardy was charged with voluntarily aiding the enemy whilst a prisoner of war. He was court-martialled at Blacon Camp, near Chester and sentenced to life imprisonment on 1 January 1946.

Security Service files on him are held by the National Archives under references KV 2/251 and KV 2/252. The sentence was later commuted to 15 years, of which McLardy served seven. McLardy received the heaviest sentence of those convicted of membership of the British Free Corps. He served his sentence first at HM Prison Parkhurst, then in open prisons. During his imprisonment McLardy studied for an external degree in chemistry from Cambridge University.

== Last years ==
Upon his release in 1953, he emigrated to Germany, married a German woman and had two sons. He worked as a pharmacist and died in 1981 at Ingelheim am Rhein, near Mainz, aged 66.

== Gallery ==
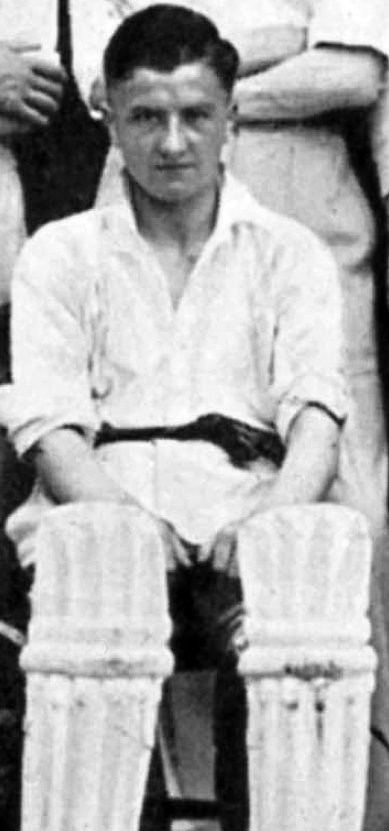
Frank McLardy, St Mary's College First XI cricket team, 1934

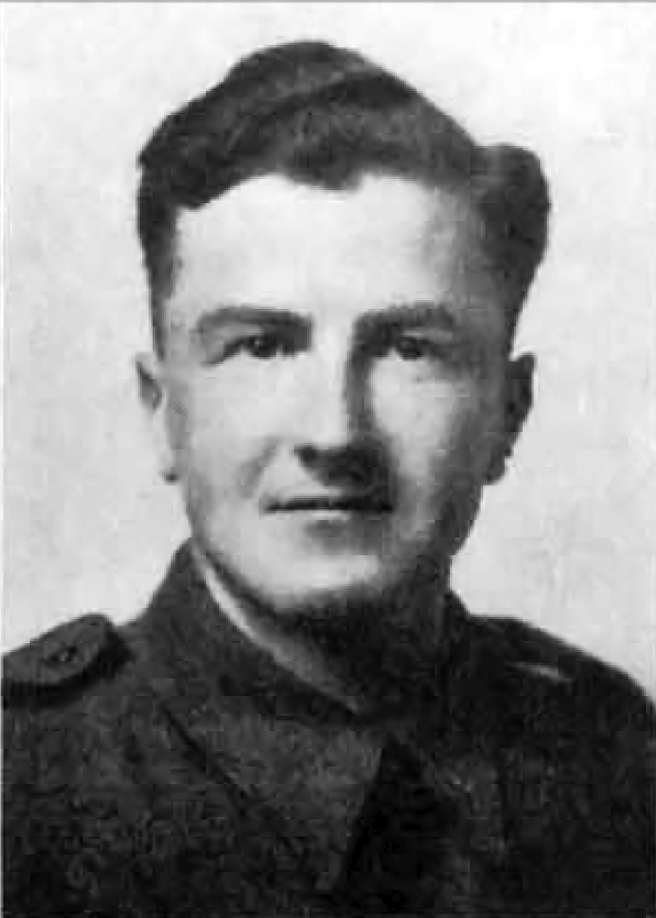
Sergeant McLardy in RAMC uniform, 1940

== See also ==
- British Free Corps
- List of members of the British Free Corps
- Douglas Berneville-Claye (1917–1975), English Nazi collaborator, subject of self-aggrandisement.
- Thomas Haller Cooper (1919–c. 1990), English Nazi collaborator, prosecuted for high treason.
- Roy Courlander (1914–1970), WW2 New Zealand lance corporal charged with treason.
- John Amery (1912–1945), English fascist and Nazi collaborator, prosecuted for treason.
