= List of members of the British Free Corps =

The Corps (German: Britisches Freikorps) was a unit of the Waffen SS during World War II consisting of British and Dominion prisoners of war who had been recruited by the Nazis. The Corps used the SS rank structure. The column 'MI5 no.' refers to the number allocated to the member in question in MI5's Report on the British Free Corps dated 27 March 1945, which is printed in Appendix 1 of 'Renegades'. Starting in February 1944, BFC members were ordered to adopt aliases for official purposes, although several declined to do so.

After the War, some members of the Corps were prosecuted. Of those members, those who had been serving in the armed forces were court-martialed, while the merchant seamen and other civilians were tried in the Old Bailey. The column 'Seymer Category' refers to a list prepared by Colonel Vivian Home Seymer of MI5 on 30 August 1945 and which is held in file KV 2/2828, entitled 'The British Free Corps. Papers about the military unit established by the German authorities to exploit renegade British prisoners of war' in the National Archives.

Another list, containing at least 165 names, appears in Richard Landwehr, Britisches Freikorps PP77–88, Lulu, 2008. ISBN 0-5570-3362-4. However the author records many members of the Corps separately under their real names and their aliases, as set out in the list below:

- Wilhelm August 'Bob' Rössler (4), Walter Plauen (100) (an alias used in 'Jackals of the Reich' PP 20 ff for "Hauptmann Werner Plack of the England Committee … Amery's aide-cum-minder") and ‘Fred’ Stürmer (156) (who appears on page 106 of 'Jackals of the Reich' as Captain Harry Mehner (106)) who were Germans connected with the Corps.
- Men who served in other German units (see list below), without citing any reference stating that they were also in the British Free Corps.
- John Amery (1), George Logio (86) and Maurice Tunmer (90), who were involved with the 'Legion of St George', a forerunner of the Corps 'Tunmer, through contacts in the French Resistance, was organizing a journey across the Pyrenees so that he could travel to Britain and join de Gaulle's Free French forces in England.'
- Raymond Davies Hughes (47), Arthur Chapple (52), Carl Hoskins (159), R. Spillman (161), William Humphrey Griffiths (163) who were 'Service renegades [who had] been employed in editing, writing scripts, and broadcasting for the enemy, and in certain cases the same men [were] also employed in journalism'. – this category also covers Railton Freeman and Walter Purdy who also served in the SS-Standarte Kurt Eggers.
- Gordon Bowler (20), John Henry Owen Brown DCM (49) (a British espionage agent), Douglas Maylin (76), Joseph Trinder (84) and RAF Bombardier Marshall (85), who had all been on the ‘staff’ at a 'holiday camp' set up by the Germans in Genshagen, a suburb of Berlin, in August 1943 – Maylin decided to join the Corps but was prevented from doing so by Thomas Haller Cooper.
- Sgt. Cushing (60), Pte. Walsh (61), Pte. O’Brien (62) and Pte. Murphy (63), "four Irishmen who ... eventually found themselves incarcerated in a special compound of Sachsenhausen concentration camp as German doubts about their essential loyalties grew. The Germans were right to be sceptical: none of the four had any real intention of working for the Nazis ... they finished the war with no stain on their characters." See Friesack Camp#Training.
- John Welch (92), who was on the 'staff' of an interrogation camp at Luckenwalde.
- 'Lieutenant Tyndal of the US Army Air Corps – this man is referred to as 'Lieutenant Tyndall' on page 80 of 'Jackals of the Reich', whose author states on page 10 that he has 'given every man a pseudonym'. This may be a reference to Martin James Monti, but Landwehr gives no reference that he was either a British subject or a member of the British Free Corps.
- Harold Cole (158), a British soldier who assisted and later betrayed the French Resistance during World War II, and who was killed while resisting arrest after the war ended. He cites no reference that Cole was a member of the Corps.

== List of members ==
	MI5 no.	BFC Rank	Surname	Forename	Alias	Details	Sentence	MI5 Cat.	Jackals of the Reich	British Rank	Unit/Ship	Landwehr number
1.	N/A (Note: joined about September 1944)	SS-Mann	Alexander	William J.	Clyde	"arrived towards the end of September 1944... a Glaswegian … the victim of compulsion because of his sexual liaisons with a German girl" "Tough, tattooed". He was selected to box for the SS pioneers against the SS police in Prague in late 1944, but lost his bout. Planned to leave with Cowie, January 1945 Sent to the isolation camp at Drönnewitz Home Office file – HO 45/25835	"in the middle of 1946 ... called to an MI5 office and given a severe warning as to [his] future conduct". – Passed to DPS (sic) for consideration, August 1945	IV	P105 – Pte Clyde (a corporal in the Highland Light Infantry)	Private – 3314447	Highland Light Infantry	3. 128. 'Corporal Clyde'
2.	N/A (Note: joined February 1945)	SS-Mann	Axon	Frank	Atkins	In late February 1945 ‘the last volunteer came forward. Frank Axon, from Crewe, had been taken prisoner in Greece in April 1941 ... Since then he had been employed as an agricultural labourer in detachments centred around Stalag XVIII-A at Wolfsberg in Austria, where in February 1945 he was accused of striking a cow, causing it to calve early. Threatened with punishment for this he was offered the alternative of joining the BFC which, unbelievable as it may seem, he accepted.’ Court martial papers – WO 71/1123	2 years’ imprisonment with hard labour at a court-martial	VI	P143 – "Ronald Atkins, a driver in the RAMC", P164 re sentence	Lance-corporal – 182828	Royal Army Service Corps	26.
3.	18 (Note: alias)	SS-Mann	Barker	Ronald	Voysey	‘entirely seduced by the prospect of more food, alcohol, tobacco and, above all, the opportunity to associate with women. Described by Cooper as ‘a man of very inferior intelligence’, he was an Australian, from Goulburn, New South Wales, and was captured on his ship by the German pocket battleship Admiral Scheer in the Indian Ocean in 1941.’ Retrieved Cowie & Co. Shortly after 8/3/45 ‘Finally realizing that the British Free Corps was going to have to fight, Barker lost all of his former enthusiasm for anti-Communism and made himself ill by smoking aspirins; he was sent back to Berlin by a gullible medical officer.’ Took off towards Bremen, 9 April 1945 Home Office file – HO 45/25822	2 years' imprisonment with hard labour at the Old Bailey for offences against the Defence Regulations	(Note: Civilian)	PP 90, 147, 151 – David Voysey	Merchant Navy Seaman	MV British Advocate	154. 126. 'David Voysey'
4.	20	SS-Mann	Batchelor	Harry Dean	Cameron/ Young	From Kent ... captured by the Germans in Crete and recruited from a Stalag in Austria. Planned to leave with Cowie, January 1945 Left BFC outside Schwerin on 2 May 1945. Court martial papers – WO 71/1121	Acquitted because statement improperly taken	VI	P89 – Charles Cameron	Sapper – 1944855	Royal Engineers	124. 'Charles Cameron'
5.	19	SS-Mann	Berry	Kenneth Edward	Jordan	See Kenneth Berry	9 months' imprisonment with hard labour at the Old Bailey for offences against the Defence Regulations		Edward Jordan	Merchant Navy Seaman	SS Cymbeline	28. Berry, 87.-88. 'Edward Jordan', 89. 'Kenneth Edwards'
6.		Not known	Blackman	Harry Charles	Not Known	Weale – Left Pankow December 1943		I		Sergeant – 6010228	Essex Regiment	21.
7.	9	SS-Rottenführer	Brittain	William Charles	Hundrupe	See William Brittain – National Archives – waiter and floorwalker in Bournemouth before War – Court martial papers – WO 71/1142	10 yrs – released after 2 months on med. grounds	V	PP61, 81-2, 154 – Hundrupe	Lance-corporal – 5109799	Royal Warwickshire Regiment serving in No. 4 Commando	24. 121. 'Hundrupe'
8.		Not known	Browning	Alfred	Not known	Weale – Left Pankow December 1943 – NA – stool pigeon Court martial papers – WO 71/1136	Convicted at court-martial	I	P72 – Possibly Pte Alfred Robinson	Private – 5192947	Argyll and Sutherland Highlanders	50., ?116. 'Alfred Robinson'
9.		Not known	Chapman	NA – William James	Not known	Left Pankow December 1943	Judge-Advocate General decided no disciplinary action warranted	I	P72 – possibly Pte William Bryant	Private – 14536737 or 14336737	Not known	51., ?115. 'William Bryant'?, 133. 'Private Bryant'
10.		SS-Mann	Chipchase	Robert	nil /Jones	From ‘XVIIIa Spittal … Robert Chipchase … In fact Chipchase only stayed for a couple of days before going to the isolation camp,’	Dealt with summarily by his commanding officer and discharged	II		Private – W1755 or W/X 1755	2/32nd Battalion of the Australian Army	53.
11.		Not known	Clarke	William (Nobby) – NA – Frederick Wilfred Edward	nil	Weale – Left Pankow December 1943	Judge-Advocate General decided no disciplinary action warranted	I	P58 – Nobby Clark	Gunner – 6846466	Royal Artillery	56.
12.	3	SS-Oberscharführer	Cooper	Thomas Haller	Böttcher	See Thomas Haller Cooper	Death for high treason at the Old Bailey, appeal failed, execution date set for 28 February, commuted to life imprisonment – served 7 years		Peter Butcher	N/A – Civilian	N/A – Civilian	2., 109. 'Peter Butcher'
13.	1	SS-Unterscharführer	Courlander	Roy Nicholas	Regan	See Roy Courlander	15 years – reduced to 9 – served 6	V	PP 43, 59-60, 150-1- Roy Regan	Lance-Corporal – 2771	18th Battalion (New Zealand)	5. 'Roy Regan', 30. Roy Nicholas Courlander
14.		SS-Unterscharführer	Cowie	Hugh Wilson	Kingsley	'After being captured in France in 1940 and imprisoned in Stalag XX-A, had made several escape attempts and joined the BFC to avoid court-martial for having a clandestine radio at his Upper Silesian work party'; in Dresden he took drill parades; he was also instrumental in having six Maoris, recruited by Hans Kauss, returned to their work party on the basis that the BFC was a ‘whites only’ unit.; planned to leave, January 1945; sent to the isolation camp at Drönnewitz; British Security Service file held by the National Archives under reference KV 2/257; Court martial papers – WO 71/1120 In 1953, Cowie was sentenced to three years in prison for demanding money under threats from a Jewish businessman. He would drift in and out of prison for various crimes, and died in prison in 1977.	15 years and dismissed with ignominy from the army at a general court-martial; ‘(later reduced to seven)’	V	P86 – Robert Kingsley	Private – 2876924	Gordon Highlanders	122. 'Robert Kingsely'
15.		SS-Mann	Croft	Frederick	Nixon	'not recruited by the renegades but joined as the result of blackmail by the German military authorities. Frederick Croft ... from Finchley, had escaped a total of five times from his working party, until in July 1944 he was put in solitary confinement for a five-week stretch; he was given the opportunity to join the BFC several times before he caved in'; '[i]n August of that year he demanded to be returned to his camp. He was stripped of his uniform and summarily despatched to an SS punishment camp near Schwerin, where he worked in a road-making gang.'; returned to the BFC in November.; surrendered with Cooper in Schwerin on 2 May Court martial papers – WO 71/1118	6 months at a court-martial	VI	P147 – Nixon – P164 – sentence	Bombardier – 900679	Royal Artillery	
16.	N/A (Note: joined about Christmas 1944)	SS-Mann	Croft	George	nil	Joined about Christmas 1944 – ‘George Croft …who had … been in captivity since 1940, … [he and John Sommerville] held strong views about Communism, but in the working party where their long familiarity with the language had led to their employment as interpreters, they were also under physical threat from unruly gangs which had grown up amongst the other prisoners. After some discussion, the pair decided that their best option was to join the Waffen-SS, preferably in the ‘Totenkopf’ division which they had read about in the English version of Signal magazine. As soon as they made their views known they were hustled to Berlin for an interview with [the BFC's Verbindungsoffizier SS-Obersturmführer Dr Walter] Kühlich, who persuaded them to join the BFC instead; in March 1945 ‘suddenly found himself stricken with gonorrhoea serious enough for him to be sent to a military hospital in Neubrandenburg; he had caught it from a girlfriend in Berlin,’ Court martial papers – WO 71/1124	7 years' penal servitude	VI		Private – 4390016	Green Howards	57.
17.		Not known	Cryderman	Arthur James	Tilbury	Weale ‘from Manitoba’ – Left Pankow December 1943	Judge-Advocate General decided no disciplinary action warranted	I	P43 – "Private Arthur Tilbury"	Private – H/41636	Saskatchewan Light Infantry	59., 117. 'Arthur Tilbury'
18.		Not known	Dowden	Clifford	Not known	Weale – Left Pankow December 1943	Judge-Advocate General decided no disciplinary action warranted	I	P58 – Clifford Haggard	Gunner – 14224674	Royal Artillery	64.
19.	14	SS-Mann	Ellsmore	Not known	Fraser	Weale ‘a Belgian civilian named Theo Menz who had acquired a British military identity as ‘Sergeant Ellsmore’. From ‘XVIIIa Spittal … Sergeant Theo Ellsmore, the Belgian masquerading as a South African.’ Charged with mutiny on 20 June and sent to Stutthof concentration camp near Danzig ... there is some evidence to suggest that Theo Menz, alias Sturmmann Theo Ellsmore, was executed at Stutthof shortly after his arrival.		(Note: Possibly dead by end of war)	PP 78 and 168 – Theo Maertens	N/A – Civilian	N/A – Civilian	55. 119. 'Theo Maertens' 153. 'Private Frazer'
20.	13	SS-Oberscharführer	Freeman	Thomas	Rogers	‘recruited by Courlander from XVIIIa in Austria in February 1944…decided to join the BFC as a means of attempting to reach the Russian lines and had discussed this and eventually received permission from RSM Jim Mantle, camp leader at Arbeitskommando 99… Freeman, a big man in all senses of the word, stayed on for several months; his case is particularly interesting in that he was the only member of the BFC to be unequivocally cleared of any guilt for his involvement after the war. MI5 later noted: ‘Private Freeman was a member of the British Free Corps but has been cleared of suspicion as it is now abundantly clear that he joined with the object of escaping and of sabotaging the movement.’ [PRO: HO45/ 25805]. He succeeded in at least one of these aims.’ 20 April 1944 – ‘promoted Oberscharführer but with responsibility as discipline NCO (‘ Spiess’ in German military parlance) at Hildesheim;' charged with mutiny on 20 June and sent to Stutthof concentration camp near Danzig. … ‘the charge of mutiny included allegations that I was trying to obstruct the efficient working of the Corps, encouraging insubordination, etc.’ Freeman succeeded in escaping from Stutthof in November 1944 and managed to reach Russian lines; he was repatriated in March 1945;	the only member of the BFC to be unequivocally cleared of any guilt for his involvement after the war – Judge-Advocate General decided no disciplinary action warranted	IV	PP 77–9 – Buck Rogers, Canadian	Private – 5831031	No. 7 Commando	66. 118. 'Buck Rogers'
21.	34	SS-Mann	Futcher	Roy Ralph	Phillpotts	threatened with court-martial for associating with German women; In August 1944 he demanded to be returned to his camp. He was stripped of his uniform and summarily despatched to an SS punishment camp near Schwerin, where he worked in a road-making gang. He returned to the BFC in November. Planned to leave with Cowie, January 1945 Sent to the isolation camp at Drönnewitz Home Office file – HO 45/25836	Released with a warning – 'Committed fascist and anti-Semite ... not considered to be a major player in the unit' – Passed to DPS (sic) for consideration, August 1945	IV	Possibly Pte [P154 – Joe] Reeves of the Duke of Cornwall's Light Infantry	Private – 5724178	Duke of Cornwall's Light Infantry	130. 'Private Reeves' 157 'Joe Philpotts'
22.		Not known	Haines	Cyril	Not known	Weale – Left Pankow December 1943 – later asked to go back to BFC, so Seymer categorises him as IV	No further action taken due to insufficient evidence	IV		Private – 4459934	Durham Light Infantry	67.
23.	10.	SS-Mann	Heighes	Robert Reginald	Reid	Weale – Petersfield butcher – Left Pankow December 1943 – returned in 1944 – by September had taken control of the unit's stores and had discovered that he could considerably increase his wealth by selling their contents to other occupants of the barracks and foreign workers in town. In February 1945 successfully deserted from the unit and joined a column of POWs being evacuated west; … never to return to the ranks of the renegades.	Court-martialed – 2 years' imprisonment	IV	PP 43,151,164 – Allan Taylor	Company sergeant major (acting)/ Private – 1437746	Hampshire Regiment	69.
24.	24.	SS-Mann	How	William	Browne	listened to the recruiter but he did not decide to join until the spring of 1944. From Rochester in Kent. In August 1944 he demanded to be returned to his camp. He was stripped of his uniform and summarily despatched to an SS punishment camp near Schwerin, where he worked in a road-making gang. He returned to the BFC in November. In February 1945 successfully deserted from the unit and joined a column of POWs being evacuated west; … never to return to the ranks of the renegades. Court martial papers – WO 71/1113	7 years' penal servitude	IV	P89 – Private Bookie Brown, a former lance-corporal in the Indian Army Military Police	Lance-Corporal – 793819	Queen's Own Royal West Kent Regiment, transferred to Corps of Military Police 1939	70. 123. 'Bookie Brown'
25.	37.	SS-Mann	Jackson (E)	Edward	Collins	Edward Jackson ... was also often absent from his working party … he had acquired a girlfriend in the local area; this came to the attention of the Gestapo in Dresden who arrested him and made him an offer that he felt he couldn’t refuse.- HO 45/25834	Passed to DPS (sic) for consideration, August 1945	IV		Private – 3713897	King's Own Royal Regiment (Lancaster)	45.
26.		Not known	Kipling	Thomas Blake	Meredith	Weale – Left Pankow December 1943	Judge-Advocate General decided no disciplinary action warranted	I	P58 – Rudyard Meredith	Gunner – 1123187	Royal Artillery	96., 114. 'Rudyard Meredith'
27.		SS-Mann	Labuschagne	Pieter Andries Hendrik	Smith	Joined in the winter of 1944–5 ... succumbed to one of Stranders’ German recruiters, Unterscharführer Hans Kauss, whilst working on a road gang. [D]eemed to be so useless by Mardon that he refused to take him. Slipped away in the direction of Dresden, there to be ‘liberated’ by advancing US forces.	Guilty and fined £50	(Note: South African)	PP 112, 145, 151 – Private Adriaan Smith	Private – 24202	Not Known	71.
28.	12.	SS-Mann	Lane	Robert Henry	Street	Weale – Left Pankow December 1943 – returned 1944 – ‘returned to a Stalag.’ in August 1944	Released with a warning – Judge-Advocate General decided no disciplinary action warranted	IV	PP 57, 59 – "Private Sandy Street" "from Brixton"	Private – 6145422	East Surreys	72., 95., 112. 'Sandy Street'
29.		Not known	Leigh	John	Not known	Left Pankow December 1943	Judge-Advocate General decided no disciplinary action warranted	I		Fusilier – 3606704	Lancashire Fusiliers	73.
30.	22.	SS-Mann	Leister	Dennis John	Beckwith	SS-PK Standarte 'Kurt Eggers' – Home Office file - HO 45/25819	3 years’ penal servitude at the Old Bailey for offences against the Defence Regulations		PP 90, 152 – John Beckwith	N/A – Civilian	N/A – Civilian	25. 'John Beckwith'
31.	8.	Not known	Lewis	Frederick	Lander	MI5 says that he was a seaman PoW – Weale ‘Frederick Lewis, the Fascist merchant seaman, also left [in December 1943]; he found the stress of the frequent British bombing raids on Berlin too much to bear and he was allowed to return to Milag on the basis that he would continue to recruit for the legion.’			PP58, 72 – Able Seaman Walter Lander of the Royal Navy	Merchant Navy Seaman	Not known	48., 113. 'Walter Lander'
32.		SS-Mann	MacKinnon	Alexander	nil	BFC's penultimate recruit … was pressured into joining the Corps to avoid punishment for ‘sabotaging’ agricultural produce. [January 1945] In section as at 8/3/1945 Left as Berneville-Claye's driver, borrowed a farmer's jacket, split up with B-C near Schwerin and handed himself over to the advancing Allies Court martial papers – WO 71/1116	2 years	VI	P144 – 'Webster' was 'driven by his batman, Private Thomas Bull'	Lance-corporal – 2927002	Cameron Highlanders	74.
33.		SS-Unterscharführer	Mardon	Douglas	Hodge	Joined around Christmas 1944 – Douglas Cecil Mardon, the third of the trio of South Africans who joined the Corps at Dresden, possessed very rigid views on the threat to the free world of Soviet success on the Eastern Front. As a POW he had seen Russian prisoners and had come to distinctly racist conclusions about them which, when he read BFC recruiting literature, caused him to volunteer with alacrity. On 8 March 1945 ‘received promotion to Unterscharführer and was given command of a section … was undoubtedly sincere in his wish to fight against the advance of Communism’. On 15/3/1945 ‘removed the tell-tale BFC insignia from [his uniform] … substituted an SS runes collar patch’ Was left with HQ between 29 April and 2 May	Fined £375 for high treason – or £75 per Times		PP 112, 145 – Douglas Hodge	Lance-Corporal – 6221	Not known	75.
34.	7.	SS-Rottenführer	Martin	Edwin Barnard	Bartlett	Edwin Barnard Martin	25 years, pardoned in 1954	V	Edwin Bartlett	Private – A/211311	Essex Scottish Regiment of the Canadian Army	101. 'Edward Bartlett'
35.	2.	SS-Unterscharführer	Maton	Francis Paul	MacCarthy	SS-PK Standarte 'Kurt Eggers' – Francis Paul Maton – Nat Archives P 38 says that he was born around 1920 in Ireland – "Francis Maton was ... a former member of the British Union. He was captured on Crete whilst serving as a corporal in 50 (Middle East) Commando, having been severely wounded in the legs. Commando corporal who had already broadcast for Radio National … with his pronounced Fascist sympathies appeared to be good BFC material" British Security Service file held by the National Archives under reference - KV 2/264 – Court martial papers – WO 71/1117	10 years – Richard Paul Francis MATON: captured in Crete in 1941, he joined the British Free Corps and broadcast propaganda in 1943. Court martialled in 1945, he was sentenced to 10 years imprisonment for voluntarily aiding the enemy.	V	PP 101, 150-151, 162 – MacCarthy	Territorial soldier/ Corporal – 1437735	Royal Artillery	44., 105. 'Frank McCarthy'
36.	4.	SS-Unterscharführer	MacLardy	Francis George	Wood	SS-San. Ers. Btl. Lichtenburg. Frank McLardy – Court martial papers – WO 71/1125	Life at a court-martial – reduced to 15 years – served 7	V	PP44, 59, 78-9, 81-2, 151 – Antony Wood.	Sergeant – 7522956	Royal Army Medical Corps	7. 'Anthony Wood'
37.	38.	SS-Mann	Miller	William John	nil	Joined Dec 44/Jan 45 – captured at Tobruk in 1943, who was persuaded to join the BFC in preference to serving a four-month sentence at the military prison in Graudenz. Planned to leave with Cowie, January 1945 Deemed to be so useless by Mardon that he refused to take him. Taken to Dronnewitz and arrested in Schwerin	Released with a warning – Judge-Advocate General decided no disciplinary action warranted	IV	PP 112–3, 146-7 – Ian Hardcastle	Gunner/ Driver – 847322	Royal Artillery	77.
38.	5.	SS-Sturmmann	Minchin	Alfred Vivian	Milton	Alfred Minchin	7 years’ penal servitude at the Old Bailey for offences against the Defence Regulations		PP 43, 147, 151-2 – "a merchant seaman called Spencer Milton"	Merchant Navy Seaman	SS Empire Ranger	102. 'Sgt Miltion'
39.		SS-Mann	Munns	Charles	nil	a Scotsman ... had acquired a girlfriend in the area of his POW camp near Danzig … his girlfriend, Gertrud Schroeder, was pregnant, an offence technically punishable by death. Allowed to leave the BFC … in order to return to his fiancée in Danzig, January 1945	Judge-Advocate General decided no disciplinary action warranted; ‘seems to have escaped punishment entirely, presumably by convincing MI5 that joining the BFC was entirely the result of duress’	III		Private – 4452237	Durham Light Infantry	78.
40.		SS-Mann	Nicholls	Ernest	nil	In section as at 2/5/1945 – left with a group of ex-prisoners Court martial papers – WO 71/1122	5 years' penal servitude	VI		Private – T/92375	Royal Army Service Corps -	165.
41.	30.	SS-Mann	Nightingale	Harry	nil	Arrived towards the end of September 1944 … from Burnley, was the victim of compulsion because of his sexual liaison with a German girl – In February 1945 ‘made [successful] representations, along with Rose and Symonds, to go to the isolation camp at Drönnewitz.’	Convicted at court-martial	IV	P154 – Reginald Thrush	Gunner – 874257	Royal Artillery	79. 132. 'Private Thrush'
42.		SS-Mann	Perkins	Thomas – NA – William Cecil	Walters	during a party held in their accommodation, Perkins stole a pistol … and sold it to a foreign worker. Perkins claimed to have been a prison officer before the war, but according to Cooper ‘his general character and behaviour led me to believe that his knowledge of prisons was very probably from the inside rather than the outside of a cell’ whilst Maton later remarked that Perkins ‘would steal anything’. Perkins was arrested and, after he had spent a couple of days in close confinement, sent away to the isolation camp.	Judge-Advocate General decided no disciplinary action warranted	IV	PP 105, 154 – Walters	Corporal – 6915004	Royal Northumberland Fusiliers	80.
43.	21.	SS-Mann	Pleasants	Eric Reginald	Dorran	Eric Pleasants	Never tried, but spent 8 years in a Soviet gulag		P90 – Eric Durin	N/A – Civilian	N/A – Civilian	8. 'E. Durin'
44.	23.	SS-Sturmmann	Rose	Norman	Owens	Weale – – Left Pankow December 1943 – returned 1944 – ‘a long-serving regular army lance-corporal – ‘given the job of storeman and also placed in charge of the distribution of the Red Cross parcels’ – In August of that year he demanded to be returned to his camp. He was stripped of his uniform and summarily despatched to an SS punishment camp near Schwerin, where he worked in a road-making gang. – He returned to the BFC in November. In February 1945 ‘made [successful] representations, along with Symonds and Nightingale, to go to the isolation camp at Drönnewitz.’ Court martial papers – WO 71/1130	Life at a court-martial	IV	P105 – Pte Owens	Lance-corporal – 5669883	East Surreys/ Somerset Light Infantry /Buffs (Royal East Kent Regiment)	81. 97. 'Sgt Major Own'
45.	25.	SS-Mann	Rowlands	Herbert	Miller	‘member of the Merchant Navy. Rowlands was a Londoner who, bizarrely enough, had fought in, and deserted from, the International Brigade during the Spanish Civil War; by all accounts he exhibited great resentment towards any kind of authority and by joining the BFC seems to have been making a gesture of defiance at the prisoner leadership in Milag.’ – In August 1944 he demanded to be returned to his camp. He was stripped of his uniform and summarily despatched to an SS punishment camp near Schwerin, where he worked in a road-making gang. – By November he had escaped and was hiding out with Herbert Smallwood, an elderly English ex-soldier, in the Berlin suburb of Spandau – British Security Service file held by the National Archives under reference KV 2/625 – Home Office file – HO 45/25801 "Seamen Committed For Trial." Times, London, England, 3 Jan. 1946: 2. The Times Digital Archive. Web. 18 Feb. 2015.	2 years imprisonment with hard labour at the Old Bailey for offences against the Defence Regulations		PP 90, 152-3 – Roland Miller	Merchant Navy Seaman	Not known	41. 127. 'Roland Miller'
46.	32.	SS-Untersturmführer	Shearer	William	nil	William Shearer			P85 – "a captain from a Scottish regiment"	Lieutenant	4th Seaforth Highlanders	152.
47.	N/A	SS-Mann	Somerville	John	nil	Joined about Christmas 1944 – George Croft and John Sommerville, who had both been in captivity since 1940, also held strong views about Communism, but in the working party where their long familiarity with the language had led to their employment as interpreters, they were also under physical threat from unruly gangs which had grown up amongst the other prisoners. After some discussion, the pair decided that their best option was to join the Waffen-SS, preferably in the ‘Totenkopf’ division which they had read about in the English version of Signal magazine. As soon as they made their views known they were hustled to Berlin for an interview with Kühlich, who persuaded them to join the BFC instead. In section as at 2/5/1945 – left with a group of ex-prisoners.	'Not yet located' in August 1946			Gunner – 1449698	Royal Artillery	58.
48.	17	SS-Mann	Stokes	Albert	Gordon	Agreed along with Wood and Freeman to join – from ‘XVIIIa Spittal … Albert Stokes’ – Albert Stokes, the quiet Australian, had actually joined at the same time as his friend Tom Freeman with the specific intention of sabotaging the unit. Batchelor later suggested, ‘They didn’t want the Jerries to think they were frightened so they just went,’ – Left BFC outside Schwerin on 2 May	1 year's imprisonment	VI		Corporal – WX 1839	2/32nd Battalion of the Australian Army	54.
49.	11.	SS-Sturmmann	Symonds	Henry	Davies	Henry Alfred Symonds – MI5 says that alias Davis was a battalion signaler – Planned to leave with Cowie, January 1945, but did not show up – In February 1945 ‘made [successful] representations, along with Rose and Nightingale, to go to the isolation camp at Drönnewitz.’ - Court martial papers – WO 71/1126	15 years at a court-martial	V	PP43, 59 – "Private Harry Davies"	Signaller/ Private – 6153448	East Surrey Regiment, then Princess Louise's Kensington Regiment	42., 107. 'Harry Davies', 110.
50.		Not known	Van Heerden	L.P.	nil	Weale – Left Pankow December 1943 – "Killed in action on 12 February 1945, during bombing of Dresden"			Possibly P 112 – Jan Pieterson	Rifleman – RH6857914	Long Range Desert Group	68.
51.		SS-Mann	Viljoen	Lourens	nil	Joined Dec 44/Jan 45 – a South African, who joined through the good offices of a friendly SS NCO in charge of his working party. – hospitalized with burns during the Dresden raids	Acquitted		possibly P 116 – Corporal Ludewicus Rendsberg	Corporal – 195528	Not known	91.
52.		Not known	Wilson	John	nil	Weale – Left Pankow December 1943 – alleged to have sought to return to BFC	Judge-Advocate General decided no disciplinary action warranted	IV		Private – 14406287	Durham Light Infantry	93.
53.	6.	SS-Oberscharführer	Wilson	John Eric	Montgomery	"News in Brief." Times, London, England, 22 Jan. 1946: 2. The Times Digital Archive. Web. 20 Mar. 2015. Court martial papers -WO 71/1119	10 years at a court martial	V	Company Sergeant Major ‘Tug’ Montgomery – PP 43, 61, 100	Trooper – 7684352	No. 3 Commando	43., 94. 'Eric Wilson'
54.	15/ 16	SS-Mann	Wood	Lionel	Williams	‘recruited by Courlander from Stalag XVIIIa in Austria in February 1944…decided to join the BFC as a means of attempting to reach the Russian lines and had discussed this and eventually received permission from RSM Jim Mantle, camp leader at Arbeitskommando 99… only stayed with the BFC for three weeks before demanding to be returned to camp’	Dealt with summarily by his commanding officer and discharged	II	Possibly P89 – Corporal Lionel Frost	Lance-Corporal – V/X 13097 or W/X 13097	2/32nd Battalion of the Australian Army	65. 125. 'Lionel Frost'

== Other current or former British subjects who served in the German Armed Forces in the Second World War ==
This category includes citizens of neutral Eire who were captured while serving in the British Army – see British nationality law and the Republic of Ireland#British subjects with local Irish nationality. It does not include members of the BFC who also served in other units of the German armed forces, such as Thomas Haller Cooper (Waffen-SS), Roy Courlander, Dennis John Leister and Francis Paul Maton (all SS-Standarte Kurt Eggers) and Frank McLardy (SS Medical Corps Lichtenberg).

No.	German Rank	Surname	Forename	Alias	Details	Sentence	Jackals of the Reich	British Rank	British Unit/Ship	German unit	Landwehr number
1.	SS-Hauptsturmführer	Berneville-Claye	Douglas		Douglas Berneville-Claye	Not prosecuted	Chapter 15 – Archibald Webster	Second Lieutenant – 20172	L detachment of the Special Air Service	SS Hauptamt	27.
2.	Sonderführer	Becker*	Frank Chetwynd		'WAR: Renegades and Persons suspected or convicted of assisting the Enemy: BECKER, Frank Chetwin; served in the German army and in the Indian Legion (Free Indian Corps)'			N/A – Civilian	N/A	Indian Legion	164.
3.	SS-Unterscharführer	Brady	James	Charlos de Lacy	James Brady (SS)	Fifteen years in prison, of which the General Officer Commanding London District remitted three years – released in 1950		Fusilier	Royal Irish Fusiliers	SS-Jagdverband Mitte	22.
4.	SS-Hilfswilliger	Celliers*	William		South African policeman from Windhoek, South-West Africa	Not prosecuted		Corporal		1st SS Panzer Division Leibstandarte SS Adolf Hitler	104.
5.		Codd*	John	Juan Louis	John Codd	Not prosecuted		Corporal	Royal Welch Fusiliers	German Intelligence service (Abwehr) and SS Intelligence/ Sicherheitsdienst	
6.	SS-Hilfswilliger	Conen*	James		London taxi-driver	Not prosecuted		Corporal		1st SS Panzer Division Leibstandarte SS Adolf Hitler	103.
7.	SS-Untersturmführer	Freeman	Railton	Royston/Metcalfe	Court Martial papers AIR 18/28; The National Archives Security Service file KV 2/631	Ten years in prison		Flying officer – 77107	No. 16 Squadron RAF	SS-Standarte Kurt Eggers	6. 'Raymond Metcalfe'
8.		Purdy*	Roy Walter	Pointer/Ronald Wallace	Walter Purdy	Death sentence commuted to life imprisonment – released after nine years		Sub-lieutenant	HMS Van Dyck	SS-Standarte Kurt Eggers	46.
9.	SS-Sturmbannführer	Stranders	Vivian			Not prosecuted – had been naturalized as a German citizen in 1933	PP 92–6 – appears under his real name	Captain in the RAF		SS-Hauptamt Amtsgruppe D	83.
10.	SS-Mann	Stringer	Frank	Willy Le Page	Frank Stringer Court martial papers – WO 71/1132	15 years		Fusilier – 7043206	Royal Irish Fusiliers	SS-Jagdverband Mitte	23.

(*) Not in Weale's list.
