= Henry Alfred Symonds =

British collaborator with Nazi Germany

Henry Alfred Symonds (24 March 1924 – c. June 1994) was a British soldier who served in the British Free Corps of the Waffen-SS during World War II, attaining the rank of Rottenführer

Symonds was born in Willesden, Middlesex in March 1924. He originally joined the East Surrey Regiment at the age of 17, and then volunteered to become a paratrooper but had lost his nerve after his third jump and been transferred into Princess Louise's Kensington Regiment. He was captured in Italy on 4 October 1943. He "decided, after some initial hesitation, to stay on" in the BFC in December 1943. In February 1945 he made successful representations to go to the isolation camp at Drönnewitz. He gave evidence for the defence in the trial of Edwin Barnard Martin. He was sentenced to 15 years in prison after the war. He died in Vale Royal, Cheshire in 1994 at the age of 70.

== See also ==
- British Free Corps
- List of members of the British Free Corps
