= Courlander =

Courlander may refer to:

== Demonym ==
- Someone from Courland
- Something related to the historic Duchy of Courland and Semigallia

== People ==
- Harold Courlander (1908—1996), an American anthropologist
- Roy Courlander (1914–1979), a New Zealand soldier who served in the British Free Corps, a unit of the German Waffen-SS
