= Kenneth Berry (British Free Corps) =

British Nazi collaborator

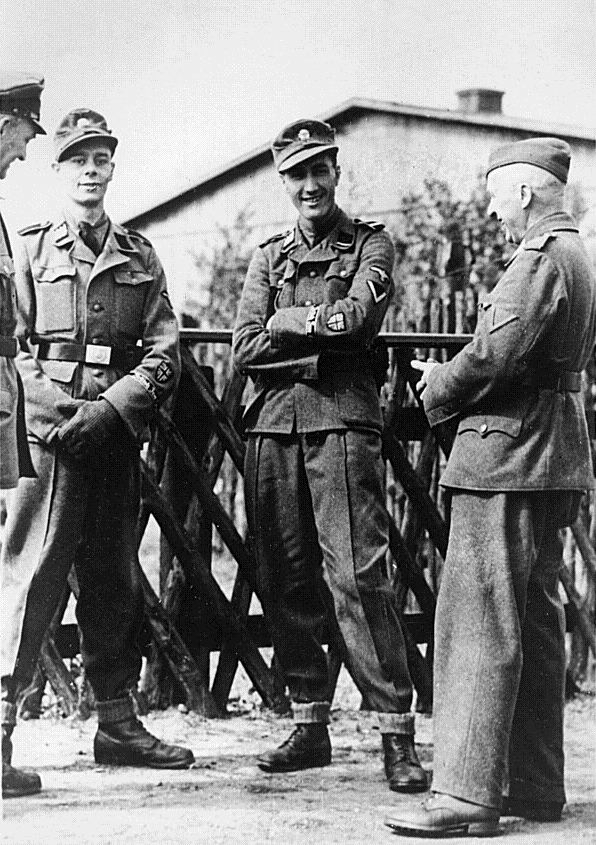
- SS-Mann Berry (second left) with SS-Sturmmann Alfred Minchin (second right) and German war correspondents, April 1944
- Born: 17 November 1925; Devonport, Devon, England
- Died: 22 November 1992 (aged 67); Falmouth, Cornwall, England
- Military career
- Allegiance: United Kingdom; Nazi Germany
- Branch: British Merchant Navy (Schutzstaffel) Waffen-SS
- Service years: 1939–40; 1943–45
- Rank: Boy Seaman
- Conflicts: World War II

Kenneth Edward Jordan Berry (17 November 1925 – 22 November 1992) was a British seaman and collaborator who was taken as a prisoner of war in 1940 when his ship was sunk. While in prison camp he was persuaded to join the British Free Corps of the Waffen-SS as an SS-Mann during the Second World War. He was associated with the unit until 29 April 1945, when he could not be found when the Corps were leaving Neustrelitz, and was left behind. He received a nine-month sentence after the war, 'the lightest sentence passed on any traitor'.

== Early life ==
Kenneth Berry was born in November 1925 at Devonport in Devon the son of Samuel Jordan Berry, an Admiralty police constable and Beatrice Amy (née Collins). He went to school in Penryn and Falmouth but ran away from home aged 13 after a conviction for stealing from a vehicle and one for stealing a golf ball. He worked for some months as a kitchen boy at the Pontargen Hotel in Falmouth.

== Service at sea and capture ==
At the age of 14, Berry claimed to be fifteen years old in order to join the Merchant Navy and after an initial engagement at sea he sailed aboard the oil tanker Cymbeline on 27 May 1940 as a Boy Seaman. Sailing on behalf of the British Admiralty from Gibraltar to Trinidad, Cymbeline was attacked on 2 September 1940 by the German commerce raider Widder, a merchant vessel converted into a heavily armed auxiliary cruiser. The tanker was sunk with loss of seven of the crew, although 26 survivors, including Berry, were rescued and taken prisoner of war being held aboard for 6 weeks before going into captivity in occupied France.

Berry was held prisoner of war at Besançon and later Ilag St. Denis in France, during which time he reportedly escaped from captivity and became a black marketer in Paris until he was recaptured. Questioned by the Gestapo he betrayed people who had helped him escape and as a result was not spoken to by any other prisoner on his return to prison camp.

== British Free Corps ==
In 1943 British fascist John Amery who was touring camps in Germany and occupied France and Poland where British prisoners were held persuaded Berry to join his British Free Corps with the stated objective of fighting beside the German Army against communist forces on the eastern front. Berry and three other recruits were moved to accommodation in Paris (Avenue Exelmanns) before an expected move to Berlin. Berry had little education and had been convinced that Amery was the British Foreign Secretary Leo Amery who was actually John Amery's father. Berry was arrested in Paris by the Gestapo and held for eight weeks until he was sent to Berlin in August 1943 and lodged in a boarding house. Unable to speak German he spent most of his time at the zoo although he claimed to have been frequently arrested for signalling to the bombers which were targeting Berlin by night. He was severely beaten on one occasion.

Berry was enlisted into the British Free Corps in November 1943, by which time it had moved from control of the German Army to the Waffen-SS. He was transported to Genshagen where he joined the other recruits Roy Courlander, Lewis, William Brittain, Frank McLardy, Martin and Alfred Minchin. In February 1944 the unit moved to Hildesheim at the base of the SS Nordic Study Centre, it numbered eight men and from here the New Zealander Roy Courlander began visiting prison camps to try to recruit more members.

From late April 1944 he wore SS uniform with rank and national insignia and a British flag emblem on his sleeve. In June 1944 Berry was sent with Alfred Minchin to recruit new members from prison camps. Having been recognized as their naive former Boy Seaman by ex-members of the crew of the Cymbeline who were on a prison working party in Westertimke, Berry was advised that contrary to what he had been told Germany was losing the war and that he should return to the prison camp. He spoke to the senior officer of the British prison camp Captain Robert Finlay-Notman and other officers asking for advice on how to get out of the British Free Corps and placed in writing a plea for help. He was advised to visit the Swiss Embassy in Berlin, which one source states he did in July 1944, although another states that he did not do this; Berry received no real help despite Captain Finlay-Notman's written request to the Swiss.

Still undergoing training, he moved to Dresden with the British Free Corps on 11 October 1944 where combat-engineer training commenced after they were issued with weapons and expected to carry out military duties for the first time. The performance of the thirteen British, Australian, New Zealand, South African and Canadian recruits was poor. Following the heavy bombing of Dresden by Allied Air Forces in 1945 they were all arrested, prior to being moved to Berlin ready to move to the Eastern Front and into action.

On 22 March 1945 he was assigned with a handful of the recruits to join the 3rd Company of 11th SS Armoured Reconnaissance Unit which consisted of Germans, Dutch, Danish, Norwegians, Flemings, Swedes, Swiss and various foreign volunteers. Before being put into the frontline on the River Oder the men of the British Free Corps were removed. During evacuation of the units in late April-early May 1945 Berry could not be found and the remaining members left him behind.

Berry was captured out of uniform by the Red Army who believed that he was a British prisoner of war and handed him to nearby US Army units. The Americans flew him back to England on 12 May 1945 when he returned home to Penryn, Cornwall.

== Evidence ==
From September 1944 when Roy Courlander was captured in Belgium by Allied forces and subsequently interrogated, Berry had been identified as a member of the British Free Corps. Seamen prisoners repatriated on medical grounds from prison camps had reported his name and he was added to a list of men to be arrested.

On 3 July 1945 and 3 November 1945 Berry was formally interviewed and gave full statements concerning his life, his capture and his time with the British Free Corps. These are preserved at the National Archives, London.

On 3 September 1945 reporting of the Farnborough, Hampshire court-martial of Canadian soldier Edward Bernard Martin (26) of the Canadian Essex Scottish Regiment who had served in the British Free Corps stated that during his trial he had named about 40 other men who had served with the unit, amongst those named was Seaman Kenneth Berry.

== Trial ==
Berry was one of the members of the British Free Corps identified post-war and, as such having been remanded in custody on 20 December 1945, he faced trial commencing 2 January 1946. Newspapers reported that he was aged 20, from Glasny Road, Penryn, Cornwall. He was charged specifically that "with others not presently in custody and with others unknown, to do acts with intent to assist the enemy, namely to join the British Free Corps", Appearing at Bow Street Magistrates' Court, he was charged under the Defence Regulations Act. Captain Notman appeared as a witness in his defence, and Berry received a nine-month hard labour prison sentence. The formal assessment of him during the interrogation of Wilhelm Roessler, one of the German military advisers with the British Free Corps, can only have helped Berry at trial, when he was regarded as "a young fool who did not know what he was doing", an opinion echoed by Director of Public Prosecutions, who placed on record that he considered Berry to be "an irresponsible youth who was easily led".

== Post-war ==
Berry returned to the sea as a merchant seaman in 1946.

On 10 May 1947 he married his German girlfriend Carola Schwarz; they had seven children.

During 1947 he was one of several former members of the British Free Corps who sailed to South Africa after subpoena to testify at the trial of three South Africans who had been members of the unit.

== Death ==
Berry died in November 1992 at Oakfield Road in Falmouth, Cornwall; his wife died in April 2004 at Truro, Cornwall.

== Official records ==
The National Archives holds the depositions for his trial at the Central Criminal Court under reference CRIM 1/485, a Home Office file on him under reference HO 45/25820 and a Security Service file on him under reference KV 2/255.

== See also ==
- List of members of the British Free Corps

== Bibliography ==
- West, Rebecca (1949). "Chapter III: Children – Kenneth Edward and Stoker Rose". The Meaning of Treason. London: Macmillan & Co Ltd.
- Ronald Seth. Jackals of the Reich. The Story of the British Free Corps. PP 30–32, P 44, Chapter 4 (PP 49–54), P58. (New English Library, 1972). This book was effectively a re-writing by the British spy writer Ronald Seth of The Yeomen of Valhalla (Behind the Siegfried Line). Seth also chose to use the same pseudonyms. Neither of these books included references or a bibliography and, as a result, some subsequent writers have taken the pseudonyms to be real names.
- Sean Murphy. Letting the Side Down: British Traitors of the Second World War, PP119–20. London: The History Press Ltd, 2005. ISBN 0-7509-4176-6
- John M Young (1994). Britain's Sea War. Patrick Stephens. ISBN 185260042X.
- Adrian Weale (1994). Renegades. Weidenfeld & Nicolson. ISBN 0297814885.
- Gabe Thomas (1995). MILAG. Milag Prisoner of War Association. ISBN 0952549808.
