= William Shearer (British Free Corps) =

British Nazi collaborator

William Alan Watson Shearer (13 August 1917 – 9 July 1995) was a member of the British Free Corps in the Waffen-SS during the Second World War.

Shearer was born in Northamptonshire in August 1917. A lieutenant in the 4th Seaforth Highlanders, he was the only British officer to join the British Free Corps (with the exception of the brief involvement of Lieutenant Douglas Berneville-Claye). This was the result of his having suffered a serious nervous breakdown in March 1943. He had become suicidal in the wake of this. He rarely left his room and would not put on his BFC uniform. After a few weeks he was returned to the Ansbach mental asylum and eventually repatriated to Britain by the Red Cross in January 1945.

Shearer died in Northamptonshire in July 1995 at the age of 77.

== See also ==
- British Free Corps
- List of members of the British Free Corps
