= Ken Berry (disambiguation) =

Ken Berry (1933–2018) was an American actor, dancer, and singer.

Ken Berry or Kenneth Berry may also refer to:

- Kenneth Berry (British Free Corps) (1925–1992), member of the British Free Corps during World War II
- Ken Berry (baseball) (born 1941), American baseball player
- Ken Berry (ice hockey) (born 1960), Canadian ice hockey player
- Kenneth F. Berry (1916–2003), former member of the Ohio General Assembly
