= William Shearer =

William Shearer may refer to:

- William Shearer (British Free Corps) (1917–1995), member of the Waffen-SS British Free Corps
- Bill Shearer (William K. Shearer, 1931–2007), co-founded the American Independent Party
- William Shearer (immunologist) (1937–2018), American immunologist
- William A. C. Shearer, British educator
