= Leonard Parrington =

British Army officer (1890–1979)

- Born: 24 February 1890; Malling, Kent, England
- Died: 1979 (aged 88–89)
- Branch: British Army
- Service years: 1911–1946
- Rank: Brigadier
- Conflicts: First World War; Second World War
- Awards: Military Cross

Brigadier Leonard Parrington MC (24 February 1890 – 1979) was a British Army officer. He joined the Royal Garrison Artillery in 1911 and served with them in the First World War in which he was mentioned in despatches four times and was awarded the Military Cross. In the inter-war period he was seconded as an adjutant to the Territorial Army in the East of England, as an instructor at the Indian Artillery School and as part of the British military mission to the Egyptian Army. Upon the outbreak of the Second World War Parrington was promoted to colonel; he became an acting brigadier in 1941 and was posted to Greece. Allied forces were pushed back during the German invasion and Parrington, in charge of the evacuation of remaining troops, was forced to surrender on 29 April 1941. In captivity he inspected German holiday camps set up for prisoners of war. He was mistakenly thought to be pro-Nazi and was recommended, without his knowledge, for command of the British Free Corps, a collaborationist unit of the German SS. Parrington retired from the army in 1946.

== Early life and First World War ==
Parrington was born on 24 February 1890. On 4 January 1911 he joined the British Army as a probationary second lieutenant in the Royal Garrison Artillery (RGA). His commission was confirmed and he was granted the substantive rank of second lieutenant on 3 September 1912.

Parrington served with the RGA in the First World War and was appointed to the acting rank of captain on 20 October 1914. He took part in the May 1915 Battle of Aubers and was promoted to the permanent rank of lieutenant on 9 June 1915. Parrington served as aide-de-camp to General Herbert Plumer, commander of the Second Army between February and April 1916.

Parrington took part in the Battle of the Somme and on 26 September 1916 was awarded the Military Cross for conspicuous gallantry. Parrington was serving as a forward observer officer in an exposed lookout point when he came under heavy enemy artillery fire. He remained at his post and continued to relay targeting information back to his battery.

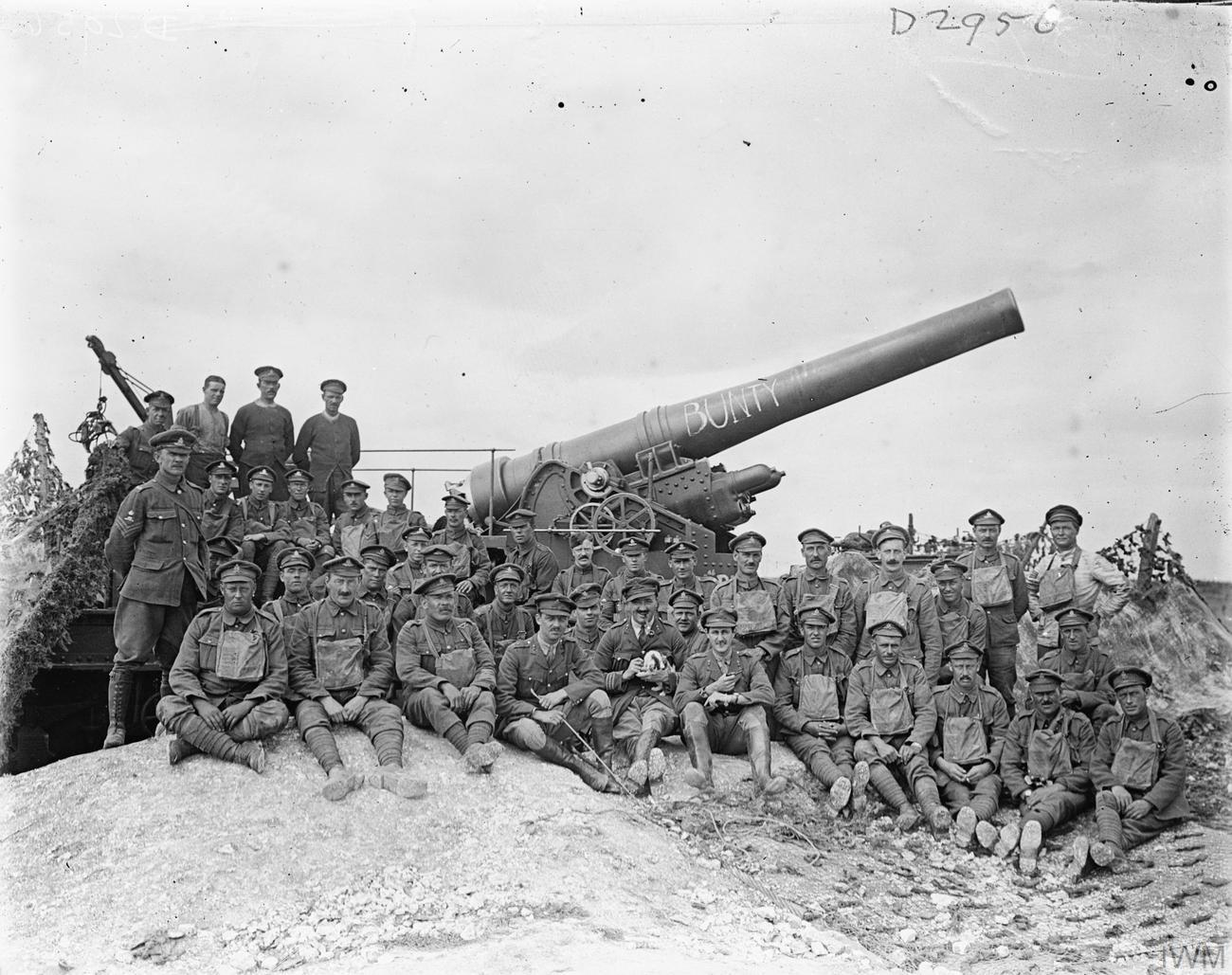
A British siege artillery piece and crew during the German spring offensive of 1918

In October 1916 Parrington was appointed to command a howitzer battery. He was appointed to the acting rank of major on 9 January 1917, when he assumed command of a siege artillery battery. Parrington took part in the 1917 Battles of Arras and Passchendaele. He was confirmed in the substantive rank of captain on 3 November 1917. Parrington fought against the German spring offensive of 1918. He was mentioned in despatches four times during the war.

== Inter-war period ==
Parrington relinquished the acting rank of major on 13 October 1919 and went on to serve in the post-war occupation of Germany. He was appointed to the temporary rank of staff captain on 20 September 1920 and relinquished this on 1 April 1921. Parrington was seconded for service with the Territorial Army reserve force on 18 April 1923, serving as adjutant of the 58 (Essex and Suffolk) Medium Brigade RGA. He attended the Gunnery Staff Course from 31 August 1926. Parrington left that role on 31 August 1926 and returned to the regular army on 26 September 1927, joining the Royal Artillery as the RGA had since been merged with the Field Artillery.

Parrington was seconded to the Indian Artillery School on 29 December 1927. He left that post on 29 December 1931 and returned to the British Army on 24 February 1932. Parrington was promoted to major on 9 July 1933. He was appointed an assistant instructor at the Royal School of Artillery on 19 June 1937 and was immediately seconded to the British military mission to the Egyptian Army. Parrington was granted the local rank of lieutenant-colonel on 1 December 1938, to be held whilst serving with the mission.

== Second World War and later ==
Shortly after the start of the Second World War Parrington was promoted, on 2 October 1939, to the substantive rank of colonel. He was promoted to the acting rank of brigadier in March 1941. As part of Operation Lustre Parrington was deployed with British Empire forces to Greece, to oppose the anticipated German invasion and commanded a base at Larissa. By late April 1941 Allied forces had been pushed back to Kalamata, from which they were being evacuated by sea. Parrington was senior Allied officer on the beachhead and in command of the evacuation.

New Zealand Sergeant Jack Hinton reported to Parrington's headquarters on 28 April, as the Germans were entering the port, cutting off the evacuation route. Parrington told Hinton to surrender, to which he replied "Surrender? Go and jump in the bloody lake!". Parrington warned Hinton he could have him court martialled for speaking to a senior officer like that upon which Hinton said "if you're not careful I'll have you court-martialled for talking surrender" before leaving. Hinton went on to storm a German machine gun post and an artillery position, before being wounded and captured; he was awarded the Victoria Cross for his bravery. Parrington surrendered the following day, one of 8,000 men captured by the Germans at Kalamata.

In captivity Parrington was ordered by Major-General Victor Fortune to visit a number of "holiday camps" set up by the Germans for prisoners of war, to ascertain what the purpose of the camps was. This included a site at Genshagen, Brandenburg, which was being used by the Schutzstaffel (SS), to seek recruits for their British Free Corps.

Parrington visited Genshagen in August 1943. He did not discover the recruitment operation and gave the prisoners permission go on escorted parole to visit Berlin. A speech Parrington made to the prisoners stated that "he knew the purpose of the camp" and that the inmates were not to worry about it, was wrongly interpreted by Free Corps members as an indication that he approved of the unit. Parrington, who did not enjoy his visits to the camps, also told the prisoners they had a duty to escape, where possible.

Parrington's visit led to him being proposed, unknowingly and unwillingly, to SS leader Heinrich Himmler by SS general Gottlob Berger as a possible commander for the Free Corps. Berger claimed Parrington had "the reputation of being both enthusiastically and sincerely devoted to the Fuhrer". Parrington was likely known to New Zealand Free Corps member Roy Courlander, who had also been captured at Kalamata.

Parrington's acting rank ceased shortly after the end of the war in Europe in May 1945. He retired from the army on 15 March 1946 and was granted the honorary rank of brigadier. Parrington left the Reserve of Officers on 24 February 1948, upon reaching the age limit of 58 years. In 1963 Parrington won a libel case against history writers Anthony Heckstall-Smith and Vice-Admiral Harold Baillie-Grohman and publisher Anthony Blond who he said had cast doubts on his courage and ability at Kalamata in their book Greek Tragedy '41. Parrington died in 1979. His seven-volume diary covering the period 1915 to 1941 is in the collection of the Imperial War Museums.
