= Thomas Haller Cooper =

British Nazi collaborator

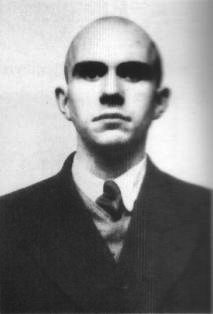
- Cooper in British custody (1945)
- Born: 29 August 1919; Chiswick, London, England
- Died: 1987 or late 1990s England, United Kingdom
- Other name: Tom Böttcher
- Occupations: Activist, member of British Free Corps
- Status: Deceased
- Conviction: High treason
- Penalty: Death; commuted to life imprisonment

Thomas Haller Cooper (29 August 1919 – 1987 or late 1990s), also known as Tom Böttcher, was a British Nazi collaborator. He was a member of the German Waffen-SS British Free Corps and former member of the British Union of Fascists.

== Biography ==
=== Early life ===
Thomas Cooper was born on 29 August 1919 in Chiswick to a British father, Ashley Cooper, and a German mother, Anna Maria (née Simon). His father was a photographer and commercial artist who had met Thomas's mother in Berlin. Cooper attended Latymer Upper School, Hammersmith, and upon leaving in 1936 attempted to find work. He was rejected by the Metropolitan Police, the Royal Navy and the Royal Air Force, and on each occasion the reason given was that he had a German mother. Extremely resentful of his treatment, Cooper joined the British Union of Fascists in September 1938.

A fluent German-speaker, Cooper contacted the German Academic Exchange Organisation in Russell Square, London. After a short period, he was offered a place at the Reich Labour Service (RAD) office in Stuttgart during the summer of 1939. Finding himself in Germany during the outbreak of the Second World War on 3 September 1939, Cooper was arrested as an enemy alien. However, he was released after producing a certificate that his mother had obtained classifying him as an ethnic German or Volksdeutscher.

=== Military life ===
Cooper was offered an opportunity to join the SS, which he eventually accepted. He was ordered to return on 1 February 1940 at the Berlin Lichterfelde Barracks, the home of the 1st SS Panzer Division Leibstandarte SS Adolf Hitler. While at this camp, Cooper told his superiors that his father was now serving with British armed forces, and that he thought it was no longer appropriate to be serving with the SS. After being placed under arrest, Cooper reconsidered his position and announced that he would remain with the SS.

In July 1940, Cooper was transferred to the 8th Company, 5th Totenkopf Infantry Regiment based at Oranienburg to the north of Berlin, tasked with training recruits in the use of machine guns. He remained with this regiment until February 1941. At this time, Cooper had been moved to Płock, near the River Vistula, in German-occupied Poland. Promoted to SS-Rottenführer, he left the regiment to go to the SS NCO School at Lauenburg, Pomerania, for training which finished in May 1941.

Cooper was then moved to a subunit based at the Dębica training area near Kraków. His detachment centred on the security and administration of the training area. Cooper was also promoted to SS-Unterscharführer in November 1941. It has been stated that "the circumstantial case is compelling" that Cooper was involved in the Holocaust. According to fellow BFC members, Cooper had bragged about committing atrocities in Poland. Roy Futcher said Cooper claimed that "he had been in the parties that had rounded up Jews in Poland and thrown women out of top storey buildings." Another BFC member, Francis Maton, discussed a "purge" supposedly conducted by Cooper in the Warsaw Ghetto.

"One story which always stands out in my mind, told by Cooper, is one he told me about Warsaw. He said he was at that time in charge of a squad of Ukrainian volunteers and they were conducting a purge through the ghetto. His attention was drawn to a house by reason of loud screams issuing from the back of it. On going inside the house he found in the top flat a bunch of these Ukrainians holding at bay with pistols some twenty Jews. On asking them what the noise was about they told him in broken German that they had found a new way of killing Jews. This was done simply by opening the window wide and two men each grabbing an arm and a leg and flinging the Jew through the open window. The small children and babies followed their parents because they said they would only grow into big Jews."

Thomas Freeman, a commando who had joined the BFC in order to disrupt it, said Cooper claimed that "He had himself shot over 200 Poles and 80 Jews in one day – by merely lining them up against a wall and shooting them down. This was in Warsaw." While Cooper was in the city of Dębica, one of duties of his unit was supervising Jewish and Polish slave laborers in SS-Truppenübungsplatz Heidelager, a concentration camp which was attached to an SS training area. Although these statements were numerous enough that MI5 mentioned them in their report about his case, the claims were not investigated further.

Cooper was badly wounded in both legs fighting the Red Army during February 1943. He was carried back by his men to Schablinov. From there he was evacuated via Narva, Riga and Königsberg to Bad Muskau, a small town located near Görlitz. Cooper was awarded the Wound Badge in Silver, becoming the only Englishman to receive a German combat decoration during the Second World War. He was transferred to the British Free Corps and was soon promoted to Oberscharführer, assigned to a transit camp for new recruits at a villa in the Grunewald, Berlin. In November 1944 he was dismissed from the British Free Corps, arrested for "various heinous anti-Nazi crimes", and taken to the depot of the Panzergrenadier training battalion of the Leibstandarte Adolf Hitler, where he spent the next six months working for the Feldjägerkorps.

=== Prosecution ===
After the war, Cooper was tried for high treason at the Central Criminal Court in January 1946 and sentenced to hang. At his trial, according to the judge, Cooper admitted that he had "trained people to kill our sons and those of our Allies and our soldiers." An appeal failed, but days before his scheduled execution, the sentence was commuted to life imprisonment "on the grounds that [he] had been [a follower] in treason rather than [a leader]." The trial is covered in Rebecca West's The Meaning of Treason. The depositions from Cooper's trial are held at the National Archives under reference CRIM 1/484 and his pardon is held under reference CRIM 1/585/142. The Home Office and Security Service files on Cooper are held by the National Archives under references HO 45/25805 and KV 2/254 1939 Nov 01-1946 Jul 20 respectively.

=== Later life ===
Cooper was released in January 1953 and is believed to have emigrated to Japan. He reportedly settled in Tokyo, converted to Buddhism and became a language teacher. Author Adrian Weale states that he subsequently returned to England and died in early 1987, aged 67. Another book, Hitler's Bastard, claims he died in the late 1990s.

== See also ==
- List of members of the British Free Corps
- Frank McLardy
- Roy Courlander
