= Eric Pleasants =

British Nazi collaborator

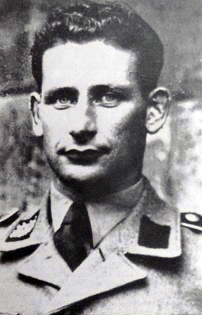
- Eric Pleasants, 1944
- Born: Reginald Pleasants; 17 May 1913; Saxlingham Nethergate, Norfolk, England, United Kingdom
- Died: 1998 (aged 84–85); Norwich, Norfolk, England, United Kingdom
- Military career
- Allegiance: Nazi Germany
- Service years: 1944–1945
- Rank: Schütze
- Unit: British Free Corps

Reginald Eric Pleasants (17 May 1913 – 1998) was a British national who joined the Waffen-SS serving in the British Free Corps during the Second World War.

After the war, Pleasants was captured by the Soviets and spent eight years in Siberian gulags. Despite being in the SS, he was never prosecuted by the British authorities on his post-war return to Britain. The government concluded that the prison time already served by Pleasants constituted enough of a punishment.

== Early life ==
Born in the Norfolk village of Saxlingham Nethergate, Pleasants attended school in Norwich to age 14, then worked variously as trainee electrician, forester, boxer, wrestler and then showman weight-lifter in Britain and continental Europe.

== Second World War ==
In late 1939 he joined the Merchant Navy as a compromise between military call-up and his distaste for war.

He served on a freighter bringing potatoes from Jersey to Southampton, but overstayed his time ashore on the island, missed his boat, and was caught there when the Channel Islands were occupied by the German Army in July 1940. He obtained temporary farm work as a potato picker, but also began stealing from empty properties, resulting in arrest and prosecution in the Magistrate's Court. He was deported by the German occupying authorities, first to Fort d'Hauteville prison near Dijon, France, and eventually to an internment camp in Kreuzburg, Germany.

In Germany, Pleasants chose to join the Waffen SS, and became an SS-Schütze in the British Free Corps which in 1944 became a foreign legion of the Waffen-SS. He claimed to have been invited to join the German broadcasting service from Berlin to Allied and neutral countries, and, in this connection, to have met William Joyce and John Amery, and to have discussed with them the possibilities of charges of treason. He claimed also to have had a sexual relationship with Joyce's wife, Eileen.

In August 1944 he demanded to be returned to his camp. He was stripped of his uniform and summarily despatched to an SS punishment camp at Bandekow near Schwerin, where he worked in a road-making gang, but returned to the BFC in November. He was selected to box for the SS pioneers against the SS police in Prague in late 1944, and won his bout. In late February or early March 1945, Pleasants "got himself attached to Vivian Stranders' embryonic 'Peace Camp' – in reality he spent his time giving exhibition bouts against Max Schmeling in German officers' messes."

Pleasants deserted from the Waffen-SS in 1945 and went into hiding. He "was obliged to kill two Russian soldiers with his bare hands" when they attempted to arrest him in the southern suburbs [of Berlin]. Captured by the Red Army in 1946, he was imprisoned in a Gulag camp at Vorkuta along the Arctic Circle before being repatriated to the United Kingdom in 1954. No action was taken against Pleasants by the British authorities, as his time in Soviet custody was deemed a sufficient punishment for his crimes, albeit he was interviewed.

Pleasants' autobiography was ghost-written by Eddie Chapman, a British safe-breaker and double agent whom Pleasants befriended in German custody, under the title I Killed to Live – The Story of Eric Pleasants as told to Eddie Chapman, Cassell & Co, 1957. Another version appears to have been edited by Ian Sayer and Douglas Botting and published posthumously as Hitler's Bastard: Through Hell and Back in Nazi Germany and Stalin's Russia, Random House, 2012.

== See also ==
- British Free Corps
- List of members of the British Free Corps
