= Raymond Davies Hughes =

British Nazi collaborator

Raymond Davies Hughes (11 August 1923 – 4 April 1999), from Mold, north Wales, was a Liverpool-born RAF airman who made propaganda broadcasts in Welsh for the Germans during World War II.

== Early life ==
Born in the Liverpool suburb of Wavertree, Hughes moved to Mold after his mother married John Hughes, a bricklayer at the John Summers steelworks in Shotton. Hughes first attended Mold Council School, and then in 1937 Alun School. After finishing at the age of 15 he worked for a shoe store in Mold. He was promoted to branch manager in Bangor, but was suddenly dismissed for, as he later claimed, dressing the shop windows while in his shirt sleeves.

== Wartime service ==
Hughes joined the Royal Air Force Volunteer Reserve in 1941 and was selected for flying duties as an air gunner. He was posted to No. 467 Squadron of the Royal Australian Air Force, and within five months made such a favourable impression that he was recommended for an officer's commission.

On 17 August 1943, Hughes was flying his 21st mission as a gunner in a Lancaster bomber, which was participating on a raid on Peenemünde. The crew bailed out after the aircraft was attacked and set on fire by an enemy fighter, and Hughes was captured and sent to a Dulag Luft (a transit camp and interrogation centre for captured aircrew) near Frankfurt.

== Collaboration ==
Hughes initially agreed to hand out what he had been told were Red Cross forms to his fellow prisoners, believing that the data was to be used to help contact the POWs' families. They were in fact forms designed to elicit more personal data than the "name, rank and serial number" which was all that PoWs (Prisoners of War) were required to reveal, which would later be used in interrogations. Hughes soon became useful to the Germans and remained at the Dulag Luft instead of being moved on to a standard PoW camp. His assistance was rewarded by better accommodation and more privileges than other prisoners, including being allowed to wear civilian clothes, and it was even reported that by November 1943 he was wearing a German uniform.

Using the alias of John Charles Baker, Hughes agreed to broadcast propaganda and went to Berlin where he was allowed a substantial degree of freedom, renting a flat while he was employed as a broadcaster and scriptwriter at Radio Metropole, for which he was paid 600 RM monthly. Between January and March 1944 he made several broadcasts in the Welsh language directed at Welsh troops fighting in the Italian campaign. Evidence gathered by MI9, which maintained secret links with Allied PoWs, later suggested that Hughes had also been writing anti-Jewish propaganda for broadcast.

Hughes initially worked under Reinhard Haferkorn, who was the Head of English Propaganda in the German foreign office at the time. Haferkorn had lectured at University of Wales Aberystwyth in the 1920s but had returned to Germany and by 1933 was rated a completely reliable Nazi. Haferkorn was not satisfied with Hughes work, and passed him on to Joseph Goebbels to broadcast in Welsh to Allied troops fighting in the Mediterranean.

Sometime in 1944 Hughes was stripped of his privileges and confined to a POW camp, where he was eventually liberated by the advancing Soviet forces in April 1945. While awaiting transport to Britain he was arrested and charged with voluntarily aiding the enemy while a POW.

== Court-martial ==
Hughes appeared before a court-martial held at RAF Uxbridge in August 1945, where he pleaded not guilty to 11 charges of assisting the enemy, including a charge of giving money to British Free Corps recruiters, an SS unit composed of British and Allied POWs. Haferkorn was a witness, and said that Hughes turned out to be unsuitable for a role in propaganda since he could not write grammatically and had a speech defect because of missing teeth. Hughes was cleared of six of the charges but found guilty of the remaining five, three of which carried a potential death sentence. However, he was eventually sentenced to five years' hard labour, which was subsequently reduced to two years following an appeal for clemency.

He died in Cheltenham, having become a businessman.

== Popular culture ==
Hughes' story was retold in the play Radio Cymru written by Wiliam Owen Roberts, which was produced by the Dalier Sylw theatre company.
