= Alfred Minchin =

British Nazi collaborator

Alfred Vivian Minchin
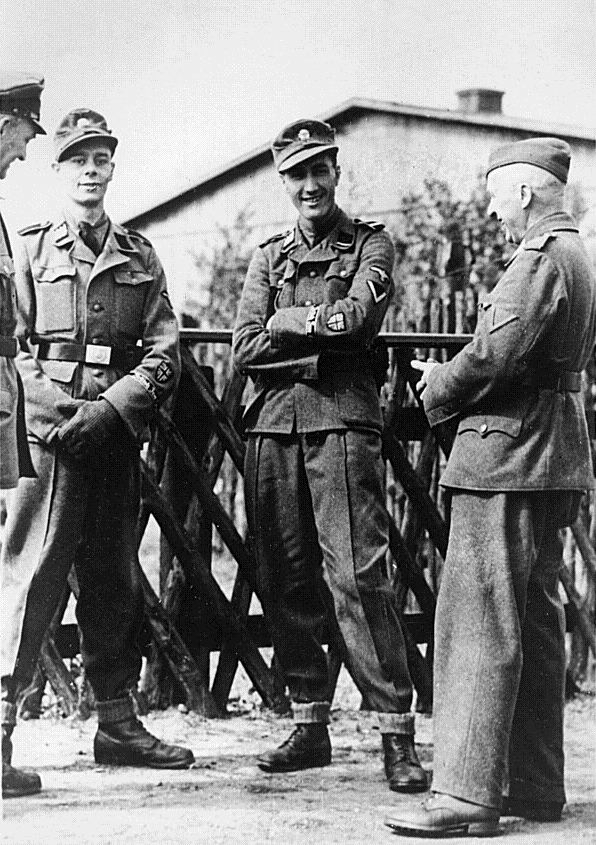
- Alfred Minchin (second right) with SS-Mann Kenneth Berry (second left) and German officers, April 1944
- Born: 27 January 1917; Kingston upon Thames, Surrey, England
- Died: February 1998 (aged 81); Somerset, England, United Kingdom
- Occupation: British merchant seaman
- Status: Deceased
- Conviction: Conspiracy to assist the enemy
- Penalty: 7 years' imprisonment

Alfred Vivian Minchin (27 January 1917 – February 1998) was a British merchant seaman who was taken prisoner by a German destroyer after his ship, the SS Empire Ranger, one of a Murmansk convoy, was sunk by German bombers off Norway. He held the rank of Sturmmann in the Waffen-SS British Free Corps during the Second World War. He was taken prisoner on 28 March 1942. It was he who suggested the name for the British Free Corps. By 8 March 1945 he 'was being treated for scabies in the SS hospital at Lichtefelde-West.' The National Archives holds the depositions for his trial at the Central Criminal Court under reference CRIM 1/485. and a Home Office file on him under reference HO 45/25817 He was "convicted at Central Criminal Court on 5 February 1946 of conspiring to assist the enemy and sentenced to 7 years' penal servitude" for offences against the Defence Regulations. He died in Somerset in February 1998 at the age of 81.

== See also ==
- British Free Corps
- List of members of the British Free Corps
