= Stalag XVIII-A =

World War II German Army (Wehrmacht) prisoner-of-war camp

Oflag XVIII-B/Stalag XVIII-A
- Wolfsberg, Carinthia
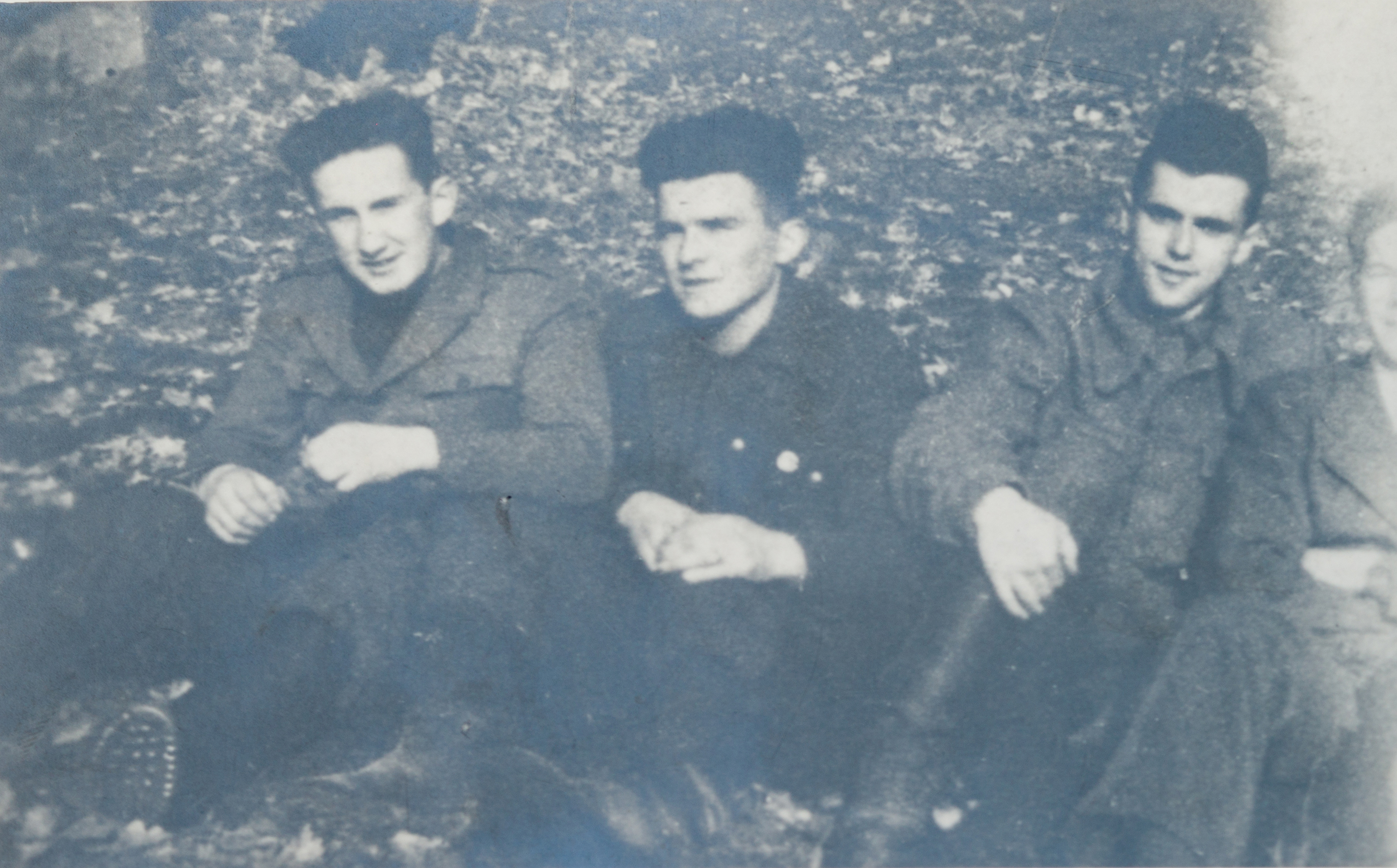
- Italian prisoners of war in Stalag XVIII-A

Site information
- Type: Prisoner-of-war camp
- Controlled by: Nazi Germany

Location
- Wolfsberg, Austria
- Coordinates: 46.829605°N 14.837633°E

Site history
- In use: 1939–1945
- Battles/wars: World War II

Garrison information
- Occupants: Polish, Belgian and French officers (in Oflag XVIII-B); French, Belgian, British, Commonwealth, Soviet, Italian, Polish prisoners of war (in Stalag XVIII-A)

Stalag XVIII-A was a World War II German Army (Wehrmacht) prisoner-of-war camp located to the south of the town of Wolfsberg, in the southern Austrian state of Carinthia, then a part of Nazi Germany. A sub-camp Stalag XVIII-A/Z was later opened in Spittal an der Drau about 100 km (62 mi) to the west.

== Camp history ==
The camp, first designated Oflag XVIII-B, was opened at the site of a former parade ground on 19 October 1939, after the German invasion of Poland. The first inmates were Polish officers, from Spring 1940 also Belgian and French officers captured in the Battle of France. Wolfsberg remained a sub-camp of Stalag XVII-A Kaisersteinbruch, until in March 1941 the officers were transferred to other camps and the camp was redesignated a Stalag of the military district XVIII, with French and Belgian prisoners being transferred in from Stalag XVII-A. The first British and Commonwealth prisoners arrived in July 1941 from a transit camp in Thessaloniki, Greece, having been captured during the battles of Greece and Crete. The first Soviet prisoners arrived in October 1941, and were housed in a separate enclosure.

In December a typhus epidemic broke out, and the entire camp was quarantined until March 1942. Many prisoners died, mainly Russians, as their living conditions and rations were substantially inferior to the other prisoners. In June 1942, to ease overcrowding, three new barracks were built, and 400 British NCOs were transferred to Stalag XVIII-B at Spittal. In January 1943 the camp at Spittal became a Zweiglager (sub-camp) of Wolfsberg, and was redesignated as Stalag XVIII-A/Z. In March 1943 a Lazarett ("Camp Hospital") was built there.

In November 1943, after the Italian armistice, Italian and Commonwealth prisoners arrived from Italy. Two hundred NCOs were transferred to Stalag XVIII-C at Markt-Pongau in June 1944. That month there were a total of 38,831 prisoners registered at the camp. Of these 10,667 were British and Commonwealth troops, of which only 825 were in the main camp, while the rest were attached to various Arbeitskommandos ("Labour Units"). In August 1944, according to a Red Cross report, there were 313 Arbeitskommandos attached to Stalag XVIII-A, which were split fairly equally between Landwirtschaft (agriculture or forestry) and Gewerbliche Wirtschaft (trade and industry). There were several attempts to escape, primarily from the Arbeitskommandos.

On 15 November 1944, a group of Polish insurgents of the suppressed Warsaw Uprising was brought from Stalag XVIII-C in Markt-Pongau, and then sent to forced labour.

On 18 December 1944 the camp was bombed by U.S. aircraft. Forty-six prisoners and several guards were killed. Both the British and French camp hospitals were hit, with the British hut being almost completely destroyed. On the approach of Allied forces in April 1945 all fit prisoners from the camps and neighbouring labour units were marched east to Stalag XVIII-C.

Officially, the camp was liberated by elements of the British 8th Army on 11 May 1945. In fact the prisoners had been in control of the camp since the 8th, the day of the German surrender. That day the Kommandant, Hauptmann Steiner, had handed over control of the camp to the Senior British Medical Officer and the "Men of Confidence". French and British prisoners disarmed their guards and took control of the camp armoury, and the local Post Office, Railway Station and Police Station. Over the next few weeks the prisoners were transported via Klagenfurt to transit camps in Bari and Naples, from where they were eventually repatriated. By the middle of June only Russian prisoners remained, these were eventually exchanged for British and American PoWs in Russian hands, near Graz. The camp then served as a British detention centre for ex-Nazis, before finally closing in mid-1947.

== Postwar ==
After the war, the camp was run by the British occupation forces for the internment and interrogation of former Nazi officials and war criminals from Carinthia and Styria; several were extradited to Yugoslavia or the Nuremberg trials. Renamed "Camp 373", it housed up to 7,000 inmates until its closure in 1948.

== See also ==
- List of prisoner-of-war camps in Germany
