= British Free Corps =

Foreign Waffen-SS unit

- Britisches Freikorps
- Armshield
- Active: 1 January 1944–2 May 1945
- Allegiance: Nazi Germany
- Branch: Waffen-SS
- Type: Infantry
- Role: Waffen-SS auxiliary
- Size: 54 (total membership); 27 (maximum strength)
- Part of: 11th SS Volunteer Panzergrenadier Division Nordland
- Patron: Saint George
- Engagements: World War II: Bombing of Dresden; Battle of the Oder–Neisse; Battle of Berlin

The British Free Corps (abbr. BFC; German: Britisches Freikorps) was a unit of the Waffen-SS of Nazi Germany during World War II, made up of British and Dominion prisoners of war who had been recruited by Germany. The unit was originally known as the Legion of St George. Research by British historian Adrian Weale has identified 54 men who belonged to this unit at one time or another, some for only a few days. At no time did it reach more than 27 men in strength.

== Formation ==
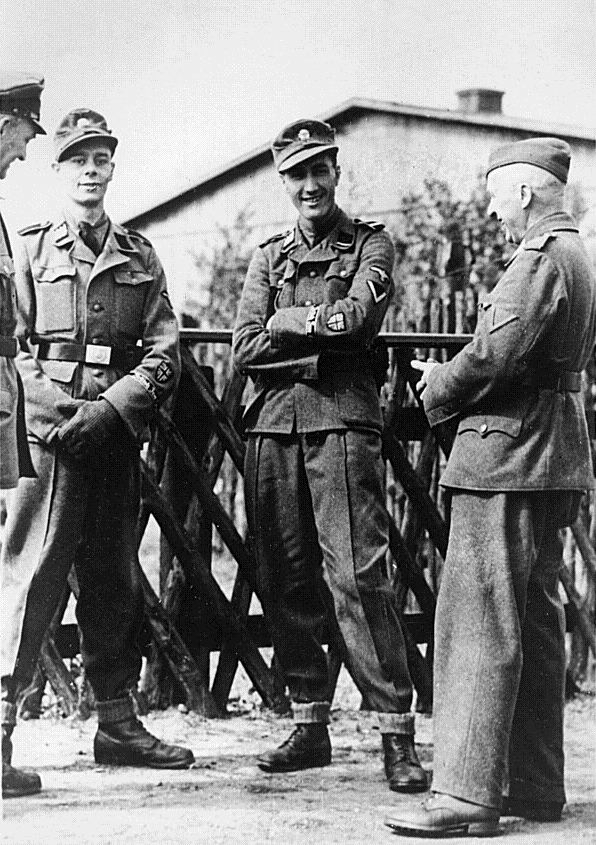
Two early recruits to the BFC: Kenneth Berry (second left) and Alfred Minchin (second right), with German officers, April 1944

The idea for the British Free Corps came from John Amery, a British fascist, son of the serving British Secretary of State for India, Leo Amery. John Amery travelled to Berlin in October 1942, and proposed to the Germans the formation of a British volunteer force to help fight the Bolsheviks. The British volunteer force was to be modelled after the Légion des volontaires français contre le bolchévisme (Legion of French Volunteers against Bolshevism), a French collaborationist force fighting with the German Wehrmacht. In addition to touting the idea of a British volunteer force, Amery actively tried to recruit Britons. He made a series of pro-German propaganda radio broadcasts, appealing to his fellow countrymen to join the war on communism.

The first recruits to the Corps came from a group of prisoners of war (POWs) at a 'holiday camp' set up by the Germans in Genshagen, a suburb of Berlin, in August 1943. In November 1943, they were moved to a requisitioned café in the Pankow district of Berlin. Recruits also came from an interrogation camp at Luckenwalde in late 1943. The Corps became a military unit on 1 January 1944, under the name 'The British Free Corps'. Freikorps is a longstanding German term for irregular paramilitary volunteer units. In the first week of February 1944, the BFC moved to the St Michaeli Kloster in Hildesheim, a small town near Hanover. Uniforms were issued on 20 April 1944 (Hitler's 55th birthday). On 11 October 1944, the Corps was moved to the Waffen-SS Pioneer school in Dresden, to start military training for service on the Eastern Front. On 24 February 1945, they travelled from Dresden to Berlin, where they stayed in a requisitioned school on the Schönhauser Allee. On 8 March 1945, they were moved to the village of Niemegk, a few miles to the south-west of Berlin.

Recruiting for the Free Corps was done in German POW camps. In 1944, leaflets were distributed to the POWs, and the unit was mentioned in Camp, the official POW newspaper published in Berlin. The unit was promoted "as a thoroughly volunteer unit, conceived and created by British subjects from all parts of the Empire who have taken up arms and pledged their lives in the common European struggle against Soviet Russia".

The attempted recruitment of POWs was done amid German fear of the Soviets; the Germans were "victims of their own propaganda" and thought that their enemies were as worried about the Soviets as they were. In one Dutch camp, cigarettes, fruit, and other items were lavished on the POWs while they listened to Nazi propaganda officers who described the good that the Germans were doing in Europe, then asked the men to join in fighting the real enemy, the Soviets.

== Commanders ==
The BFC did not have a "commander" per se as it was the intention of the SS to appoint a British commander when a suitable British officer came forward. However, three German Waffen-SS officers acted as the Verbindungsoffizier ("liaison officer") between the SS-Hauptamt Amtsgruppe D/3, which was responsible for the unit and the British volunteers, and in practice they acted as the unit commander for disciplinary purposes at least. These were:

- SS-Hauptsturmführer Hans Werner Roepke: September 1943 – November 1944
- SS-Obersturmführer Dr Walter Kühlich: November 1944 – April 1945
- SS-Hauptsturmführer Dr Alexander Dolezalek: April 1945

A number of sources mention the involvement of Brigadier Leonard Parrington, a British Army officer captured by the Germans in Greece in 1941. This was based on a misunderstanding by some of the British volunteers after Parrington in the summer of 1943 had visited the POW "holiday camp" at Genshagen, in the southern suburbs of Berlin, as representative of the Senior British POW, Major General Victor Fortune. Parrington had told the assembled prisoners that he "knew the purpose of the camp" and the BFC volunteers who were there took this to mean that he approved of the unit. In reality, Parrington had accepted Genshagen at face value as a rest centre for POWs.

At one stage, it seemed that the Germans might have found the British commander for whom they had long been searching, in the guise of the collaborator, Douglas Berneville-Claye. Dispatched by Obergruppenführer Gottlob Berger, from the SS Depot Berlin, Berneville-Claye arrived at the III (Germanic) SS Panzer Corps at Templin, dressed in a German field grey uniform as an SS Hauptsturmführer. After his papers from Berlin were checked and found to be in order, he was invited to dinner by the III Corps commander, Obergruppenführer Felix Steiner. For dinner, Berneville-Claye changed into a black uniform of the Waffen-SS panzer (tank) corps. In discussion, he explained to Steiner that he was a firm anti-Bolshevist and wished to defend Europe from communism. Accordingly, Steiner suggested that the following day Berneville-Claye should meet with the rest of the BFC and take command, for by this stage Steiner had withdrawn the BFC from the front line and assigned them to his Corps headquarters at Templin.

Thus, on 19 April 1945, Berneville-Claye went to meet the BFC ‘dressed in the black uniform of an SS panzer officer’. Berneville-Claye addressed the BFC renegades thus: ‘I have come to talk to you boys about coming to my company’. Launching into a speech, Berneville-Claye declared that he was a Coldstream Guards officer, the son of an earl, and had come to lead them in battle against the Russians. He said that he was their new commander, that they should now take orders from him, and that he had at his disposal two armoured cars. Moreover, he assured them that all that such action was supportive of Britain’s cause, for the country was sure to be at war with Russia very shortly. However, Berneville-Claye’s speech did not go down well with the BFC men, for none of them were in the least bit inclined to return to the front line. Upon realising that his endeavour was futile, Berneville-Claye departed shortly afterwards, taking Alexander MacKinnon, one of the BFC soldiers, as a driver, and returned to Steiner's headquarters.

== Members ==
Leading members of the Corps included Thomas Haller Cooper (although he was actually an Unterscharführer in the Waffen-SS proper), Roy Courlander, Edwin Barnard Martin, Frank McLardy, Alfred Minchin and John Wilson – these men "later became known among the renegades as the 'Big Six', although this was a notional elite whose membership shifted periodically as members fell into, and out of, favour."

In 2002, it was claimed that Robert Chipchase, an Australian, was by then the last surviving member of the British Free Corps. He commented that he had changed his mind about joining and refused to sign the enlistment papers, spending the rest of the war in a punishment camp.

== Preparation for active service ==
In March 1945, a BFC detachment was deployed with the 11th SS Volunteer Panzergrenadier Division Nordland under Brigadeführer Joachim Ziegler, which was composed largely of Scandinavian volunteers and attached to the III (Germanic) SS Panzer Corps under Obergruppenführer Felix Steiner. They were first sent from Stettin to the division's headquarters at Angermünde. "From there they were sent to join the divisional armoured reconnaissance battalion (11. SS-Panzer-AufklärunGsabteilung) located in Grüssow [on the island of Usedom]. The battalion commander was Sturmbannführer Rudolf Saalbach ... [The BFC were allocated] to the 3rd Company, under the command of the Swedish Obersturmführer Hans-Gösta Pehrson." The BFC contingent was commanded by SS-Scharführer (squad leader) Douglas Mardon, who used the alias "Hodge". Author Richard W. Landwehr Jr. states "The Britons were sent to a company in the detachment that was situated in the small village of Schoenburg near the west bank of the Oder River".

On 16 April 1945, the Corps was moved to Templin, where they were to join the transport company of Steiner's HQ staff (Kraftfahrstaffel Stab Steiner). When the Nordland Division left for Berlin, "the transport company followed Steiner's Headquarters to Neustrelitz and the BFC went with it." On 29 April, Steiner decided "to break contact with the Russians and order his forces to head west into Anglo-American captivity." Thomas Haller Cooper and Fred Croft, the last two members of the Corps, surrendered on 2 May to the 121st U.S. Infantry Regiment in Schwerin, and were placed in the loose custody of the GHQ Liaison Regiment (known as Phantom).

== Courts-martial ==
Newspapers of the period give details of the court-martial of several Commonwealth soldiers involved in the Corps. One Canadian captive, Private Edwin Barnard Martin, said he joined the Corps "to wreck it". He designed the flag and banner used by the Corps, and admitted to being one of the original six or seven members of the Corps during his trial. He was given a travel warrant and a railway pass which allowed him to move around Germany without a guard. He was found guilty of two charges of aiding the enemy while a prisoner of war.

New Zealand soldier Roy Courlander claimed at his court-martial that he joined the Corps for similar reasons, to gather intelligence on the Germans, to foster a revolution behind the German lines, or to sabotage the unit if the revolution failed.

John Amery was sentenced to death in November 1945 for high treason, and hanged on 19 December 1945.

== In popular culture ==
- The film Joy Division (2006) portrays a member of the BFC, Sergeant Harry Stone, among the German troops and refugees fleeing the Red Army advance into Germany. In the film it is the aggressive Stone who appears to be the only convinced Nazi remaining among the Hitler Youth with whom he is grouped. He is seen attempting to recruit British POWs before the column is attacked by Soviet aircraft.
- Jack Higgins' novel The Eagle Has Landed portrays a BFC officer named Harvey Preston, who is patterned on Douglas Berneville-Claye. He is attached to the Fallschirmjäger unit which attempts to kidnap Winston Churchill. A convinced Nazi and petty criminal, Preston is viewed with disgust by all members of the German unit.
- On TV, the British Free Corps was a subject for "The Hide", the final episode of series 6 of the British TV series Foyle's War, in which a British POW who had joined the BFC was tried for treason in Great Britain once he returned home, after surviving the firebombing of Dresden.

== Gallery ==
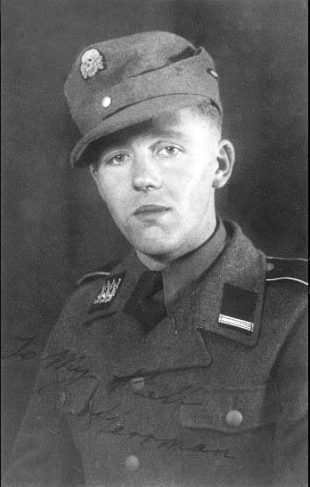
SS-Rottenführer William Brittain, February 1945

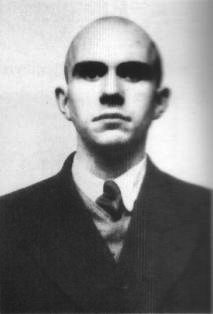
SS-Oberscharführer Thomas Haller Cooper (British mugshot, 1945)

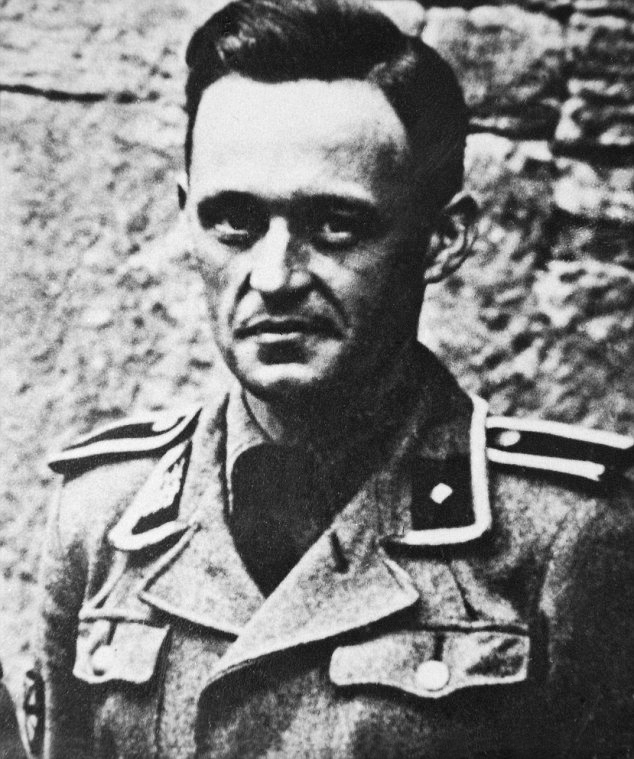
SS-Unterscharführer Roy Courlander, 1944

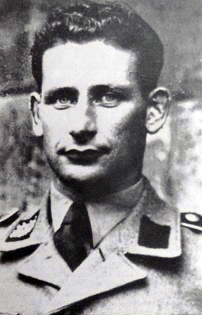
SS-Mann Eric Reginald Pleasants, 1944

== See also ==
- Non-Germans in the German armed forces during World War II
- Friesack Camp, attempt to raise an "Irish Brigade"
- Indian Legion
- List of members of the British Free Corps
- Waffen-SS foreign volunteers and conscripts
- Fusilier James Brady
- John Codd
- Free Corps Denmark
