= James Brady (SS) =

Irish Nazi collaborator

James Brady (born 20 May 1920, date of death unknown) was one of two Irishmen known to have served in the Waffen-SS during World War II.

Brady, who was from County Roscommon, originally volunteered for the Royal Irish Fusiliers, an Irish Regiment in the British Army, in late 1938. After basic training in Hampshire, he was posted to the Channel Islands in May 1939. In that month he and another Irishman, Frank Stringer from County Leitrim, were imprisoned after attacking and injuring a local policeman and were captured by the Germans when they invaded the islands in June 1940.

The Germans transferred the pair to a POW camp but soon transferred them to the special Abwehr facility at Friesack Camp to recruit them as saboteurs. Stringer proved willing to co-operate; and, in September 1941, he and John Codd were transferred to Berlin to begin explosives training at the Abwehr training camp at Quentzgut. That December, Brady and a group of other Irishmen were also transferred to Berlin to begin similar training. This latter group, however, would seem to have been secretly working on the orders of the Senior British Officer at Friesack to sabotage the German scheme; by September 1942, all the Irishmen involved were imprisoned by the Germans, some in Sachsenhausen concentration camp.

In early 1943, Brady and Stringer were released by the Germans and kept in readiness for Operation Osprey. Subsequently, they volunteered for the Waffen-SS and underwent training at Cernay in occupied Alsace-Lorraine. In January 1944, they were recruited to SS-Sonderverband z.b.V. Friedenthal (later: SS-Jäger-Bataillon 502 and later still SS-Jagdverband Mitte), a special forces unit under the command of Otto Skorzeny.

In late 1944, Brady was involved in Operation Landfried (behind the lines operations in Romania) and in Operation Panzerfaust, the raid on Budapest to prevent Admiral Miklós Horthy from making a separate peace with the Soviets. He also fought at Schwedt an Oder with Skorzeny's ad hoc division in January 1945 and was wounded at the Zehden bridgehead in March. He later fought in the Battle of Berlin.

Brady surrendered to the British Army in 1946. He was court-martialled for aiding the enemy while a prisoner of war and sentenced to fifteen years in prison, of which the General Officer Commanding London District remitted three years. Brady was released from prison in 1950 and returned to Ireland, where he later died.

== Sources ==
- Hull, Mark M. Irish Secrets. German Espionage in Wartime Ireland 1939-1945, 2003, ISBN 0-7165-2756-1
- Murphy, Sean. Letting the Side Down: British Traitors of the Second World War, PP 222–223. London: The History Press Ltd, 2005. ISBN 0-7509-4176-6
- O'Reilly, Terence Hitler's Irishmen 2008 ISBN 1-85635-589-6
- "Penal Servitude For Serving With Enemy." Times, London, England. 20 Dec. 1946: 2. The Times Digital Archive. Web. 16 Apr. 2015.
- Court-martial papers - WO 71/1149
