= Douglas Berneville-Claye =

British Nazi collaborator (1917–1975)

Douglas Berneville Webster Claye
- Born: 26 November 1917; Plumstead, London, England
- Died: 26 June 1975 (aged 57); Campbelltown, New South Wales, Australia
- Citizenship: British, then Australian
- Occupations: Military officer, teacher
- Known for: Nazi collaborator, military impostor
- Spouse(s): Ada Metcalfe (relationship) Irene Palmer (m. 1936) Nina Payne (m. 1940) Marie Langley (relationship) Margaret Murdoch (m. 1949) Gisela (m. 1950) 'Jenny' (relationship, c. 1957)
- Children: Metcalfe daughter, b. 1935 Palmer daughter, b. 1937; Payne son, b. 1940; Langley child, c. 1945; Gisela children: three sons, one daughter Jenny child, c. 1957 (adopted out)
- Parent(s): Frederick Wainwright Claye, Daisy Jackson

Douglas Webster St Aubyn Berneville-Claye (26 November 1917 – 16 June 1975), born Douglas Berneville Claye, was a British Nazi collaborator and member of the SS British Free Corps during the Second World War.

== Early life ==
Douglas Berneville Webster Claye was born in Plumstead, London on 26 November 1917, the son of a staff sergeant in the Royal Army Service Corps. His subsequent name change to Douglas Webster St Aubyn Berneville-Claye, achieved by adding one of his given names to make the hyphenated "Berneville-Claye" occurred much later, but where "St Aubyn" came from is unknown. His father's family, the Clays, Websters, and Wainwrights, were industrial working-class from Leeds, Yorkshire. His father, Frederick Wainwright Claye, and mother, Daisy (née Jackson), were married in Woolwich Register Office on 14 September 1912. His father was awarded an MBE in 1919 for "valuable service rendered in connection with military operations in France", and retired in the rank of captain in 1920.

Berneville-Claye was educated in local schools and in March 1933 enrolled at the Army Technical School at Chepstow. However, in August 1934, he was discharged from the Army Technical School and returned to his parents' public house at Little Ouseburn, a village on the Roman road between Ripon and York. Having retired from the army after long service, his father and mother ran the pub there from December 1933 to November 1936. It was at his parents' pub that he met Ada Metcalfe, a scullery maid, and their relationship resulted in a daughter, Margaret ("Maggie") Metcalfe, born in August 1935, both of whom he abandoned. Maggie was the first of some ten children that Berneville-Claye would eventually sire. Meanwhile, in December 1934, he joined the 16th/5th Queen's Royal Lancers at York, which is where he learned to ride, and he served with the regiment until June 1936, when he was discharged.

Having left the Army in the summer of 1936, Berneville-Claye secured work as an instructor at a riding school near Thames Ditton, and, having met Irene Palmer, they married, legitimately, in October 1936. However, the following year he left Irene, while she was pregnant with their daughter, Yvonne, who was born in June 1937. When Irene next heard of him a decade later, it was in a tabloid newspaper, following his court martial in April 1946. Meanwhile, in August 1937, he re-enlisted in the Army, this time with the 12th Royal Lancers. However, in October 1938 he was discharged again from the Army, for the third time as "services no longer required". Following his Army discharge, from October 1938 until the summer of 1939, it appears that he worked as a freelance journalist in London and later in Leeds. In the interim, in June 1938 he met Nina Payne, in Torquay. The following year, in March 1940, Berneville-Claye married the heavily pregnant Nina and she became his second wife, albeit bigamously, and shortly thereafter she gave birth to their son, Graeme.

== World War Two ==
On the outbreak of the Second World War, Berneville-Claye volunteered for the Royal Air Force and was accepted as an aircrew trainee at Cardington and then went to Cambridge for aircrew training, this being his fourth period of military service within six years. However, he was discharged in March 1940 as "unlikely to make an efficient pilot". His discharge (after some seven months, and close to the end of his training) was just three days after his second (and first bigamous) marriage to Nina Payne. The bigamous nature of this marriage would only come to light much later, at Berneville-Claye's April 1946 court martial.

Following this, Berneville-Claye found a job in an aircraft factory and, in late 1940, joined the Home Guard. He borrowed his father's old uniform and began wearing it in public, with a set of RAF pilot's wings attached. While doing so he was involved in a traffic accident, and after hospital treatment was sent to a convalescent home for officers. While there, he stole another officer's cheque book and after a police investigation was discovered to have obtained the sum of £5 10s by deception. In January 1941, now residing at Horsforth, he appeared before magistrates and was additionally fined £7 for impersonating an officer. Although he was remanded for trial, the charges were eventually dropped because he had repaid the money he had stolen and agreed to be bound over for two years.

=== Active service ===
It was at this time that Claye started referring to himself by his invented moniker, the Honourable Douglas St Aubyn Webster Berneville-Claye, with the title Lord Charlesworth. He also cultivated for himself a "smart" accent to complement the aristocratic family background that he invented. In January 1941, he enlisted as a private soldier in the West Yorkshire Regiment, this being the 5th (or 6th if one counts the Home Guard) period of military training. He did not stay in the ranks for long. At enlistment, he claimed to have been educated at Charterhouse School, Magdalen College, Oxford, and Emmanuel College, Cambridge, and as a result was selected for officer training. His officer training commenced in June 1941 and was conducted at Pwllheli and Sandhurst. Somewhat surprisingly, he passed; perhaps on account of it being a relatively short 4-month war course, for an "Emergency Commission".

In October 1941, having been granted his commission as a second lieutenant, Berneville-Claye joined the 11th Battalion, West Yorkshire Regiment, on the Isle of Wight, and then in November the battalion was posted to Dorset, and thereafter to Somerset. In January 1942, he was placed in close arrest, again charged with cheque fraud and court-martialled, but he carried out his own legal representation (claiming to be a barrister). The court record stated, besides being educated at Charterhouse, Oxford and Cambridge, he was a barrister in civilian life, and that he conducted his defence with a good degree of skill. He persuaded the court that the cause of the cheques being dishonoured was neglect rather than dishonesty. He got off lightly and was only sentenced to be reprimanded. Nonetheless, his commanding officer evidently took a dim view of things, for the following month in February 1942 he was posted from 11th Battalion, West Yorkshires to 2nd/5th Battalion, West Yorkshires in Folkestone. By June he was struck off strength of that battalion for embarkation overseas.

By June 1942, Berneville-Claye had been assigned to the Infantry Base Depot at Geneifa in Egypt. It may be that it was originally intended that he should subsequently join 2nd Battalion, West Yorkshires, at that time in Tobruk; but he arrived at a turning point in the Desert War, for Tobruk fell to the enemy in June, and GHQ Middle East then planned a series of concurrent large operations including raids upon Tobruk and Benghazi Harbour. The raid on Benghazi Harbour, dubbed Operation BIGAMY, was assigned to the commander of L Detachment of the Special Air Service (SAS), Major David Stirling. Stirling required some 200 men for the Benghazi raid, and at this stage he only had 100 in his squadron-sized force. He was forced to recruit more men and first sought them from amongst the Middle East commando forces, but he also looked wider including the Infantry Depot, and during this trawl Berneville-Claye volunteered, having evidently charmed Stirling.

Thus, in August 1942, Berneville-Claye joined the SAS. With no time for any formal SAS training before Operation Bigamy scheduled for September, he and a number of other men recruited in Stirling's trawl would have to rely upon "on the job" training. The Benghazi raid as well as the Tobruk raid) both suffered from poor security; and, close to the target, Stirling received word that the enemy was expecting his force. Regardless, he was instructed by GHQ Middle East to continue with the attack but, with the element of surprise lost, the SAS force was beaten back by a well-prepared enemy and had to withdraw across the desert.

In the aftermath of Operation Bigamy, the majority of temporary attachments to the SAS were returned to their units, but Berneville-Claye was selected to continue service with the SAS, in A Squadron. Berneville-Claye arrived back in Cairo in late September and was promoted to war substantive lieutenant. This was a period of momentous change for the SAS itself, which was expanded from squadron size and granted regimental status within the British Army on 28 September 1942. Berneville-Claye was formally gazetted to the strength of the 1st SAS Regiment, on 1 October, following its formation as a regiment.

Berneville-Claye next took part in the second of his three major operations with the SAS. This being the SAS role in supporting the Eighth Army, in the Second Battle of El Alamein, codenamed Operation Lightfoot, planned for the night of 23/24 October 1942. The SAS role was to operate behind enemy lines, preceding, during and in the aftermath of Operation Lightfoot, conducting raids on enemy lines of communications, including attacks against enemy airfields. The Second Battle of El Alamein was an emphatic success, and, with it, Allied fortunes changed in the North African campaign.

The previous year, in 1941, the US had entered the war, and joint Anglo-US forces were now poised to land in French North-West Africa, in Operation Torch, during November. With A Squadron's role in support of Operation Lightfoot successfully concluded, the SAS began to prepare for their next task. This was Operation Palmyra, the SAS role in supporting Eighth Army's push westward to Tripoli, which was scheduled to begin in mid-December 1942. Again, the SAS role was to conduct behind-the-lines raids on the enemy. This was Berneville-Claye's third distinct operation with the SAS. It was also his final, for it was during this period that he was captured by the enemy.

=== Capture by the enemy ===
In December 1942, in the week leading up to Christmas, Berneville-Claye was captured by the enemy in the vicinity of Tripoli, during Operation Palmyra, while serving with A Squadron SAS behind enemy lines. It was not until some three weeks later, on 13 January 1943, that his capture was formally recorded in the 1 SAS War Diary as "... reported missing on operations in W. Desert, 23-12-42". Berneville-Claye thus served for four months with the SAS prior to his capture and becoming a prisoner of war (POW). The following month, in late January 1943, Stirling himself would be captured, and the two would later come across one another as POWs.

Following capture, Berneville-Claye was sent from North Africa to Italy where he was interrogated and processed through several Italian Prisoner of War transit camps in northern Italy, from which he later claimed to have made repeated escapes. Thereafter he was sent to Stalag VIIIB, in Lamsdorf, Germany. After the Italian Armistice in September 1943, Berneville-Claye and his POWs were evacuated to Germany where, by April 1944, he ended up in Oflag 79 at Waggum, near Brunswick.

=== Collaboration with the enemy ===
During 1944, the British POWs in Oflag 79 began to suspect that one of their number was an informer, and they eventually decided that it was Berneville-Claye. In February 1945, Berneville-Claye was removed from Oflag 79 Brunswick, by the Germans, for his own safety. This was after the Senior British Officer warned them that, convinced of Berneville-Claye's guilt, the British POWs were planning to try him for being an informer and intended to carry out an execution if he was found guilty. A lengthy Summary of Evidence on Berneville-Claye's activities was compiled and this was addressed to the Under Secretary of State for War, and to the British Security Service, MI5. Meanwhile, in March 1945, under the orders of the SS Obergruppenführer Gottlob Berger, Chief of the Main Office in Berlin, Berneville-Claye was moved to Stalag XIB in Fallingbostel, where he stayed for a week before being moved again by Gottlob Berger.

In the interim, Berneville-Claye was seen in and around Fallingbostel, sporting the uniform of a German captain, with a "pass" signed and stamped by the Germans, allowing him liberty. Next he went to Berlin, where he was given a role at the SS Main Headquarters. Subsequently, Gottlob Berger, the senior officer, dispatched Berneville-Claye to Obergruppenführer Felix Steiner's Waffen-SS Headquarters on the Eastern Front.

Berneville-Claye arrived at the III (Germanic) SS Panzer Corps at Templin, dressed in a German field grey uniform as an SS Hauptsturmführer. He was invited to dine by the III Corps commander, Felix Steiner, for which he changed into a black uniform of the Waffen-SS panzer (tank) corps. He explained to Steiner that while he was a captain in the Coldstream Guards and a member of the British peerage, "Lord Charlesworth", he was a firm anti-communist and had volunteered to fight to preserve Europe from the communist threat. He was so convincing that Steiner took him at face value.

It was at dinner that Felix Steiner suggested that the following day Berneville-Claye should meet with the rest of the British Free Corps (BFC), for, by this stage, Steiner had withdrawn the BFC from the front line and assigned them to his Corps headquarters at Templin. Steiner decided to appoint Berneville-Claye to take charge of them. Thus, on 19 April 1945 Berneville-Claye went to meet the BFC "dressed in a black SS tank uniform bearing the insignia of Hauptsturmführer in the British Free Corps." Berneville-Claye told the BFC members "that he was the son of an earl and a captain in the Coldstream Guards and was going to collect two armoured cars and lead them against the Russians. He also guaranteed that the BFC men would be in no trouble with the British authorities, telling them that Britain would be at war with the Russians within a few days." When the BFC members refused to follow him, Berneville-Claye departed but took Alexander MacKinnon, one of the BFC soldiers, as a driver. Returning to Steiner's headquarters, they remained for a few days, and Berneville-Claye lodged in a nearby house and took his meals in the German officers' mess.

By the end of that month, on 29 April, Hitler committed suicide in his Berlin Führerbunker. SS Obergruppenführer Felix Steiner instructed his officers to break contact with the Russians, and to head west and give themselves up to Anglo-American forces. Berneville-Claye departed with MacKinnon in the German Opel staff car that had been provided for his use and, over the next few days, headed west towards the small town of Bad Kleinen, near Schwerin. On the morning of 2 May 1945, Berneville-Claye was informed by a German soldier that Allied forces were only 8 kilometres (5.0 mi) away. Berneville-Claye changed out of and threw away his SS uniform and put on his British battledress, which he kept in his kit. When US forces reached them, Berneville-Claye and MacKinnon approached and explained that they were British POWs, and several days later they were subsequently handed over to the British.

Within a week, Berneville-Claye was repatriated to England, on 7 May 1945, the eve of Victory in Europe Day.

=== Post-war British Security Service investigation ===
British Officers who had been in Oflag 79 were also repatriated, and they volunteered information on Berneville-Claye to the Security Service (MI5) along with the Summary of Evidence. A lengthy MI5 investigation then commenced.

Upon repatriation, Berneville-Claye was initially sent to Number6 15 Officer Reception Unit, Monk Fryston Hall, near Leeds, and thereafter was given a period of leave, before being posted to 6 Infantry Holding Battalion at Hunstanton, Norfolk. Subsequently, he worked for three weeks with the Control Commission, Germany, in the rank of acting captain. MI5 made it plain that while under investigation he should remain in the UK, and so he was posted to a Transport Company, Royal Army Service Corps (RASC), in Norwich. While there, Berneville-Claye commenced an affair with Marie Langley, a private soldier in his RASC company and under his command. She became pregnant and as a result of this and other misconduct, Berneville-Claye was posted to another company of RASC and placed in "close arrest" for a total of 114 days, until the first of two courts martial for which he stood trial in 1946.

At Berneville-Claye's first court martial, in April 1946, he was charged with 13 offences, including stealing petrol, bouncing cheques, using an official vehicle without permission, as well as improper association with Marie Langley, a soldier under his command. He was sentenced to be cashiered (dismissed from the Service). Berneville-Claye's luck held, for this sentence was later varied "to be severely reprimanded and to lose a year's seniority".

Marie Langley later put their baby up for adoption, as Berneville-Claye took no responsibility. The News of the World report on this first court martial was how his first wife, Irene (married in 1936), first heard of Berneville-Claye's whereabouts having left her some ten years before. It was also how Irene learnt that he had bigamously married a second wife, Nina (married in 1940), and had a five-year old son, Graeme.

As a result, in July 1946, Berneville-Claye was charged with bigamy and stood trial in court. He stated that 'a girl "seduced" him into an impossible marriage when he was 17... the skill of her applied psychology'. For this first bigamous marriage, he did not go to prison but was sentenced only to be "bound over" for twelve months and required not to re-offend.

Twenty-eight-year-old temporary captain Berneville-Claye then fell foul of Army authorities again and, in September 1946, underwent a second court martial at Cameron Barracks, Inverness. He was found guilty of four charges: two of stealing a quantity of coal and petrol, one of improperly using a War Department vehicle, and one for stealing a typewriter. He was sentenced to be cashiered and to be imprisoned for 6 months. This time the sentence stuck.

Meanwhile, the MI5 investigation continued. Berneville-Claye stuck doggedly to his story that his actions had all been part of an elaborate ruse to escape, which he himself declared to be an incredible story. However, certain key German witnesses could not be tracked down, and it was perceived that the testimony of other BFC renegades would be considered tainted. With the possibility of the death sentence for treachery hanging over his head, the authorities did not consider they had a watertight case. Although grave suspicion resided in the minds of those in MI5 and the military authorities, with Berneville-Claye already having been cashiered and in jail, they chose to close his file.

== Post-war life ==
Following his court martial, Berneville-Claye was released from prison after six months. Scotland Yard later confirmed that he was subsequently back in prison for "fraudulent conversion". He was also in Paris for several months, with a criminal gang, involved in smuggling arms to Palestine and cars to Britain. This came to light (the following year, 1950) when Berneville-Claye gave evidence at the infamous trial of Donald Hume, who had murdered a car dealer, Stanley Setty. Meanwhile, having returned from Paris, Berneville-Claye married Margaret Murdoch. This was his second bigamous marriage, which did not last long, for his new wife caught him having sex with a farm girl (whether a child resulted from this liaison is unknown). Moreover, Margaret then also learnt that Berneville-Claye was still married to Irene. When Berneville-Claye was taken to court for his bigamous marriage to Margaret, this time he was sentenced to serve a custodial sentence at Pentonville Prison.

Having been released from Pentonville Prison, Berneville-Claye met and married Gisela Zimmer, this being his fourth marriage and, in the event, his final wife. They would have four children: Andrew, Peter Hedley, Colin Michael, and Susan Veronica. During this period, Berneville-Claye lived in some style, in a large manor-style house in Hertfordshire, playing the squire on horseback and riding to hounds, chairing village committees, and wearing his decorations at Remembrance Day parades. He could ill-afford this lavish lifestyle, and in the late 1950s he moved his family up to Yorkshire, where he secured a managerial position with Rank Xerox.

In 1957 he commenced an affair with a neighbour's wife, "Jenny" (a pseudonym). She became pregnant, and together they eloped to the Mediterranean. After Berneville-Claye had spent all her money, he deserted her and returned home to England, her marriage ended in divorce, and their baby was put up for adoption. This was Berneville-Claye's tenth child, only four of whom (those born to Gisela), he did not abandon along with their mothers. Following this scandal with "Jenny", Berneville-Claye was forced to leave Rank Xerox and lost his job. He became bankrupt, and, hounded by the debt recovery men, he decided to head for Australia.

=== Australia ===
Arriving in March 1959 and initially residing in Melbourne, where he first worked as a radio announcer, by 1964 Berneville-Claye and his family had moved to Australia's capital, Canberra, and endeavoured to reinvent himself but was unable to control his predilection for self-aggrandisement and exaggeration. Just three months after arriving in the capital, Berneville-Claye provided a wartime profile to The Canberra Times, which resulted in a published article billing him as 'One of the Top Five British Agents of World War II' who had won a Military Cross (and a bar) and the Croix de Guerre for gallantry. At this time, with his German-born wife Gisella, they had three sons and a daughter aged between six and twelve years of age. Meanwhile he continued to perpetuate the myth that he had been educated at Charterhouse and Oxbridge, and that he had retired in the rank of major from the SAS.

By August 1964 he had established the Slenderette Health and Beauty Studios, at Garema Place, Civic, Canberra, advertising to run finishing courses for young ladies and women, based on his 'experience as a BBC TV director, film director with the Rank Organisation and years of experience in the grooming of 'The Rank Starlets'.

By 1965, Berneville-Claye had become something of a political activist, and his letters featured frequently in The Canberra Times. He attended demonstration rallies, and attacked the government of the day regarding its Vietnam War policies. Then he overstepped the mark, by very publicly accusing the police of brutality in a letter to The Canberra Times. He next made the fateful error of writing to the police commissioner and signing himself off as a retired major, with the post-nominals of the Military Cross and Croix de Guerre. In the interim, the Australian Capital Territory police had done their homework and contacted police at Scotland Yard. ACT police took him to court, charged with falsely representing himself as entitled to wear gallantry medals. The paper also reported he had previously been court-martialled three times and cashiered from the British Army; that he had convictions for unlawfully wearing military emblems, several charges involving forged cheques, bigamy, stealing and fraudulent conversion. Berneville-Claye pleaded guilty, and with his reputation in tatters, departed the capital with his family.

=== Final years ===
Berneville-Claye moved with his family and secured a teaching appointment at St Gregory's College, Campbelltown, Sydney, New South Wales. Then, unexpectedly and following a two-week illness, he died of cancer on 26 June 1975. Following his death, a full and moving requiem mass was held for him at the college.

The college created a "Douglas Berneville-Claye Memorial Trophy", awarded for debating and public speaking. In 2008 Berneville-Claye's past again became clear when, following a newspaper article, the citizens of Campbelltown became aware of the full extent of his past, and the trophy discontinued

== Military service summary ==
Year(s)	Unit	Rank/role	Notes
1933–1933	Army Technical School	–	Based at Chepstow
1934–1936	16th/5th Queen's Royal Lancers	–	Based at York
1937–1938	12th Royal Lancers	–	–
1939–1940	Royal Air Force	Aircrew trainee	Based at Cardington, then Cambridge. Discharged.
1940	Home Guard	–	–
1941–	West Yorkshire Regiment (11th Battalion, then 2/5th Battalion)	Second lieutenant	Commenced officer training at Pwllheli and Sandhurst. Deployed to Egypt.
1942	Special Air Service	Promoted to lieutenant	Taken on strength with 1st SAS Regiment on 1 October 1942.
Dec 1942 – Mar 1945	Prisoner of war	–	POW camps in Italy and Germany. Collaboration dossier being compiled.
Apr 1945 – May 1945	British Free Corps (Nazi Germany)	SS-Hauptsturmführer (captain)	Met US forces, repatriated to England
1945–1946	Royal Army Service Corps (after reception unit and holding battalion temporary postings)	Lieutenant	Courts martial of April 1946 and September 1946. Cashiered out.

== See also ==
- British Free Corps
- List of members of the British Free Corps
- Roy Courlander (1914–1970), WW2 New Zealand soldier and British Free Corps SS Unit
- Military impostor
