= Edwin Barnard Martin =

Canadian Nazi collaborator

- Born: 11 February 1919; Riverside, Ontario, Canada
- Died: 16 August 1987 (aged 68); Ontario, Canada
- Military career
- Allegiance: Canada; Nazi Germany
- Units: Essex Scottish Regiment (?-1942); British Free Corps (1944)
- Conflicts: World War II: Dieppe Raid (POW)

Edwin Barnard Martin (11 February 1919 – 16 August 1987) was a Canadian member of the British Free Corps (BFC), a component of the armed forces of Nazi Germany, during the Second World War.

Martin was born in February 1919 and hailed from Riverside, Ontario. He was a private in the Canadian Essex Scottish Regiment, who had been captured during the Dieppe Raid in August 1942. In March 1944, he voluntarily left BFC for the isolation camp, by then situated near Schwerin in Mecklenburg.' The Canadian court-martial which heard his case after the war sentenced him to 25 years in prison for being an informer and a member of the British Free Corps. Around the same time, two other Canadian soldiers, John Gordon Galaher and George Hale, were sentenced to life in prison and 10 years, respectively, on similar charges. All three men were pardoned in 1954. Martin died in Ontario in August 1987 at the age of 68.

== See also ==
- British Free Corps
- List of members of the British Free Corps

== Bibliography ==
- West, Rebecca (1949). "Chapter III: The Children - Kenneth Edward and Stoker Rose - Section II - PP 288ff". The Meaning of Treason. London: Macmillan & Co Ltd.
