= Richard Landwehr =

German historian

Richard Landwehr is the author of numerous books about the Waffen-SS, particularly the foreign volunteers, providing controversial accounts of these men, their formations, and their battles. He has been producing the magazine Siegrunen on the same topic for over 30 years.

In his 1997 book 'Revolutionary Armies in the Modern Era: A Revisionist Approach' (described as "too flawed to be recommended as an undergraduate text"), historian S.P. MacKenzie describes Landwehr as an "extreme admirer [from] the fringes of the far-right." MacKenzie connects Landwehr with the contemporary Waffen-SS historical revisionism. Commenting on this trend, MacKenzie writes that "as older generation of Waffen-SS scribes has died off, a new, post-war cadre of writers has done much to perpetuate the image of the force as a revolutionary European army" and includes Landwehr in this group.

== Select works ==
- Narva, 1944: The Waffen-SS and the Battle for Europe ISBN 0-918184-02-9
- Budapest: The Stalingrad of the Waffen-SS ISBN 1-57638-129-3, ISBN 1-57638-128-5
- Nordic Warriors: SS-Panzergrenadier Regiment 24 Danmark, Eastern Front, 1943–45 with Holger Thor Nielsen ISBN 1-899765-07-7
- Estonian Vikings: Estnisches SS-Freiwilligen Bataillon Narwa, Eastern Front, 1943–1944 ISBN 1-899765-09-3
- Fighting for Freedom: The Ukrainian Volunteer Division of the Waffen-SS ISBN 0-918184-05-3
- Lions of Flanders: Flemish Volunteers of the Waffen-SS 1941–1945 with Ray Merriam ISBN 0-918184-04-5
- The Wallonien: The History of the 5th SS-Sturmbrigade and 28th SS Volunteer Panzergrenadier Division with Ray Merriam and Jean-Louis Roba ISBN 1-57638-088-2

== See also ==
- Waffen-SS in popular culture
- Franz Kurowski
- Gordon Williamson
