= William Brittain (British Free Corps) =

British Nazi collaborator

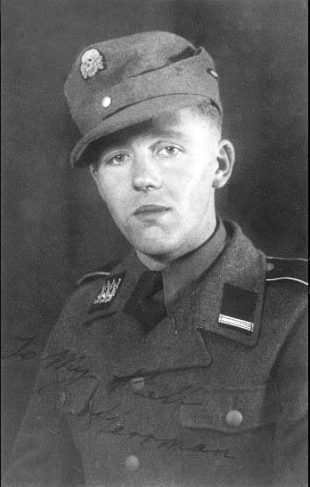
Brittain in February 1945

William Charles Brittain (known as 'Carl') was a lance-corporal of the Royal Warwickshire Regiment who was serving in No. 4 Commando at the time of his capture in Suda Bay, Crete, in June 1941. During the Second World War he became a member of the "staff" at the PoW "holiday camp" in Genshagen, Berlin in mid-1943 and later a Rottenführer in the Waffen-SS British Free Corps. In February 1945 while in Dresden, he said he "had long since lost his enthusiasm for the unit and was planning to escape". During a conversation with his girlfriend, a Norwegian nurse, he boasted of his plans and also claimed that he had foreknowledge of the bombing raids. Shocked by this, she denounced him almost immediately to the Gestapo and the BFC were arrested en masse. "[His] court-martial ... took place at Colchester in June 1946 and he received a ten-year sentence. Two months later he was found to be suffering from an incurable form of Crohn's disease and he was released.

== See also ==
- British Free Corps
- List of members of the British Free Corps
