= Roy Courlander =

New Zealander Nazi collaborator

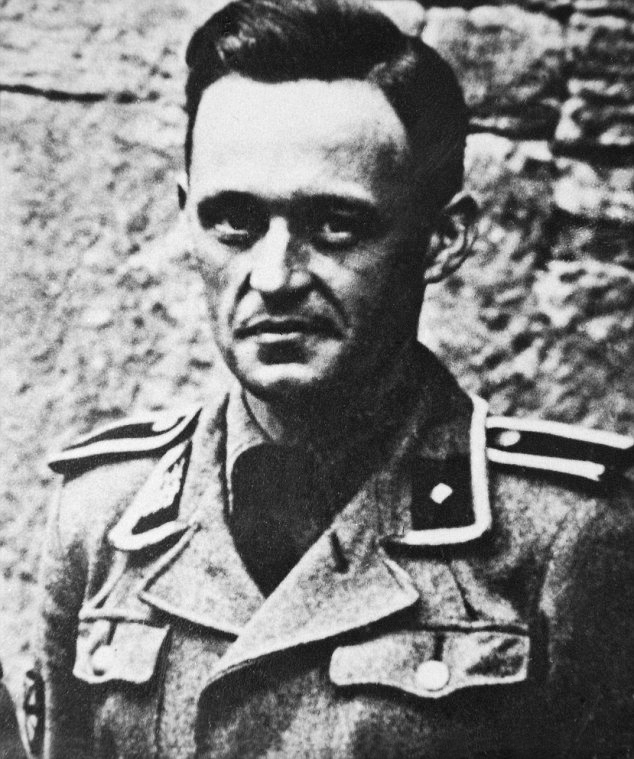
- Born: 6 December 1914; London, England
- Died: 1 June 1979 (aged 64); Lethbridge Park, New South Wales, Australia
- Military career
- Allegiance: New Zealand (to 1941); Germany (to 1944); Belgian Resistance (Alleged) (1944)
- Service years: 1939–1941; 1943–1944
- Nickname: Reg
- Unit: British Free Corps
- Conflicts: World War II; Western Desert Campaign; Battle of Greece

Roy Nicolas Courlander (6 December 1914 – 1 June 1979), nicknamed 'Reg', was a British-born New Zealand soldier who became an unterscharführer in the German Waffen-SS British Free Corps during the Second World War.

== Early life ==
It is indicated Courlander was born to an Irish mother Edith Cater (1898–1970) in December 1914, and a Russian or Lithuanian Jewish businessman Leonard Henry Courlander (1878–1970) as his father or step-father. (Note: The Dictionary of New Zealand Biography indicates he was born in London, and went to the New Hebrides from or after 1933. However an April 1929 Sydney Daily Telegraph newspaper article indicated he was born in New Hebrides and educated in England; and by this age of 15 had been 'twice around the world'. Courland is a region of Latvia, and historically, Latvia and Lithuania were under Russian control at various times.)

When he was 19, his parents divorced and he was sent to live and work on a coconut plantation owned by his father in the New Hebrides in the South Pacific. His mother married Frederick Bohne in 1933 and eventually moved to New Zealand in the 1950s where she died in 1970. His father remarried Gwendoline Elmes and moved to Sydney, Australia.

In November 1938, Courlander arrived in New Zealand and found work as a clerk with the Land and Income Tax Department in Wellington.

On 10 April 1939 he was arrested and convicted and sentenced to nine months imprisonment for breaking and entering a Napier house of Kathleen Reeston with John Matterson and Geoffrey Keen. Courlander and Keen's sentences were reduced on appeal to 18 months probation from 14 June 1939. Courlander held that his reason for going to the house was for a meal and that this was at Keen's invitation.

With early release, Courlander moved to Auckland on 30 September 1939 and married Joan Beryl Marchand there.

== Military life – Allies ==
=== New Zealand Army ===
On the outbreak of World War II in September 1939, Courlander was enlisted into the New Zealand Military Forces. Because of his knowledge of French and German he was placed in the Intelligence Corps. He sailed for Egypt on RMS Orion and served in Greece with the 18th Battalion. In December 1940 he was promoted to lance corporal. At Kalamata, Greece on 29 April 1941 he was captured and interned in Stalag XVIII-D at Maribor in Yugoslavia.

=== Prisoner-of-war ===
As a prisoner of war, Courlander acted as an interpreter at the camp. He joined work parties in Austria and eventually in September 1943 was sent to Genshagen camp (Stalag III-D/517) in Berlin. Courlander posed as a "White Russian émigré" and claimed to have extreme anti-Soviet views. He participated in Nazi broadcasts to the United Kingdom.

== Military life – Germans ==
Subsequently, the Germans recruited Courlander in January 1944 for the British Free Corps. He was one of the original six members. Although the name 'Leonard Courlander' appears in some records in connection with the British Free Corps, the actual member appears to be Roy Courlander. Along with Thomas Cooper, he is said to have forcibly recruited British and Dominion POWs for the British Free Corps. By April 1944 he was promoted to unterscharführer (sergeant). At his court martial, statements were made that Courlander was seeking to oust John Amery and take control of the Corps.

Courlander and another man, Francis Maton, left the BFC by volunteering for service with the war correspondent unit SS-Standarte Kurt Eggers, which was operating on the Western Front. Their ultimate goal was to make for the Allied lines at the first chance. Courlander and Maton removed all of the BFC insignia from their uniforms, replacing them with the standard SS patches and rank. The two men boarded a train for Brussels in the company of a Flemish Waffen-SS unit. On 3 September 1944, the two men arrived in Brussels, where they linked up with the Belgian Resistance. They participated in street fighting against the Germans, with Courlander being wounded during action. The following day, they gave themselves up to a British officer, thus becoming the first two BFC men to be arrested.

After his capture, Courlander was interviewed by British military intelligence, MI5. He told them Adolf Hitler had told BFC members that if Britain was defeated, the former King Edward VIII would replace George VI on the throne and Oswald Mosley would become the Prime Minister. Courlander also provided background information on the formation of the BFC.

== Court martial and imprisonment ==
Lance Corporal Courlander was arrested and tried by court martial on charges of treachery by the New Zealand military authorities in Westgate-on-Sea near Margate in Kent, England. On 3 October 1945, six years to the day after enlisting, he was sentenced to 15 years in prison on a charge of "voluntarily aiding the enemy".

Prosecuting officer Lieutenant-Colonel R. A. L. Hillard said that Courlander produced a series of propaganda talks designed to show how the British had failed to keep to pledges after the First World War and Trooper J. E. Wilson gave evidence that Courlander had told him he was trying to persuade the Germans to allow a corps of free British to fight the Russians. Courlander pleaded not guilty to the charge and stated that he had joined the BFC to facilitate escaping, but as that did not eventuate had sought to find a way to control and use the unit against the Germans.

In 1946, Courlander was transferred to Mount Eden Prison in Auckland. Because the court martial did not dismiss him from the military, Courlander was still entitled to wear his New Zealand Army uniform when out of prison for medical treatment, which he did in May 1946. His wife died in February 1949, having fought for a trial reopening due to "considerable evidence... which was not put before the court martial", while he was in prison. He appealed against his sentence, and in May 1950 it was reduced to nine years.

=== Release ===
Courlander was released on 2 October 1951, was discharged from the army, and married Margaret Spence the same day.

On his release from prison, Courlander sought to appear before the Royal New Zealand Returned and Services' Association which was rejected. The RSA had already protested against the change from fifteen to nine years and his early release after six. Any application to the New Zealand Ex-Prisoners of War Association was going to be refused. At this time, at least one former prisoner-of-war sought the court martial be reopened to give evidence in Courlander's defence, and there may have been a miscarriage of justice.

== Later life ==
Courlander obtained a job working for a business directory company and during the late 1950s was involved in the New Zealand Social Credit Political League. He moved to Australia during the 1960s to start a new life, divorcing his second wife in 1968. (Note: The order of the move and the divorce has not been established. They may have divorced (as she was later identified as being in New Zealand), and then he moved to Australia.) This was as a result of his heavy drinking. He ended up in a small industrial town of Lethbridge Park, near Sydney, which at the time was home to many serving and former soldiers and also another former SS soldier.

He died in Australia in 1979 at the age of 64.

Archives New Zealand holds a record entitled 'Biography of "Roy Courlander – Traitor" by G Carr under reference R20110377.

== See also ==
- British Free Corps
- List of members of the British Free Corps
- Douglas Berneville-Claye (1917–1975), English soldier Nazi collaborator, British Free Corps member, military imposter, who moved to Australia
