= Irish Republican Army (1922–1969) =

Anti-Treaty sub-group of the original IRA

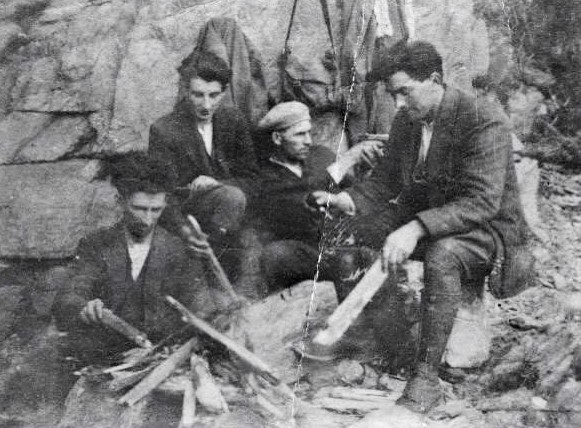
- An Anti-Treaty IRA unit in Old Parish, County Waterford, c. 1922.
- Leader: IRA Army Council
- Dates active: March 1922 – December 1969
- Allegiance: Irish Republic
- Active regions: Ireland; United Kingdom
- Ideology: Irish republicanism
- Wars: Irish Civil War and the Troubles

The Irish Republican Army (IRA; Irish: Óglaigh na hÉireann, lit. 'warriors of Ireland') was an Irish republican paramilitary organisation that carried on a number of violent campaigns between 1922 and 1969, in pursuit of a 32-county Irish republic. It arose from a split in the original IRA over the signing of the Anglo-Irish Treaty in December 1921, and was known during the ensuing Civil War as the Anti-Treaty IRA or the "Irregulars". It split in 1969 into the Provisional IRA and Official IRA.

The Civil War ended with anti-Treaty forces dumping arms, and over the following years, membership fell to fewer than 2,000. The IRA moved to the left in the early 1930s, under the leadership of Moss Twomey and later Seán MacBride. It swung to the right from 1938 under the leadership of Seán Russell; it had contact with the Abwehr, and Russell travelled to Nazi Germany, dying suddenly on the journey back to Ireland. From 1939 the IRA carried on the S-Plan, a bombing campaign in Britain which included the 1939 Coventry bombing, for which Peter Barnes and James McCormick were hanged. It also carried on the Northern campaign, a series of attacks on security forces in Northern Ireland. Internment without trial was introduced both in Northern Ireland and in the south, and IRA numbers were greatly reduced by the end of World War II. From 1958 to 1962 another series of attacks, called the Border campaign, were carried out, and again internment was introduced north and south.

The IRA moved to the left again in the 1960s, under the leadership of Cathal Goulding. It adopted a Marxist philosophy and advocated class-based, rather than sectarian, action. In 1969 it proposed to end abstentionism, allowing elected Sinn Féin members to take their seats in Dáil Éireann and the Northern Ireland Parliament. This, and the perceived failure of the IRA to protect Catholics during the 1969 Northern Ireland riots, led to the split at the 1969 IRA convention that resulted in the Official and Provisional IRA.

== Split over the Anglo-Irish Treaty ==
The original Irish Republican Army fought a guerrilla war against British rule in Ireland in the Irish War of Independence between 1919 and 1921. The Anglo-Irish Treaty signed on 6 December 1921 ended this war by granting most of the island a great degree of independence, but with six counties in the north staying within the United Kingdom as the new jurisdiction of Northern Ireland. The signing of the Anglo-Irish Treaty by the Irish delegation in London caused an angry reaction among the less compromising elements in Sinn Féin and among a majority of the IRA. The IRA units in the remaining 26 counties (that were to become the Irish Free State) split between supporters and opponents of the Treaty. The anti-Treatyites, referred to by Free State forces as "Irregulars", continued to use the name "Irish Republican Army" (IRA), as did the organisation in Northern Ireland, which originally supported the pro-Treaty side (if not the Treaty). The majority of headquarters staff, many of whom were close to Michael Collins, supported the Treaty, but opinion among IRA volunteers was divided. By and large, IRA units in Munster and most of Connacht were opposed to the Treaty, while those in favour predominated in the Midlands, Leinster and Ulster. The pro-Treaty volunteers formed the nucleus of the new National Army.

Anti-Treaty officers called an army convention in March 1922, attended by their supporters, which reaffirmed their opposition to the Treaty. They repudiated the authority of the Dáil, claiming that its members had broken their oath to defend the Irish Republic, and declared their own Army Executive to be the real government of the country until the Republic was formally established. The reasons why volunteers chose pro- and anti-Treaty positions are complex. One factor was an evaluation of the military situation. Whereas Collins, Richard Mulcahy and Eoin O'Duffy felt that the IRA could not continue to fight the British successfully, anti-Treaty officers such as Ernie O'Malley and Tom Barry felt that the IRA's position was stronger than it had ever been. Another factor was the role of powerful personalities; where the leader of an IRA unit—for example Sean McEoin, who sided with the Treaty in County Longford—took sides, often the remainder of his command joined him. The same was also true for anti-Treaty leaders such as Liam Lynch in Cork, whose First Southern Division supported him in opposing the treaty.

In March 1922, the Anti-Treaty IRA captured the Royal Navy vessel Upnor off the coast of Cobh, County Cork, which was carrying arms.

== Civil War ==
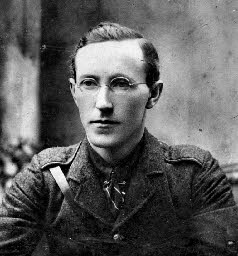
Liam Lynch was the first Chief of Staff of the Anti-Treaty IRA. He died during the Irish Civil War.

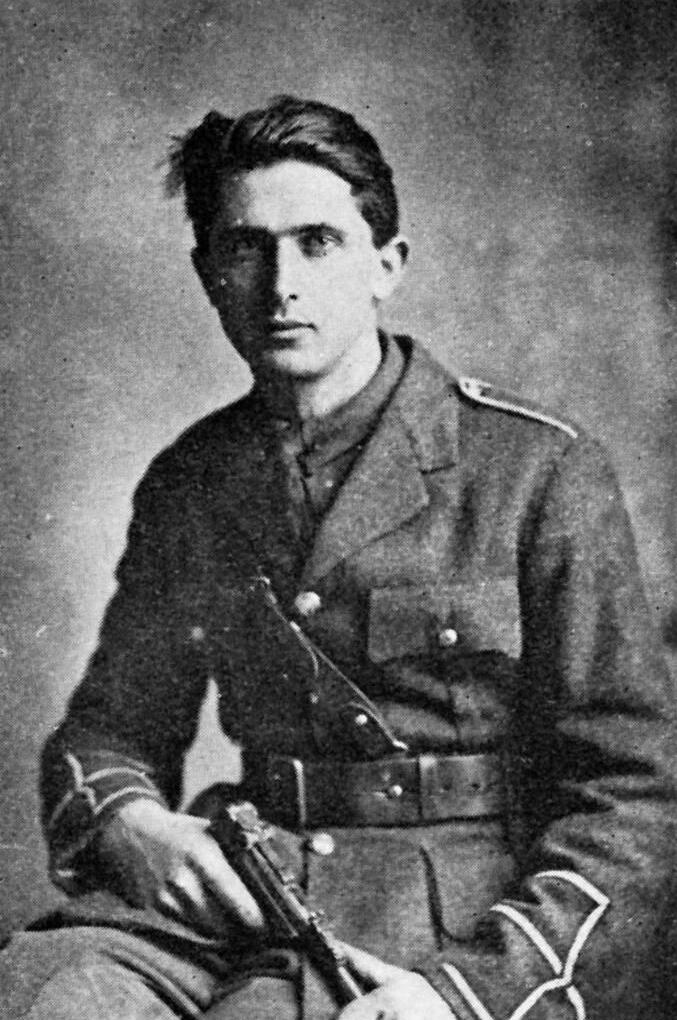
Mick Mansfield, Staff Engineer, Waterford Brigade, 1922.

On the outbreak of civil war in June 1922, the government of the Irish Free State issued directives to newspapers that its Army was to be called "The National Army", and that its opponents were to be called "Irregulars" and were not to be associated with the IRA of 1919–1921. This attitude hardened as the Civil War went on, and especially after the killing of Michael Collins in an ambush in August 1922. Collins wrote to W. T. Cosgrave on 25 July 1922 that those on the anti-Treaty side were "misguided, but practically all of them are sincere". However, the subsequent government attitude under Cosgrave was that the anti-Treaty side were rebels against the lawful government, and were not entitled to recognition as legitimate combatants. Some of the officers of the new Irish Army, led by Liam Tobin, formed an association called the "Old IRA" to distinguish themselves from the anti-Treaty fighters. Some pro-Treaty IRA officers, such as Eoin O'Duffy, alleged that the "Irregulars" had not fought the British in the War of Independence. O'Duffy claimed that the Kerry IRA's sole contribution in 1919–21 was "the shooting of an unfortunate soldier on the day of the truce". In Kerry's case—which saw more Royal Irish Constabulary men killed than anywhere else outside Dublin and Tipperary—this was far from true; however, some areas such as County Sligo and County Wexford did see considerably more action in the Civil War than in the War of Independence. Other IRA men such as Florence O'Donoghue formed a group called the "neutral IRA", which tried to reconcile the two factions.

Meanwhile, the IRA in Northern Ireland maintained its links with Michael Collins; but several Northern IRA leaders joined the anti-Treaty side – Belfast commander Joe McKelvey and Commandant General Charlie Daly (both were executed by Free State forces). The Northern IRA launched a renewed military offensive in May 1922, in which it was aided covertly by both the National Army and the anti-Treaty IRA. This scheme was interrupted by the outbreak of the Irish Civil War. Many Northern IRA men then had to flee the North in order to escape internment or worse at the hands of the Northern authorities. Over 500 of them ended up in the National Army during the civil war.

The IRA had been expanded hugely in 1922, from perhaps 15,000 men before the truce with the British in July 1921, to over 72,000 by November 1922. Veterans of the War of Independence derisively termed the new recruits "truceileers". These were to divide in broadly the same ratio as the veterans; however, most of them did not take part in the Irish Civil War. At the beginning of the Civil War, the Free State had about 8,000 fighters, mostly pro-Treaty IRA volunteers. The anti-Treaty side could muster about 15,000 men but it could not arm them all. At the start of the war, they had just under 7,000 rifles, a few machine guns and a handful of armoured cars taken from British garrisons (who were under orders not to fire on IRA units) as they evacuated the country. The remainder of anti-Treaty IRA arms were shotguns (3,000 of which were confiscated after the Civil War) and other civilian weapons.

Public support for the Treaty settlement and the new Irish Free State was reflected in the victory of the pro-Treaty side in general elections in 1922 and 1923. Anti-Treaty forces controversially seized a number of public buildings in Dublin in April 1922, most notably the Four Courts. Eventually, after two months and under British pressure, Michael Collins decided to remove them by force. Pro-Treaty forces bombarded the building, which surrendered after two days. Confused fighting raged for another five days, with anti-Treaty elements of the IRA's Dublin Brigade, under Oscar Traynor, occupying O'Connell Street until they were dislodged by artillery fire.

In July 1922, the anti-Treaty IRA units held most of the south and west of Ireland. However, the Republicans, under a new chief of staff, Liam Lynch, soon lost most of the territory they initially controlled. While the anti-Treaty side had a numerical advantage at the very start of the war, they were soon both outnumbered and outgunned. The Free State's National Army was quickly expanded to over 38,000 by the end of 1922 and to 55,000 men and 3,000 officers by the end of the war; one of its sources of recruits was Irish ex-servicemen from the British Army. Additionally, the British met its requests for arms, ammunition, armoured cars, artillery and aeroplanes. By August 1922, the Free State had re-taken all the major towns and territory held by republicans. The Free State's best troops were the Dublin Guard: a unit composed of former IRA men, mostly from the Dublin Brigade's active service unit who were to the forefront in the Free State's offensive of July–August 1922. They sided with the Free State primarily out of personal loyalty to Collins.

The anti-Treaty IRA was not equipped or trained to fight conventional warfare. Despite some determined resistance to the Free State advance south of Limerick by late August, most of them had dispersed to fight a guerrilla campaign.

The anti-Treaty guerrilla campaign was spasmodic and ineffective. Much of it was composed of the destruction of infrastructure such as the main railway bridge linking Cork with Dublin. They also burned many public buildings and "commandeered" supplies by force, alienating many civilians. Furthermore, without the public support that had existed during the War of Independence and facing an enemy who knew them and the countryside intimately, the anti-Treaty forces found that they could not sustain a guerrilla war such as that fought against Britain. Only in County Kerry was a relatively effective campaign fought, with the IRA units re-taking Kenmare and other towns from the Free State on several occasions. The IRA's relative popularity in this area had much to do with the brutality of the occupying Free State troops. Other areas of guerrilla activity included County Cork, western County Mayo, County Wexford and several other localities.

Despite the limitations of the anti-Treaty IRA's campaign, they still inflicted more fatalities on Free State troops (about 800) in the eleven-month civil war than they had on British Crown forces, who lost about 600 killed in the almost three-year-long War of Independence (1919–1921). The disparity is possibly due to the Free State troops' relative paucity of training and equipment compared with British forces.

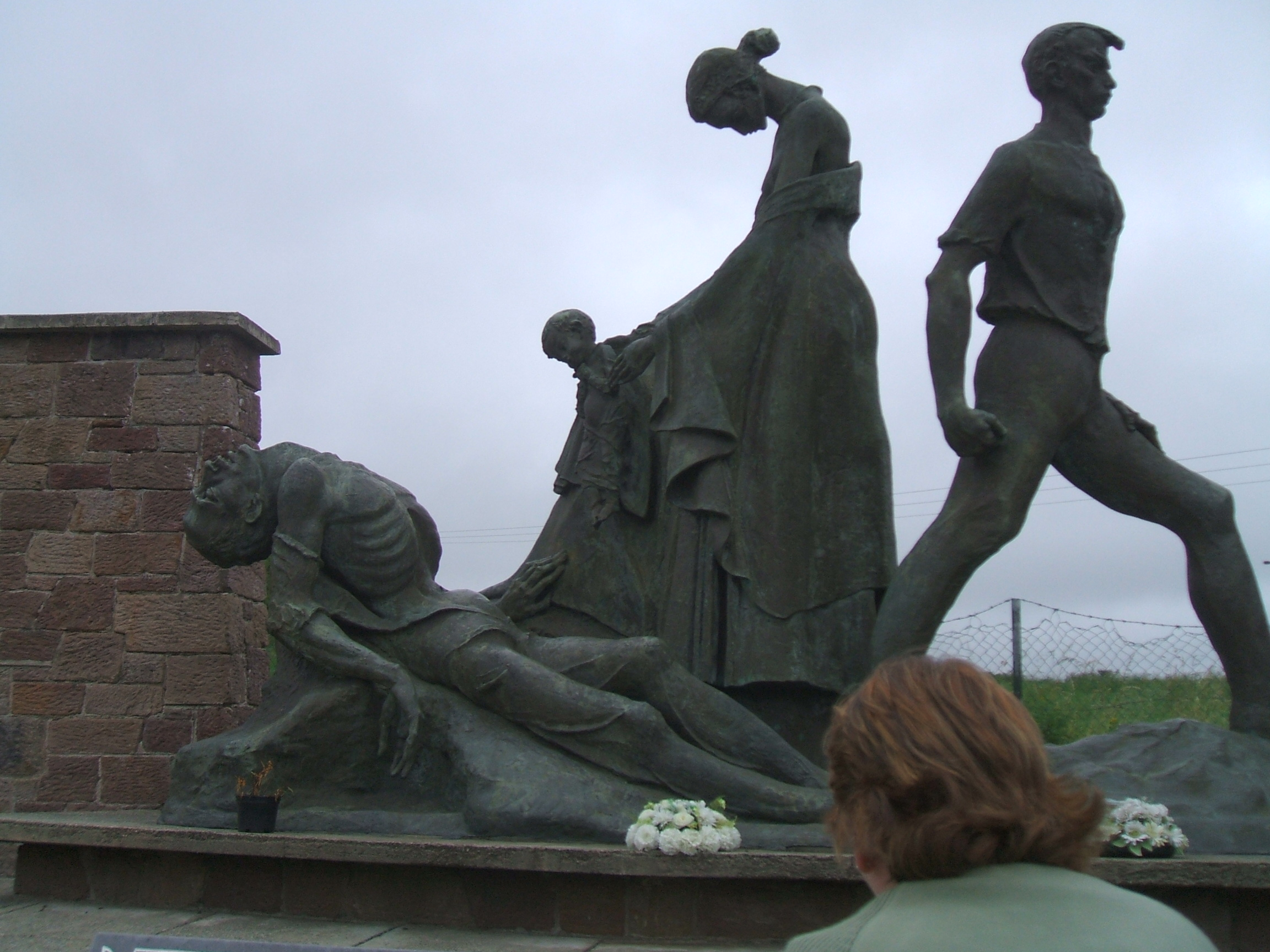
Memorial to anti-Treaty insurgents executed by Free State forces at Ballyseedy, County Kerry, designed by Yann Goulet.

The conduct of the Civil War resulted in long-lasting bitterness on both sides. In September special emergency legislation came into effect under which military tribunals were empowered to pass death sentences. The head of the anti-Treaty forces, Liam Lynch, responded with an announcement that Free State TDs and Senators who had voted for the legislation would be targeted. A number of members of the Oireachtas were attacked, TD Seán Hales was killed and the property of parliamentarians burnt. The day following the killing of Hales, in reprisal the government cabinet ordered the execution of four imprisoned leaders of the anti-treaty IRA: Joe McKelvey, Rory O'Connor, Liam Mellows and Richard Barrett were executed by firing squad (8 December 1922). In addition, IRA men around the country burned many of the stately homes of the old Protestant Anglo-Irish landed class—a policy motivated by both class antagonism and nationalist resentment against a class traditionally seen as "pro-British". The Free State Government, for its part, officially executed 77 anti-Treaty prisoners. Government forces also carried out a number of atrocities against prisoners. This was particularly pronounced in Kerry, where the fighting was most bitter. On at least three occasions in March 1923, IRA prisoners were massacred with land mines in reprisal for the killing of Free State soldiers. Ironically, the men accused of these war crimes were mostly from the Dublin Guard, themselves IRA veterans from 1919 to 1921.

By 1923, the defeat of the anti-Treaty IRA seemed assured. It controlled no territory and its guerrilla campaign had little public support. The civil war petered out in mid-1923 after the death in action of IRA chief-of-staff Liam Lynch. Shortly afterward, on 24 May 1923, the anti-Treaty forces received an order, issued by Frank Aiken, their chief-of-staff, to "dump arms". Éamon de Valera supported this in his speech "Legion of the Rearguard":

In de Valera's words, "Further sacrifice of life would now be vain and continuance of the struggle in arms unwise in the national interest and prejudicial to the future of our cause. Military victory must be allowed to rest for the moment with those who have destroyed the Republic. Other means must be sought to safeguard the nation's right."

By this time, thousands of republicans were already prisoners of the Free State government led by W. T. Cosgrave; many more were arrested after they dumped arms and returned to civilian life. By late 1923, over 12,000 anti-Treaty IRA men were interned. The prisoners were released over the following year, with Éamon de Valera the last to leave Kilmainham Gaol in 1924.

In 1924 the IRA counted 14,500 members in total, including young men aged from 19 upwards, but with just over 5,000 weapons in its dumps. By 1926 the number of members had shrunk to 5,042. By 1930 the IRA possessed fewer than 2,000 members and only 859 rifles, indicating the decline in its military potential. The casualties of the anti-Treaty IRA in the Civil War have never been accurately counted, but are thought to have been considerably more than the 800 or so deaths suffered by the Free State Army, perhaps two or three times as numerous. Significantly however, the war had not been brought to an end by any kind of agreement between the two sides. The IRA of the post-Civil War era would never accept the Free State as a legitimate Irish government and would continue to oppose its existence.

== Post-Civil War ==
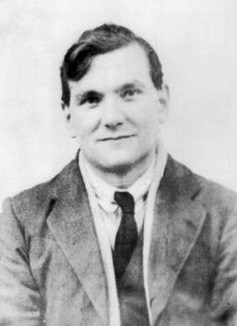
Moss Twomey was Chief of Staff, 1926–36. IRA-Soviet relations began a year earlier with Felix Dzerzhinsky's OGPU.

The period immediately following the Irish Civil War saw the IRA swing towards the political left, manifest in the election of Moss Twomey to the position of chief of staff. Twomey would go on to hold the position for almost a decade and became the longest-lasting Chief of Staff of this iteration of the IRA. Under his reign, he cautiously opened the IRA up to left-wing influences in order to contrast it against the emerging right-wing stance of the Cumann na nGaedheal government.

In summer of 1925, the anti-treaty IRA had sent a delegation led by Pa Murray to the Soviet Union for a personal meeting with Joseph Stalin, in the hopes of gaining Soviet finance and weaponry. A secret pact was agreed, whereby the IRA would spy on the United States and the United Kingdom and pass information to Red Army military intelligence in New York City and London in return for £500 a month. The pact was originally approved by Frank Aiken, who left soon after to co-found Fianna Fáil with De Valera, before being succeeded by Andrew Cooney and Moss Twomey, who kept up the secret IRA-Soviet espionage relationship until around 1930–1931.

While Twomey was not an ideological Marxist–Leninist (although there were some communists in the IRA at this time, such as Peadar O'Donnell), he saw the arrangement as purely utilitarian and regarded the Soviets as "shifty" and "out to exploit us." Some republicans argued that they had lost the Civil War because they had not appealed to the social unrest in the country and had lacked any social or economic programme, which allowed communists to gain influence. Nevertheless, the IRA passed specifications of British "submarine detection sonar and aeroplane engines for bombers, military journals and manuals, and gas masks" to the Soviets and the IRA's man in the U.S., "Mr. Jones", passed "reports of the army's chemical weapons service, state-of-the-art gas masks, machine-gun and aeroplane engine specifications, and reports from the navy, air service and army" to Red Army intelligence.

In 1926, after failing to persuade Sinn Féin to participate in the political institutions of the Free State, de Valera formed a new political party, called Fianna Fáil, and many Sinn Féin members left to support him. De Valera would in 1932 become President of the Executive Council, at the head of the first Fianna Fáil government.

Also in 1926, the IRA launched a campaign in Dublin to rid the city of moneylenders. It employed largely antisemitic rhetoric, with a large number of the known moneylenders raided being Jews.

The IRA considered itself to be upholding the Republic that was declared in the 1916 Proclamation and held that the government of the Irish Free State was illegitimate. It maintained that it remained the army of that Republic, in direct continuity with the IRA of the War of Independence period. There were several competing organisations on the radical republican side of Irish politics during this period. In addition to the IRA, these included the hard-line elements of anti-Treaty Sinn Féin, such as Mary MacSwiney, who had not followed de Valera into constitutional politics, and the rump of the anti-Treaty members of the Second Dáil, still proclaiming themselves the only legitimate Irish parliament. For most of this period, the IRA's relations with Sinn Féin were poor (IRA members were even forbidden to join the party), despite the reconciliation attempt represented by the 1929 Comhairle na Poblachta.

The IRA intervened in a number of strikes during this period, and IRA members campaigned against the payment of land annuities (in respect of the buying-out of landlords by the former British administration), with Peadar O'Donnell establishing the Anti-Tribute League in 1928. Many Communist Party of Ireland members were also members of the IRA at this time. Political initiatives such as Saor Éire, begun in 1931, were promoted by left-wing IRA members such as George Gilmore, Peadar O'Donnell and Frank Ryan. IRA members also helped establish the "Friends of Soviet Russia", from which they later expelled Communist Party members when relations between the two organisations deteriorated.

In the years after the Civil War, many republicans viewed the Free State, with its censorship of newspapers and extensive coercive legislation, as a sham democracy, in the service of British imperialism. The IRA remained prepared to take over the country by insurrection, after which it expected to have to fight the British again. In November 1926 it seized 11 Garda Síochána barracks, shooting dead two Gardaí. The Free State immediately used its Special Powers Act to intern 110 IRA men the next day. IRA men assassinated Free State minister Kevin O'Higgins in 1927 in revenge for his perceived responsibility for executions in the Civil War. A total of four Gardaí were killed by the IRA in the period 1926–1936. In 1932 Gardaí shot and wounded two IRA leaders, George Gilmore and Thomas Ryan, in Kilrush, County Clare.

=== Fianna Fáil in government ===
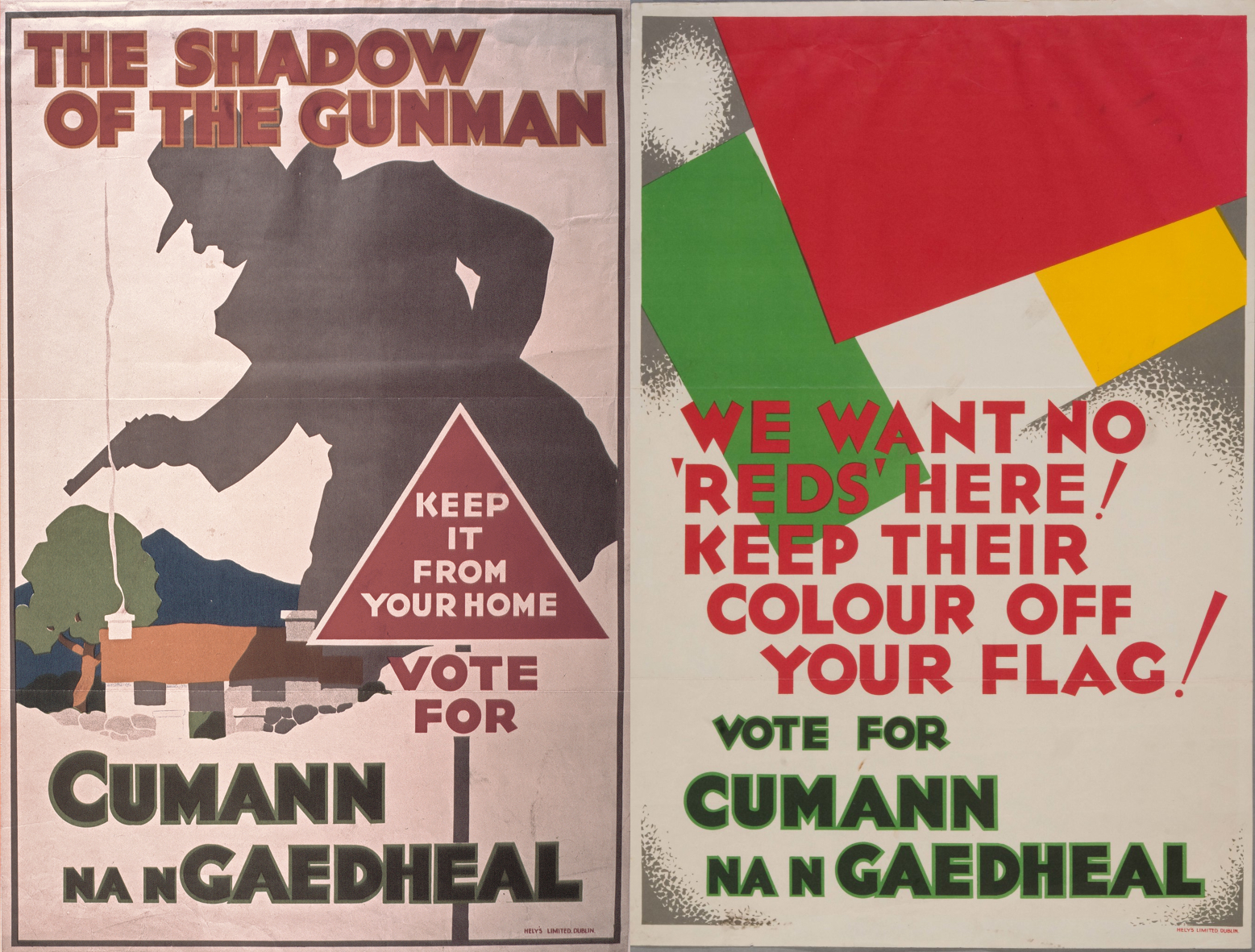
During the 1932 election Cumann na nGaedheal attempted to use red scare tactics by linking Sinn Féin to the IRA, and the IRA to Communism.

When de Valera's Fianna Fáil party won the 1932 election, the IRA expected the Free State party Cumann na nGaedheal not to respect the result and prepared for another civil war. To their surprise, Cosgrave's party peacefully gave up power and instructed the police and armed forces to obey the new government.

In the first two years of Fianna Fáil government, the IRA's membership grew from a low of 1,800 to over 10,000. This can be put down to the radicalising impact of the Great Depression on the population, to which the IRA's new social radicalism (see next section) appealed. Another important factor was the formation of the Blueshirts: a quasi-fascist organisation set up by Eoin O'Duffy, originally composed of Civil war veterans of the Free State Army. The IRA and the Blueshirts both attacked political meetings and also fought street brawls against each other. While most of the fighting was conducted with fists or boots, at least one Blueshirt and one IRA man were shot dead in these clashes. IRA leaders saw in these events the beginnings of a republican revolution and the overthrow of the Free State. They were to be disappointed.

Initially, de Valera's Fianna Fáil government was friendly towards the IRA, legalising the organisation and freeing all their prisoners who had been interned by Cumann na nGaedhael. This afforded the IRA a quasi-legal status that meant Gardaí were unwilling to act against them for fear of repercussions. On his victory tour, de Valera snubbed a Garda guard of honour in Skibbereen, but saluted the IRA one. By 1935 this relationship had turned to enmity on both sides. The IRA accused Fianna Fáil of "selling out" by not declaring a republic and by tolerating the continued partition of Ireland. De Valera banned the IRA in 1936, after they murdered a landlord's agent, Richard More O'Farrell, in a land dispute and fired shots at police during a strike of Dublin tramways workers, on top of their bank robberies. However, most of the IRA's republican constituency were reconciled to the Free State by de Valera's government, which introduced a republican constitution in 1937, abolishing the Oath of Allegiance to the British monarchy and introducing an elected president as head of state. The document also included a territorial claim to Northern Ireland. By the late 1930s at the latest, most Irish people disagreed with the residual Irish Republican Army's claims that it remained the legitimate 'army of the Republic'.

In Northern Ireland, the IRA's main role was to try to defend the Catholic community during outbreaks of sectarian rioting. For this reason Peadar O'Donnell, a left-wing IRA leader who was opposed to the Catholic nationalism of many IRA members, said disparagingly that "we don't have an IRA battalion in Belfast, we have a battalion of armed Catholics".

This burst of what has sometimes been termed "social republicanism" expired in the mid-1930s. In 1931 Saor Éire had quickly collapsed due to the combination of fierce reaction from the Catholic Church, deeply hostile to anything that appeared communist, and repressive legislation immediately introduced by the government. Left-wing IRA members, including Peadar O'Donnell, Frank Ryan and George Gilmore, frustrated with the failure of the IRA to achieve either "The Republic" or socialist revolution, left in 1934 to set up a new party, the Republican Congress. This, in turn, was ultimately a failure, partly because conservative elements in the IRA leadership opposed it and forced its supporters to leave the organisation. The Congress itself also split and collapsed after its first general meeting in 1935.

In 1936–37, a number of ex-IRA men were among the Irish fighters (later to become known as the Connolly Column) who joined the largely socialist International Brigades to fight for the Second Spanish Republic against the Nationalists during the Spanish Civil War. The IRA did not show any support for the Spanish Republic and subsequently banned members for joining the Connolly Column. Frank Ryan was perhaps the most prominent Irish participant. (At the same time, IRA opponent and Greenshirts leader Eoin O'Duffy organised the Irish Brigade to go to Spain to fight on the opposing side, with Francisco Franco's Nationalists.)

The IRA was banned once again in 1935, as were the Blueshirts. Moss Twomey was imprisoned and was succeeded as chief of staff by Seán MacBride. De Valera's government increasingly followed a strict anti-IRA policy. In 1936 Vice-Admiral Henry Somerville was assassinated in his West Cork home by IRA gunmen for recruiting many local Irishmen (including IRA members and even a captain in the Drimoleague company) into the British military—which combined with other members immigrating to the UK for work had a notable effect on IRA manpower. The Gardaí described the assassination as "a well and coolly thought-out outrage, well-planned and daringly executed".

== Seán Russell's rise to Chief of Staff ==
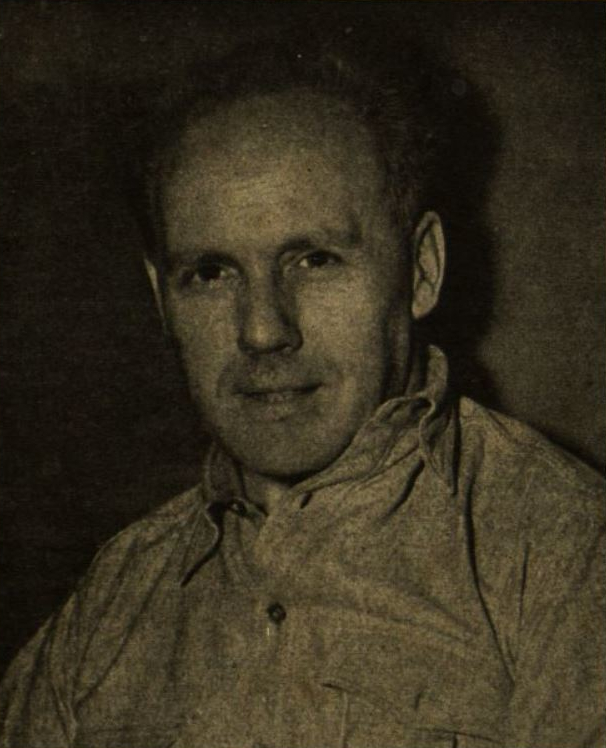
Under Sean Russell's leadership, the IRA once again sought war with Britain

Seán MacBride was disliked by many members of the IRA who were distrustful of his inclination toward politics, and he soon came in to open conflict with the IRA's Quartermaster-General, Seán Russell, who prepared a bombing campaign in England in spite of MacBride's disapproval. MacBride had Russell court-martialed for misappropriating IRA funds, resulting in the latter's demotion within the organisation.

When the next army convention was called, MacBride was ousted and Tom Barry elected Chief of Staff. Barry began preparations for a large-scale invasion of Northern Ireland, establishing camps where hundreds of IRA men were trained, creating detailed maps containing the locations of army and police barracks, and importing Thompsons with the help of Clan na Gael. However, the plan was cancelled just days before it was scheduled to be executed as a result of revelations that the plans had been leaked, becoming common knowledge in Dublin, and that the Belfast Brigade had been infiltrated by the Royal Ulster Constabulary (RUC). Afterwards, Tom Barry resigned as Chief of Staff, being succeeded by Mick Fitzpatrick.

Seán Russell left Ireland for the United States without permission from the IRA leadership, meeting Joseph McGarrity of Clan na Gael, who pledged monetary support to Russell's cause, while in Ireland, his supporters Peadar O'Flaherty and Tom McGill travelled the country, sounding out support for Russell, and had the IRA's commanding officer in England replaced by Jimmy Joe Reynolds, who favoured a bombing campaign.

Growing frustration by younger members of the IRA at the organisation's inactivity under Fitzpatrick's leadership led to Seán Russell's election as Chief of Staff at a General Army Convention of the IRA in April 1938, in spite of Barry's protests against the idea of a bombing campaign and Russell himself being forbidden to attend the convention. Barry and many leading members of the IRA opposed to the campaign subsequently resigned.

Russell's tenure as Chief of Staff would signal both a tactical and ideological departure from the Twomey, MacBride and Barry period. Russell eschewed the left-wing tendencies of the 1920s and 30s IRA and pushed for a more "militarist" approach.

One of the first major moves by Russell was to shore up the political credibility of the IRA. As Chief of Staff, he was able to secure a powerful symbolic gesture from the "rump" of the Second Dáil, that is to say, elected members of the Second Dáil who remained Republicans. 7 of these former TDs transferred what authority they believed they had as representatives of the Second Dáil to the IRA army council, thus, in their minds, rendering it the legitimate governing body of Ireland. The IRA felt this move gave them the authority to formally declare war on the United Kingdom, which they would almost immediately do.

=== Ideological shift ===
The IRA that emerged from the debacle of the Republican Congress would be inspired primarily by a conservative, strictly nationalist political outlook and was increasingly influenced by radical right-wing ideas based on Catholic social teaching such as corporatism, distributism and even the fascist ideology of Ailtirí na hAiséirghe, which sent books, journals and posters to IRA internees imprisoned in the Curragh. Tarlach Ó hUid, the editor of the IRA newspaper War News, and Gearóid Ó Broin, a member of the IRA Army Council, became members of Ailtirí na hAiséirghe, and the IRA Adjutant-General, Tomás Ó Dubhghaill, expressed his approval of the party in a letter to its leader Gearóid Ó Cuinneagáin.

Anti-Semitic sentiments also began to be expressed, including satisfaction at the 'cleansing fires' of the Wehrmacht driving the Jews out of Europe, and accusations towards the Irish government of being dominated by "Jews and Freemasons". Seamus O'Donovan denounced Britain and the United States as being "centres of Freemasonry, international financial control and Jewry". In 1939 O'Donovan became increasingly enamoured of Nazi ideology and visited Germany three times 'to discuss potential agents, the supply of arms in the event of war, [and to collect] radio sets and courier communication.' In 1942 he wrote an article arguing that Ireland's future lay in an alliance with a victorious Germany.

The IRA began to reconcile with their erstwhile opponent Eoin O'Duffy, who met in the summer of 1939 with several IRA figures and Eduard Hempel. A year later, IRA officers approached O'Duffy and asked him to join the organisation. While O'Duffy did not take up the offer, he was later invited to join Moss Twomey and Andrew Cooney in protesting the basing of American troops in Northern Ireland.

In 1940, prominent members and supporters of the IRA established Córas na Poblachta, which, among its objectives, called for the "destruction of the Masonic Order in Ireland" and the "reversal of the cultural conquest of our country by England", not excluding "the employment of compulsion" to that end. Many far-right figures joined the party, including Ó Cuinneagáin, who lead the party's youth wing, Aicéin, until its independence was terminated in 1942, while Córas na Poblachta took on a strongly anti-Semitic and pro-German character.

The IRA's ideological shift was noted by other organisations at the time. In 1940, the Communist Party of Ireland, which had been close to the IRA in the 1930s, published an article in its official newspaper for Northern Ireland The Red Hand that openly questioned if the IRA had become a pro-fascist group. Similarly, in September 1939 upon the outbreak of World War II, socialist republican and former IRA Army council member George Gilmore wrote an appeal pleading with the IRA to dump arms until the war in Europe was over and denounced them for flirting with fascism by seeking aid from Germany.

== World War II ==
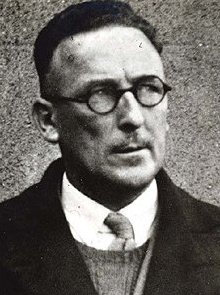
Seamus O'Donovan was a key figure in organising the S-Plan in 1939–40. He collaborated with the Abwehr.

In January 1939, as the United Kingdom prepared for a possible war with Germany, the IRA Army Council declared war on the UK. The IRA Sabotage Campaign or "S-Plan" began a few days later. Under it, IRA operatives based in Britain attacked infrastructure, with a view to weakening the UK's war effort.

Following the German invasion of Poland, the Irish government declared its neutrality on 2 September, along with a state of emergency for the duration of hostilities between the Allies and Germany.

On 23 December 1939, IRA members stole almost the entire reserve ammunition store of the Irish Army from the Magazine Fort in Dublin's Phoenix Park. This became known as the "Christmas Raid" in IRA folklore. The RUC found two and a half tons of the stolen ammunition inside County Armagh on 2 January 1940. The next day the Irish Minister for Justice, Gerald Boland, at an emergency session of the Dáil, introduced the Emergency Powers Bill to reinstate internment, Military Tribunal, and executions for IRA members. It was rushed through and given its third reading the next day creating the Emergency Powers Act. It was later used to execute at least six IRA volunteers in Ireland between 1940 and 1944. Peter Barnes and James McCormick, who had been arrested in England shortly following an IRA bomb that exploded in Coventry on 25 August 1939 (see 1939 Coventry bombing), resulting in the deaths of several uninvolved English civilians, were executed on 7 February 1940. Republican publication An Phoblacht did not deny their mission in England and IRA membership but maintains that they were not involved with the Coventry bombing.

In July 1940 the IRA issued an open letter stating that if "German forces should land in Ireland, they will land...as friends and liberators of the Irish people". Readers were informed that Germany desired neither "territory nor...economic penetration" in Ireland but simply wanted Ireland to play its part in the "reconstruction" of a "free and progressive Europe". The Third Reich was also praised as the "energising force" of European politics and the "guardian" of national freedom. When George Bernard Shaw retorted that the Nazis were anti-Catholic, the IRA responded that Hitler's and Mussolini's support of Franco in Spain proved their pro-Catholic credentials.

By 1941, the IRA numbered fewer than 1,000 members, many of whom were imprisoned. Most of its able political organisers had left in the mid- to late-1930s and its "natural constituency" had been appropriated by Fianna Fáil.

During the Second World War, the IRA hoped for support from Germany to strike against Britain. Seán Russell travelled to Germany in 1940 to canvass for arms. He became ill and died on board a German U-boat which was bringing him back to Ireland in August that year along with Frank Ryan (see Operation Dove). Stephen Hayes, the acting Chief of Staff, prepared an invasion plan for Northern Ireland and sent it to German Intelligence in 1940; this plan was later called Plan Kathleen, but it was discovered by the Irish authorities within one month of its creation. The Irish Government opposed the IRA's collaboration with Nazi Germany, having adopted a position of neutrality.

Günther Schütz, a member of the Abwehr (German military intelligence), parachuted into Ireland and was almost immediately arrested. On 28 February 1942 he escaped. The IRA intended to send him back to Germany with a request for weapons, ammunition, explosives, radio equipment and money. The IRA Army Executive met on 20 April and sanctioned the request. They also approved a plan to "give military information to powers at war with England even before any definite contacts [were] established with these powers", provided the information did not endanger civilians. The plan was quickly discovered when an IRA courier was arrested on the Dublin-Belfast train with documentation of the decisions taken, and details of the Nazi contact. This led to the arrest of Schuetz, on 30 April, only hours before he was due to set sail. The boat was seized and the crew arrested.

In Belfast, much to the alarm of the Northern Ireland authorities, the city's brigade had developed a "Protestant squad", an intelligence unit, largely recruited by John Graham, a Church of Ireland devout, from Denis Ireland's Ulster Union Club. But while Graham, who opposed cooperation with the Germans, and others in the Belfast command continued to debate the merits of a new northern campaign, in April 1942 a diversionary action, intended to draw the RUC from an illegal 1916 commemoration, developed into a street gun battle. A police constable, father of four Thomas James Forbes, was killed, in consequence of which six of the eight members of the active unit were sentenced to death. In the event all but one were reprieved. On 2 September 1942 Tom Williams, nineteen, was hanged, becoming the first and only Irish Republican to be judicially executed in the North.

It has been rumoured that during the war period IRA members may have attempted to provide intelligence to assist the German aerial bombing of industrial targets in Northern Ireland. However, information recovered from Germany after the war showed that the planning of raids such as the Belfast Blitz was based exclusively on the aerial reconnaissance of the Luftwaffe.

The IRA was severely damaged by the measures taken against it by the governments on both sides of the border during the Second World War. IRA members were interned both north and south of the border, and a number of IRA men, including the chief of staff between 1942 and 1944, Charlie Kerins, were executed by the Irish government for criminal offences committed during the war. Kerins had been tried and found guilty of the murder of a local police officer (Garda).

== Post-World War II ==
Following World War II, the IRA still existed but its numbers had been severely depleted. Some IRA units remained in the Irish countryside; however, they were cut off from any sort of command structure and bitterly demoralised. Out of touch with Dublin, and with other units, IRA members became fewer and fewer. In 1945, one of the first attempts was made to create a centre in Dublin. The meeting consisted of Sean Ashe, Micksy Conway, Tony Magan, Willie McGuinness, Bertie McCormack and a few others. They did not know who else would help, nor who had been in the Army. The problems were evident but no one had ready answers. The loss of all the GHQ staff and their records had left Dublin as isolated from the country as the country was from Dublin. Even though there was a lack of information and manpower, the obvious first step was to get some sort of unit going in Dublin. The next step was to resurrect the Army Executive and through it, the legitimate structure of the IRA. One of the first acts of the re-formed IRA was to call a "ceasefire" with the United Kingdom on 10 March 1945. It was a declaration met with indifference at best and bemusement at worst by most of the world, who at this point considered the IRA a dead organisation.

The organisation that re-emerged after the war was ideologically depleted as well as numerically so. According to a thesis by David Browne, ideological disputes among republican prisoners interned together in the Curragh during the war had already seen the veteran communist Michael O'Riordan leave the IRA, taking with him many of its remaining socialist and communist-inclined activists. This left a vacuum which was filled, in the years immediately after the war, by a new leadership drawn largely from among the remaining Curragh internees who had themselves opposed the communist faction during internment, and who would steer the organisation towards a firmly anti-communist, traditionalist form of republicanism.

=== Clann na Poblachta ===
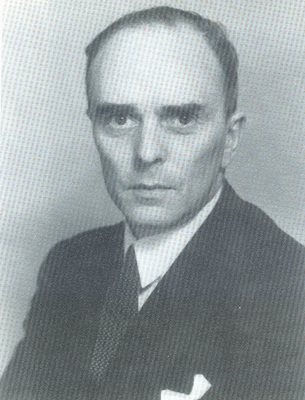
Former Chief of Staff Sean MacBride formed a new political party in 1947 called Clann na Poblachta. Many of the members were also former IRA members who held left wing views

In 1946, a new political party called Clann na Poblachta was formed in Ireland by former Chief of Staff Sean MacBride. Several of the leading members were also former left-wing IRA members and the party itself espoused itself as Republican. However, many of the militarists left within the IRA were not eager to support any political party which recognised the legitimacy of Dáil Éireann, and indeed, the IRA banned its members from joining the Clann on the basis that they were not going to be an abstentionist party. Nonetheless, they watched with curiosity as to how this party would fare. At first, hopes for Clann na Poblachta were high, with some believing it would challenge Fianna Fáil in the Dáil. However, shrewd electioneering by De Valera meant that the Clann did not become the great power they had hoped to be. They did, however, manage to enter government in 1948 as part of the coalition which made up the Government of the 13th Dáil. Unfortunately for the Clann, that government's run proved to be somewhat disastrous and permanently dented their support. In each subsequent election, the Clann received less and less support until it dissolved as a party in 1965.

The failure of Clann na Poblachta reinforced the IRA's doubts about the ability of left-wing political parties to wrestle power out of the hands of Fianna Fáil and Fine Gael and helped spur the IRA towards traditionalism in the 1950s. However, their initial success did help convince the IRA they would have to marry their military tactics with political tactics.

=== Rapprochement with Sinn Féin ===
In 1947 the IRA held its first Army Convention since World War II, and a new leadership was elected, primarily consisting of the "three Macs", Tony Magan, Paddy McLogan, and Tomás Óg Mac Curtain. The "three Macs" believed that a political organisation was necessary to help rebuild the IRA. IRA members were instructed to join Sinn Féin en masse, and despite the IRA's small numbers following WW2, they were successfully able to fully take over the organisation. This coup d'état of Sinn Féin was made possible due to the weak state of Sinn Féin itself; the party had become a shell of its former self in the decades following Éamon de Valera taking the bulk of the membership with him when he split to form Fianna Fáil in 1926. Paddy McLogan was named Sinn Féin president in 1950, with fellow IRA member Tomás Ó Dubhghaill named vice-president, signalling the IRA's complete control of the party's apparatus.

A further General Army Convention, held in September 1948, formalised this new leadership structure, electing Tony Magan as Chief of Staff, with McLogan and Mac Curtain assuming further senior positions on a newly constituted Army Council charged with directing both military and political strategy. The convention also decided that attacks on security forces within the Republic of Ireland were counter-productive, sanctioning instead a future military campaign confined to Northern Ireland, while Sinn Féin was to be used chiefly for propaganda, recruitment, and the promulgation of the republican movement's ideology. Links between the IRA and Sinn Féin, restored that same year, were intended by the new leadership to make the party primarily a political front for the Army Council rather than an independent electoral vehicle.

=== Ideology of the post-World War II IRA ===
Under the new leadership, the republican movement developed a position that fused separatist nationalism with Catholic social teaching and a firmly anti-communist outlook. The pursuit of a thirty-two county Republic was presented by the movement not as an end in itself but as the first step in a wider project, also intended to address the economy, emigration and living standards, which Sinn Féin and the IRA described as "undoing the conquest" rather than merely removing the border.

The movement's economic and social policy, articulated chiefly through its newspaper the United Irishman and through Sinn Féin's election manifestos, drew on the papal encyclicals Rerum Novarum (1891), issued by Pope Leo XIII, and Quadragesimo Anno (1931), issued by Pope Pius XI, both of which emphasised workers' dignity and fair wages while explicitly rejecting socialism. Specific policies advocated by Sinn Féin in this period included reform of the monetary system to bring banking under national control, the curtailment of investment by foreign-owned banks, and Irish ownership of natural resources.

The new leadership, many of whom were former Curragh internees who had opposed the communist faction during internment, was also emphatically anti-communist, a position that was both a matter of conviction and a calculated response to the widespread "red scare" and clerical disapproval of communism in Irish society during the early Cold War. The United Irishman maintained a consistent anti-communist editorial line from 1948 until the end of the border campaign in 1962, while simultaneously presenting the movement as a supporter of small nations resisting both Western imperialism and Soviet communism; the IRA offered solidarity to anti-colonial movements in Cyprus, Algeria and Kenya, as well as to those resisting Soviet rule in Eastern Europe, without distinguishing the two causes.

Some writers have characterised the ideology of this leadership in starker terms. The historian Pat Walsh has written that Sinn Féin under the new leadership advocated a corporatist social policy aimed at creating a Catholic state and favoured a form of government modelled on Portugal's Estado Novo, while rejecting fascism proper as too secular and centralised. Writing in 1955, the Dublin-based trade unionist Matt Merrigan described the leadership of the IRA as "petty-bourgeois and fringed with fascists".

== Border campaign ==
Beginning in the 1950s, the IRA started planning for a renewed armed campaign, and in 1956, a recent recruit Seán Cronin, who had considerable military experience, drew up a plan codenamed Operation Harvest.

The border campaign, as it became known, involved various military columns carrying out a range of military operations, from direct attacks on security installations to disruptive actions against infrastructure. The campaign received, initially, significant support from the south. Support increased massively after the deaths of Seán South and Fergal O'Hanlon in the Brookeborough Raid. In the Dáil Éireann elections held in 1957, Sinn Féin fielded 19 candidates and won four seats, and almost won a couple more in tightly contested elections. One of the four new Sinn Féin TDs would be future IRA Chief of Staff Ruairí Ó Brádaigh.

However, internment without trial, introduced first in Northern Ireland and then in the Republic of Ireland, curtailed IRA operations and ultimately broke morale. Eighteen people in total were killed during the campaign, of whom seven were members of the RUC, and eight were members of the IRA itself. The campaign was on the whole a failure. It petered out in the late 1950s and was officially ended in February 1962.

== 1960s: Marxist tendency and the 1969 split ==
In the 1960s the IRA once more came under the influence of left-wing thinkers, especially those such as C. Desmond Greaves and Roy Johnston active in the Connolly Association. In parallel, the position of Chief of Staff became dominated by three left-wing members: Sean Cronin, Ruairí Ó Brádaigh and Cathal Goulding.

Following the failure of the border campaign, the IRA and its allies undertook a serious review of themselves. By 1962 there were two factions in the Republican movement; the "Curragh" faction consisting of older IRA men who had served prison sentences together in the Curragh who favoured traditionalism and now controlled Sinn Féin such as Paddy McLogan, and a faction of younger, left-wing IRA members such as Ruairí Ó Brádaigh and Cathal Goulding who now controlled the IRA Army Council following post-Border campaign elections. The Curragh faction wanted to publicly declare that Sinn Féin had no part in calling off the Border campaign. They were told in stark terms they were to do no such thing, as, besides the fact this would undermine the IRA's decision to end the campaign, Sinn Féin would never have had any influence in the decision regardless, as only the IRA Army Council had the authority to begin or end campaigns. Furthermore, it was made clear by the IRA that, as far as they were concerned, Sinn Féin answered to the IRA, and not the other way around. This hardline stance by the IRA alienated the Curragh faction and many of them, including McLogan and Tony Magan, resigned from Sinn Féin in protest. In September 1962 Cathal Goulding succeeded Ó Brádaigh as IRA Chief of Staff and Tomás Mac Giolla was elected president of Sinn Féin at the ard fheis in October, leaving the new guard now in control of both Sinn Féin and the IRA.

The move to a class-based political outlook and the consequent rejection of any stance that could be seen as sectarian—including the use of IRA arms to defend one side, that side being the beleaguered Catholic communities of Belfast in the Northern Ireland riots of August 1969—was to be one of the factors in the 1969 split that led to the Provisional IRA wing of the republican movement, with the latter subscribing to a traditional Catholic/nationalist analysis of the situation while the Officials subscribed to the Marxist view that internal strife among the working classes served only the interest of capital. The Irish Department of Justice had noticed the tensions in March 1969 and advised the Dublin government to use them to fragment the IRA.

The Provisional IRA embarked on a thirty-year armed campaign against the British presence in Northern Ireland that claimed 1,707 lives. In 1997 it announced a ceasefire which effectively marked the end of its campaign. In 2005 it formally announced the end of its campaign and destroyed much of its weaponry under international supervision. As of 2025, Sinn Féin, once the political wing of the IRA, is the largest party in the Northern Ireland Assembly and the second largest party in Dáil Éireann. Its leader, Mary Lou McDonald, is the Leader of the Opposition in Dublin.

The Official IRA mounted their own armed campaign in the Troubles up to 1972, when they called a ceasefire on 30 May. However, some members engaged in some armed activities, including feuds, until 1979 when a decision was made to slant the group towards fundraising.
