= 1939 Coventry bombing =

Part of the IRA 1939–40 S-Plan campaign

1939 Coventry Bombing
- Part of S-Plan
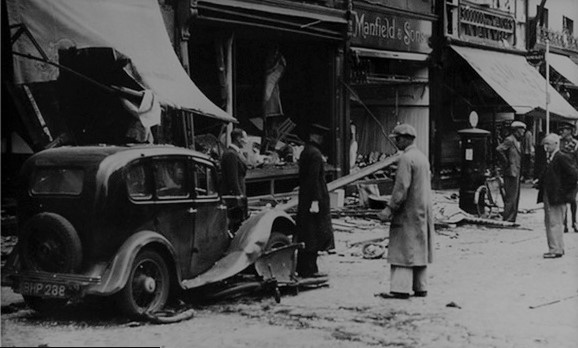
- The aftermath of the 1939 Coventry City Centre Bombing
- Location: 52°24′30.68″N 1°30′35.95″W; Broadgate, Coventry, England
- Date: 25 August 1939; 14:32 (GMT)
- Target: Public proprietors and patrons
- Attack type: Bicycle bomb
- Deaths: 5
- Injuries: 70 (12 seriously)
- Perpetrator: Irish Republican Army (IRA)

The 1939 Coventry bombing was an act of terrorism committed by the Irish Republican Army (IRA) on 25 August 1939 in which a 5.1 lb (2.3 kg) bomb upon a bicycle was placed in Coventry city centre in the West Midlands of England as part of the organisation's 1939–40 S-Plan campaign. The explosion resulted in the deaths of five civilians, with over seventy others injured.

Two IRA members were convicted of the bombing and subsequently hanged in 1940, while a third individual, who acknowledged planting the bomb, escaped. Three other individuals accused of conspiracy in the bombing were acquitted and later deported to the Republic of Ireland under government security measures.

The 1939 Coventry bombing was one of few instances within the S-Plan campaign in which civilians were killed, although republican sources later insisted that civilians were not the intended target(s) of the bombing, which had originally been intended to occur at a police station. The atrocity itself was soon overshadowed by Britain's entry into World War II, which occurred less than two weeks later.

== Background ==
In April 1938, Seán Russell was elected to the IRA Army Council in absentia. Shortly thereafter, he secured sufficient support within the Army Council for himself to be named Chief of Staff of the Irish Republican Army. At Russell's request, a leading volunteer within the organisation, Seamus O'Donovan, authored a strategic plan to extend the IRA's military campaign to mainland Britain with the aim to pressure the British government to withdraw from Northern Ireland. This strategy was named the Sabotage Campaign, colloquially known as the S-Plan.

O'Donovan's strategy was to continually target economic, military, and civic infrastructure within mainland Britain, with the targets to be located across the entire mainland and the methods not simply limited to bombings, but to include other forms of sabotage and those committing the acts to be mainland-based Irish citizens residing "[within] and around centres of population" where they could operate with little chance of their acts drawing attention. The plan was approved in August 1938; the first acts of the campaign occurred in January the following year.

By August 1939, mainland Britain had been the target of numerous S-Plan atrocities, with Coventry being the chosen target in at least six instances, although none of the bombings and arson attacks within the city had resulted in fatalities. The leader of the Coventry IRA cell was James McCormick, who used the alias James Richards.

== Coventry IRA cell ==
McCormick was born in Mullingar, County Westmeath, in 1910. A longtime member of the IRA, he had volunteered for active service upon mainland Britain upon learning of the S-Plan. Initially active in Southern England, McCormick relocated to Coventry in either late May or early June 1939, where he lodged with a young Irish-born couple: Joseph Hewitt, his wife Mary, their baby daughter Brigid Mary, and Hewitt's mother-in-law, Brigid O'Hara, at 25 Clara Street on the outskirts of Stoke Heath, paying 23s per week for bed and breakfast.

Without permission from the Hewitts or O'Hara, on or about 14 July, McCormick emptied the contents from a cupboard beneath the staircase; he them removed a section of tiles and burrowed beneath the foundations. O'Hara would later inform investigators that when she asked McCormick what he was doing, he had simply replied: "This is for a bit of a dump", although later insisted she was initially uncertain as to what McCormick implied by this sentence. Although Joseph Hewitt later exchanged "a few hot words" with McCormick, he was assured by his lodger he would repair the damage in a matter of weeks.

=== Preparations ===
The bicycle used within the bombing was purchased by McCormick and an unknown acquaintance from a Halfords bicycle shop on Smithford Street on 22 August 1939, and was of the type typically used by tradesmen at the time with a carrier basket affixed to the front handlebars. Upon purchase, McCormick and his accomplice provided the seller with a false name and address for the purchase: Mr. Norman, 56 Grayswood Avenue, Allesley Old Road, Coventry. The two paid a deposit of £5 for the bicycle, with the remaining 19s 6d to be paid upon collection on Thursday 24 August. On the day of collection, McCormick's acquaintance paid the outstanding balance and collected the bicycle. (Note: The individual who sold this bicycle would later inform police McCormick, using an alias, had paid the deposit for the bicycle on 22 August, but that the individual in his company on that date had returned alone to pay the outstanding balance and collect the bicycle two days later. McCormick refused to name this individual, and he was never identified.)

The bomb itself was constructed by McCormick and an unknown individual inside 25 Clara Street late in the evening of 24 August. The potassium chlorate to be used in the bomb was brought by train to Coventry by IRA transport officer Peter Barnes, who arrived in Coventry with the explosives at approximately 19:00 on 24 August and returned to London the same evening. (Note: Barnes was born in Banagher, County Offaly, in 1907. He had joined Fianna Éireann at the age of 14; three years later, he joined the IRA. Barnes's role as an IRA transport officer was to deliver explosives from their locations of storage—typically London, Liverpool or Glasgow—to operatives across the country. He had only arrived in mainland Britain at the beginning of August 1939.) Construction of the bomb itself was completed in the early hours of the following morning, with the device attached to a timer and concealed within a cardboard box wrapped in brown paper and tied with string. The device was then placed in the delivery basket of the bicycle.

== The bombing ==
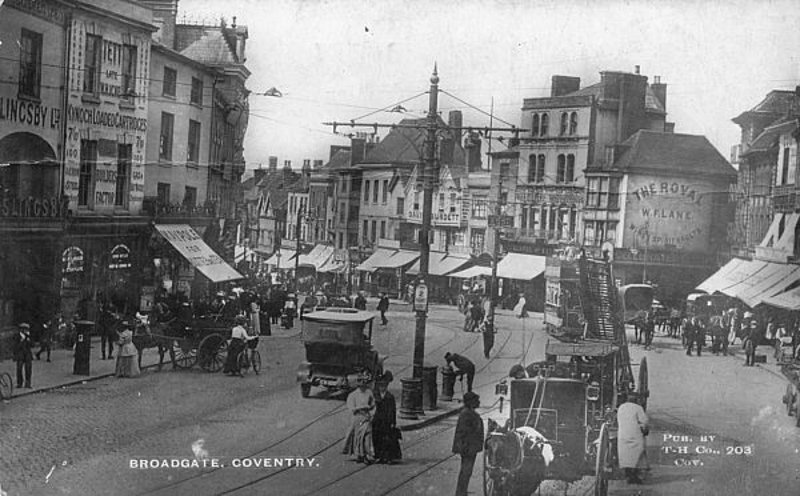
Broadgate, Coventry, pictured in 1917

At approximately 13:40 on 25 August 1939, an unknown IRA member (Note: This individual is alleged to be Joseph O'Sullivan.) left the bicycle containing the bomb standing against a kerb outside Astley's shop in the busy Broadgate area of Coventry. At 14:32, the 5.1 lb (2.3 kg) bomb exploded, killing five people and injuring seventy—many severely. Contemporary news reports describe the vicinity of the explosion as resembling a "miniature battlefield", and indicate uninjured bystanders covered the bodies of the deceased with overcoats.

The majority of those wounded in the explosion received treatment for their injuries at Coventry and Warwickshire Hospital. One of the most seriously injured, 43-year-old Harold Murdock, would die on 16 April 1940. Although his death was officially ruled as being due to natural causes, the coroner ruled at the inquest into Murdock's death that his demise was likely "accelerated" by the injuries sustained in the bombing. The final survivor to be released from hospital was 14-year-old Muriel Timms, who sustained severe leg injuries and remained hospitalized until February 1940.

=== Fatalities ===
The five who died in the Coventry bombing were Elsie Ansell, 21; John Corbett Arnott, 15; Rex Gentle, 30; James Clay, 82; and Gwilym Rowlands, 50. Ansell—the closest individual to the bicycle—was browsing a display of jewellery in a H. Samuel shop window at the time of the explosion; her facial and skull injuries were so extensive her body was only identifiable by her engagement ring. Arnott and Gentle were both employees at a nearby WH Smiths; both were returning to their workplace from a lunch break at the time of the explosion and were also killed instantly. Clay had just exited a nearby café with a business acquaintance at the time of the explosion; he died within minutes. Rowlands was a council employee working with a colleague close to the scene of the explosion; his cause of death was ruled as haemorrhaging due to multiple injuries. Both Ansell and Gentle were independently engaged to marry at the time of their deaths.

== Initial reaction ==
Suspicion almost immediately fell upon the IRA, and the bombing stoked considerable anti-Irish sentiment in Coventry. Many Irish people living in the city at the time of the bombing found that public attitude had generally turned against them despite the fact the vast majority of Irish people in the city had neither sympathy for, or connections with, the IRA. (Note: The attack was condemned by the local Irish population during Mass at all Catholic Churches in the city on Sunday 27 August.) Some Irish citizens were told to find new lodgings, whilst strike action was threatened in several local factories unless they withdrew all 2,000 Irish labourers.

An anti-IRA protest march was also staged in Baginton by employees of Armstrong Whitworth, although those participating in the march publicly emphasised that the protest was "not directed against peaceful Irishmen." The chief constable of Coventry was also forced to issue a public denial of rumors he was Irish, stating that he was a "perfectly good Somerset man" who had never even set foot in Ireland.

== Investigation ==
Within hours of the bombing, forensic investigators had recovered fragments of a timing device at the crime scene—confirming suspicions the explosion had been caused by a time bomb. Furthermore, eyewitnesses confirmed the bicycle had been parked at the location, directly behind a car, for between three-quarters of an hour and an hour before detonation.

Although the vast majority of the bicycle frame was destroyed in the explosion, the serial number was still visible upon the remnants of the rear of the frame, enabling investigators to trace the bicycle to the Halfords on Smithford Street. The owner confirmed he had sold the bike to two Irishmen—one of whom gave his name as Norman—on 22 August, and that the bicycle had been collected from his premises the day before the bombing. Furthermore, the Irishman who had collected the bicycle and paid the outstanding balance was not the same individual who had paid the £5 deposit. The name and address given by these individuals proved to be false, although the seller provided police with detailed descriptions of both men.

=== Arrests ===
Barnes was arrested at his lodgings in Westbourne Terrace, London, at 20:50 on the evening of the bombing. His arrest resulted from an independent Special Branch police raid upon a flat in Leinster Gardens, West London, in relation to numerous local thefts of bicycles by the tenants of the property which investigators suspected of being used in the transportation of explosives around the city by the IRA. A search of the property revealed a large quantity of explosives stowed in hat boxes and a timing device. Questioning of the four Irishmen arrested revealed the explosives were brought to the property by one Peter Barnes. One of these individuals provided police with his address, and Barnes was arrested as he returned to the property from Coventry.

A search of Barnes's address uncovered ample incriminating evidence with regards to the Coventry bombing, including a suitcase bearing traces of potassium chlorate, and an unposted letter to an acquaintance in Ireland in which Barnes detailed his involvement in and expectation of a forthcoming "spectacular" bombing and concluding with "I am coming back from Coventry tonight 11:30, so by the time you get this, the [newspapers] should have some news." When asked if he had been to Coventry earlier that day, Barnes replied he had, before adding, "Coincidences can happen, can't they?" He was promptly arrested and detained at Canon Row Police Station, but refused to name the man he had provided the explosives to in Coventry.

On 28 August, the Coventry City Police, along with members of Special Branch, conducted a thorough search of 25 Clara Street. This search also uncovered a suitcase bearing traces of potassium chlorate, plus tools and equipment sufficient for the purpose of constructing bombs and incendiary devices such as pincers, soldering material, and insulating tape. Also recovered were pieces of paper torn from a four-and-a-half volt dry cell battery and a new and untarnished brass setting device used to set the hands of an alarm clock. This device did not fit any clock in the house. All occupants of the property were arrested under the Explosive Substances Act 1883. Initially released pending deportation, those arrested at Clara Street were re-arrested on 2 September.

==== Written statements ====
I went upstairs to see what they had been doing in my room. I saw a parcel wrapped in brown paper and tied with string lying on the floor in the centre of the room. I did not go near the parcel. I was upset as I knew what they had done and were going to make an explosion, but I did not know where. I was upset because they had used my bedroom. I left my bedroom and went out of my house and returned to work at about a quarter-past one o'clock. I left [McCormick] and the strange man in my bedroom ... about a quarter to four, a girl in my workplace told me that a terrible explosion had happened in Broadgate ... If I had known for sure what [McCormick] and the other man were doing that morning and where the bomb was going to be placed, I would have surely told the police.

— Section of Mary Hewitt's written statement, given to Coventry City Police. 3 September 1939.

The following day, both Brigid O'Hara and Mary Hewitt provided written statements in which they admitted several "strange men" had visited McCormick at their house in recent weeks, often bringing suitcases and substances they had suspected were explosives. Neither had known of McCormick's IRA affiliations at the time he had initially lodged with them, although his connections and activity soon became apparent to both. Furthermore, McCormick had always spoken with the men who visited him behind closed doors so that neither woman could hear details of their conversations.

Hewitt added that, beginning in mid-August, she had observed McCormick frequently take "white powder" out of a suitcase which he then made "into parcels"; he had continued this practice until the suitcase was empty. He had initially stowed this suitcase in the scullery before placing the suitcase in the family coal shed once it was empty. In addition, shortly after midday on 25 August, she had observed McCormick and a man she did not know the name of working with tools on a wooden box in her own bedroom.

Both women remained adamant they had been fearful of reprisals from not just McCormick but also Joseph Hewitt who, although not a member of the IRA, was sympathetic to their cause. They had therefore chosen to remain silent about these activities.

When shown a photograph of Barnes, both women subsequently identified him as having visited their home for the first time on 21 August—apparently to acquaint himself with McCormick and discuss the transportation of the explosives. O'Hara further admitted McCormick had asked her to purchase a suitcase for Barnes during this visit. This suitcase was the one recovered from Barnes's property; the receipt for this purchase was found in the possession of Barnes's fiancée.

=== Formal charges ===
On 27 September, Barnes and McCormick, Joseph and Mary Hewitt, and Brigid O'Hara, were each charged with the murder of Elsie Ansell. One week later, on 4 October, each was formally charged with all five murders. The charges against each defendant were later revised to bring each to a joint trial for the murder of Elsie Ansell.

== Trial ==
The trial of all five defendants began on 11 December 1939 at the Warwick Assizes in Birmingham. Each defendant was tried before Mr Justice Singleton. All five defendants pleaded not guilty.

Although the prosecution acknowledged none of the defendants had actually constructed or planted the bomb, the Crown contended all had played an active part in a conspiracy to endanger life; as such, all were charged with murder.

Both Barnes and McCormick testified at the trial; each admitted to being members of the IRA and their respective roles as explosives transport officer and the stowing, usage, and distribution of tools and ingredients used in the construction of explosives, but emphasised upon the stand that their orders were strictly not to endanger non-combatant life. McCormick also admitted to having purchased the bicycle used in the bombing. He also refused to name the individual who had assisted in the construction of the bomb and had subsequently planted the device, simply informing the prosecutor, "I refuse to give you his name, but it was not Peter Barnes."

The Hewitts and O'Hara admitted to holding suspicions as to McCormick's IRA affiliations and activity, but denied knowing anything of the bombing plot or the identity of the individual who had assisted Barnes and McCormick. The two women admitted to holding suspicions of the "white powder" in McCormick's possession being explosives, whereas Joseph Hewitt claimed to have "no idea" of the substance's source. He also confirmed claims earlier made by his wife and mother-in-law upon the stand that both had asked him "more than once" in the weeks prior to the bombing to evict McCormick from the property, before testifying he had failed to do so.

=== Convictions ===
The trial of all defendants lasted four days, with each individual visibly displaying emotion on more than one occasion. On 15 December, the jury retired to consider their verdict. They deliberated for just thirty-one minutes before reaching their verdicts: Joseph and Mary Hewitt and Bridget O'Hara were acquitted of all charges; all three were subsequently deported to the Irish Republic under government security measures. Barnes and McCormick, however, were sentenced to death for their part in the bombing— the jury agreeing with the prosecution's contention that the two had collectively constructed and assembled the bomb even if neither had intended for the device to detonate at the location it ultimately had.

As the judge prepared to deliver sentence, McCormick requested to address the court. His request was granted. McCormick first thanked his defence counsel before stating: "As a soldier of the Irish Republican Army I am not afraid to die, as I am doing it for a just cause. I say in conclusion, God bless Ireland and God bless the men who have fought and died for her. Thank you, my lord." Judge Singleton then donned his black cap and proclaimed: "Peter Barnes and James McCormick, the jury have returned a true verdict according to the evidence. The sentence of the Court upon each of you is that you be taken from this place to a lawful prison, and thence to a place of execution and that you be there hanged by the neck until you are dead, and that you afterwards be buried within the precincts of the prison in which you shall have been confined before your execution, and may the Lord have mercy on your souls."

Both men chose to appeal their convictions, although their appeals were dismissed by the Court of Appeal on 23 January 1940.

== Executions ==
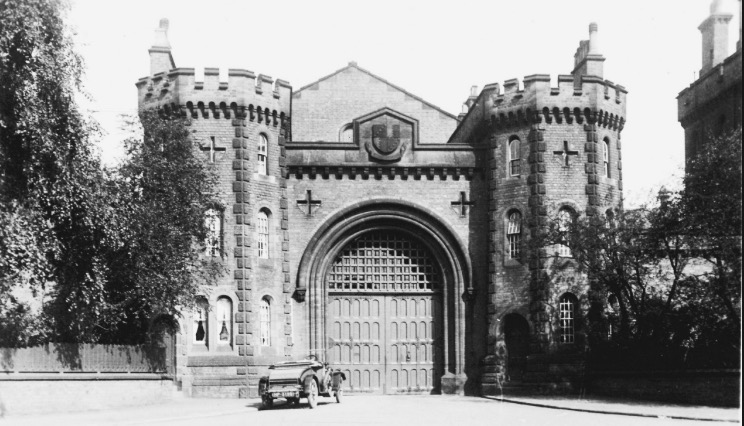
Winson Green Prison. Barnes and McCormick were executed within the grounds of this prison on 7 February 1940

Barnes and McCormick were hanged at Birmingham's Winson Green Prison on 7 February 1940. At the time of their executions, Barnes was 32 years old, whereas McCormick was 29 years old. According to contemporary accounts, both men received a final blessing at 8:50 a.m. before walking together to the gallows. As the two were led to the gallows, Barnes continued to protest his innocence, whereas McCormick remained defiant—continually shouting republican propaganda. Both men were buried in graves bearing only their initials within the confines of the prison, where their bodies remained until they were repatriated to the Irish Republic in 1969. The executioner of both men was Thomas Pierrepoint.

On the evening prior to the executions, McCormick penned a final letter to his sister in which he wrote: "This is my farewell letter as I have been just told I have to die in the morning. I know that I would have to die, so the news did not come as a great shock to me, but thank God I am prepared. As I know I am dying for a just cause, I shall walk out tomorrow smiling as I shall be thinking of God and of the good men who went before me for the same cause."

The same evening, Barnes also penned a letter to his brother in which he again professed his innocence and describing his mindset as being "reconciled to what God knows best." Barnes also informed his brother a Mass was to be held for he and McCormick "in the morning before we go to our death"; concluding with the sentence: "Thank God I have nothing to be afraid of. I am an innocent man."

Prior to the executions, the Irish Taoiseach, Éamon de Valera, had repeatedly motioned for the sentences of Barnes and McCormick to be commuted; his final request was dismissed by the Secretary of State for Dominion Affairs, Anthony Eden, on 29 January 1940. Public mourning was widespread across Ireland on the day of the executions, with flags flown at half-mast.

== Aftermath ==
The executions of Barnes and McCormick would prove to be the last instance in which IRA members would be executed by the British legal system; the bombing would also prove to take place just nine days before Britain's entry into World War II.

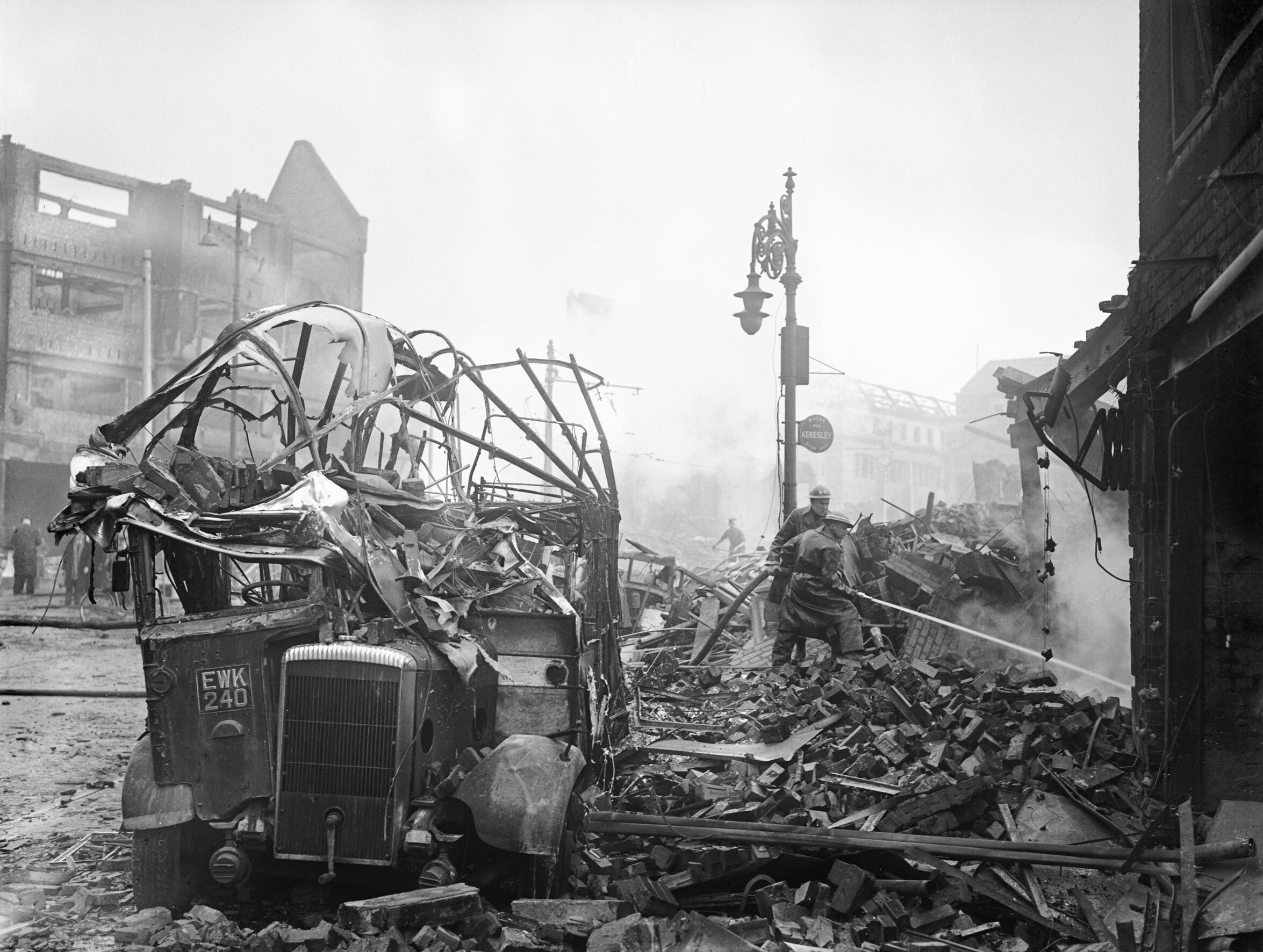
The aftermath of a 1940 air raid upon Coventry

The outbreak of World War II on 3 September ultimately saw the Coventry bombing soon dissipate from the headlines. The Blitz of 1940 saw Coventry's city centre—including the Broadgate area—decimated by the Luftwaffe, thus ultimately leading to the 1939 Coventry bombing to become known as the city's "forgotten bombing".

While the official objective of the IRA's S-Plan was to force a British withdrawal from Northern Ireland, given the close proximity of the date of the bombing to Britain's entry into World War II and the fact Ireland remained neutral during World War II, some have claimed the Coventry bombing was intended to either "aid the German (war) cause" or as a "public display" of the IRA's strength to Germany.

Both Barnes and McCormick were widely viewed as martyrs in Ireland, with many British Irish sharing similar sentiments. In 1949, a London-based republican committee was formed to campaign for the men's bodies to be the repatriated to Ireland. Twenty years later, in 1969, their bodies were exhumed and—on 6 July—flown to Dublin City. Upon arrival at Dublin Airport, their coffins were met with an IRA guard of honour. Family members of both men were also present at the repatriation.

Both men were reburied in Ballyglass Cemetery in Mullingar, County Westmeath, in a service attended by approximately 15,000 people. Republican Jimmy Steele recited the graveside oration.

The Coventry bomb was initially believed to have been originally destined to detonate at an electricity generating plant located on the outskirts of the city. However, in 1969, speaking to Irish journalist Michael Burns, IRA member Joseph O'Sullivan admitted to actually planting the bomb in Broadgate and revealed the actual intended target was a police station. O'Sullivan also alleged that, en route, the bicycle used in the transportation had repeatedly gotten stuck in tram tracks, thus leading him to abandon the bike in Broadgate. He had not attempted to notify authorities of the impending explosion.

O'Sullivan also revealed the reason he was not caught or charged with the bombing was because he had foreseen that authorities would arrest and interrogate all Irishmen attempting to board a ferry bound for Ireland via the portal town of Holyhead with a ticket purchased in Coventry or Birmingham in the hours or days following the explosion. Upon abandoning the bicycle in Broadgate, he had caught a train to Leicester, where he later purchased a ticket to travel to Dublin via Holyhead.

In October 2015 a sandstone monument was unveiled in the grounds of Unity Lawn at Coventry Cathedral. This memorial stone also bears a plaque inscribed with the names and ages of those who died in the explosion. The unveiling of this memorial was attended by numerous people, including relatives of four of the victims.

On the centenary year of the Easter Rising, the Spirit of Irish Freedom Society Westmeath held a graveside commemoration to honour fallen republicans from the Midland Region. At this service, the Thomas Allen Society led a cortège of over fifty people to the graveside of Barnes and McCormick in Ballyglass Cemetery, where wreaths were placed on the graves of both men.

== See also ==
- British rule in Ireland
- Clandestine cell system
- Irish Republican Army (1922–1969)
- List of designated terrorist groups
- Physical force Irish republicanism
- Sabotage Campaign

== Cited works and further reading ==
- Adams, Ian (2010). The Sabotage Plan: The IRA Bombing Campaign in England 1939 - 1940. Spiker Publications. ISBN 978-1-446-70913-9.
- Chalk, Peter (2012). The Encyclopedia of Terrorism – Volume 1. ABC-CLIO. ISBN 978-0-313-30895-6.
- Crowley, John (2017). Atlas of the Irish Revolution. New York University Press. ISBN 978-1-479-83428-0.
- Fairfield, Letitia (1995) [1953]. The Trial of Peter Barnes and Others: The I.R.A. Coventry Explosion of 1939. Notable British Trials. W. Hodge. ISBN 978-1-561-69184-5.
- Geraghty, Tony (1998). The Irish War: The Hidden Conflict Between the IRA and British Intelligence. Harper Collins. ISBN 0-8018-6456-9.
- Hull, Mark M. (2004). Irish Secrets: German Espionage in Wartime Ireland 1939–1945. Irish Academic Press Ltd. ISBN 0-7165-2807-X.
- Kirby, Dick (2021). IRA Terror on Britain's Streets 1939–1940: The Wartime Bombing Campaign and Hitler Connection. Pen & Sword Books. ISBN 978-1-526-78642-5.
- MacEoin, Uinseann (1997). The IRA in the Twilight Years: 1923 -1948. Argenta Publications. ISBN 978-0-951-11724-8.
- McGladdery, Gary (2006). The Provisional IRA in England: The Bombing Campaign 1973–1997. Irish Academic Press Ltd. ISBN 978-0-716-53374-0.
- McKenna, Joseph (2016). The IRA Bombing Campaign Against Britain, 1939–1940. McFarland & Co. ISBN 978-1-4766-6258-9.
- Oppenheimer, A. R. (2008). IRA, the Bombs and the Bullets: A History of Deadly Ingenuity. Irish Academic Press. ISBN 978-0-716-52895-1.
- Tarpey, Marie Veronica (1976) [1969]. The Role of Joseph McGarrity in the Struggle for Irish Independence. Arno Press. ISBN 978-0-405-09360-9.
- Taylor, Frederick (2015). Coventry: Thursday, 14 November 1940. Bloomsbury Publishing Plc. ISBN 978-1-408-86027-4.
- Wood, Ian S. (2010). Britain, Ireland and the Second World War. Edinburgh University Press. ISBN 978-0-748-62327-3.
