= S-Plan =

1939–40 IRA military operation against the United Kingdom

Sabotage Campaign
- Location: England
- Planned by: Seamus O'Donovan, Seán Russell, Joseph McGarrity
- Target: Civil and military infrastructure of the United Kingdom
- Date: 16 January 1939 – March 1940
- Executed by: Irish Republican Army (IRA)
- Outcome: IRA campaign fails
- Casualties: 10 killed 96 injured

The S-Plan or Sabotage Campaign or England Campaign was a campaign of bombing and sabotage against the civil, economic and military infrastructure of the United Kingdom from 1939 to 1940, conducted by members of the Irish Republican Army (IRA). It was conceived by Seamus O'Donovan in 1938 at the request of then IRA Chief of Staff Seán Russell. Russell and Joseph McGarrity are thought to have formulated the strategy in 1936. During the campaign there were 300 explosions/acts of sabotage, 10 deaths and 96 injuries.

== Immediate context ==
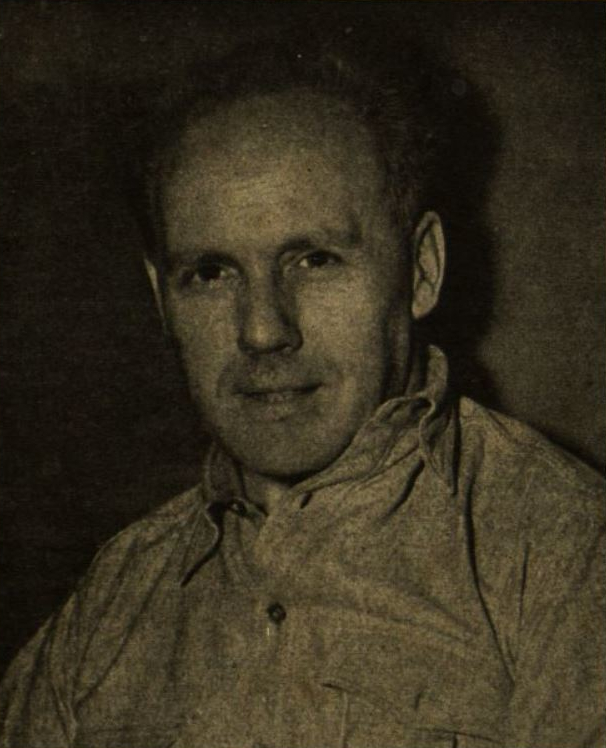
IRA Chief of Staff Seán Russell.

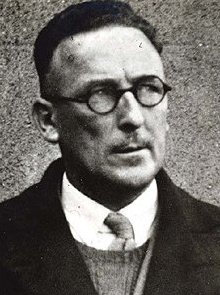
Seamus O'Donovan prepared the S-Plan at the behest of Russell.

Following a power struggle within the IRA during the mid-1930s, Seán Russell was reinstated to the IRA in April 1938 and elected to the IRA Army Council in absentia. At a subsequent IRA General Army Convention, Russell and his supporters secured enough support to get a controlling majority vote within the Army Council and for Russell himself to be named Chief of Staff, the head of the organisation. It was at this time that Russell began the process of preparing for a campaign of attacks on British soil – a strategy he had decided upon from the mid-1930s onwards. The IRA in Northern Ireland supported Russell and his plans for a campaign that would bring an end to partition. However, the Northern Ireland government introduced internment in December 1938 and several hundred IRA activists were held for the duration of World War II.

Seamus (Jim) O'Donovan had been asked by Seán Russell directly after his election to IRA Chief of Staff in 1938 to formulate his ideas on the possibilities of successful acts of sabotage on British soil. O'Donovan was the former Director of Chemicals of the "old IRA" and an acknowledged expert in the use of explosive material. He had not been active in politics since retiring from public life in 1923. Russell's request followed directly from him taking on the role of IRA Chief of Staff of the "new IRA" army council. The notes which O'Donovan created for Russell became the S-Plan or Sabotage Plan.

On 17 December 1938, the Wolfe Tone Weekly newspaper published a statement issued by a group signing itself the "Executive Council of Dáil Éireann, Government of the Republic". This group perceived itself to be the legitimate government of the 32-County Irish Republic and refused to recognise the legitimacy of partition. In the statement, seven Second Dáil TDs declared that they had delegated what they believed to be their governmental "authority" to the Army Council.

This announcement, coming immediately prior to the S-Plan attacks, sought to present the actions of the IRA as those of a legitimate, de jure government. Within this context, with the Army Council purporting to act as a government with the right to use force and levy war against an occupying power, the IRA declared war on Britain in January 1939.

== Details and preparation ==
The S-Plan contained many precise instructions for acts of destruction which had as their object the paralysis of all official activity in England and the greatest possible destruction of British defence installations.

It divided the IRA campaign into two main lines: propaganda and offensive (military) action. The document listed six different types of offensive action;

- Military action that was classified as not very promising
- The destruction of armament factories
- The disruption of all civil/public utilities such as transport undertakings, waterways, gasworks, power stations, water-supply facilities, etc.
- Attacks that were planned against specific industrial plants
- Attacks that were planned against a large number of commercial premises
- Attacks against large newspaper organisations

Operations were strictly concentrated on the island of Great Britain, in and around centres of population where IRA volunteers could operate freely without drawing attention. No attacks on targets in Northern Ireland or other areas under British control were planned as part of the S-Plan.

Military preparations for the campaign included a series of attacks on British customs houses in Northern Ireland. On 28 and 29 November 1938, British customs posts along the border were demolished using explosives. The only fatalities were three IRA volunteers, Jimmy Joe Reynolds from County Leitrim, John James Kelly from County Donegal, and Charlie McCafferty from County Tyrone, killed by the premature explosion of a mine at a house in Castlefin, County Donegal on 28 November 1938.

Russell is said to have distributed O'Donovan's notes virtually unedited to IRA battlegroups as an operational instruction from the Army Council. O'Donovan appears, at the time of writing the S-Plan, to have been oblivious to the decision to begin a campaign of attacks on British soil in 1939. However, because of his level of expertise, he was later involved in a new round of explosives training for IRA volunteers in Dublin from 1938 to 1939. Patrick McGrath was reputed to be one of the principal instructors in bomb making for this campaign. On 6 September 1940 McGrath was executed by firing squad at Dublin's Mountjoy Prison.

Sources of funding for the campaign are not known, but once the campaign was operational, the weekly expenses for operations in the field amounted to approximately £700. Operational units were expected to raise any money needed themselves, and the men who acted within IRA teams were unpaid and expected to support themselves while on missions.

The make-up of these teams is thought to have been different from the cell structure employed by the Provisional Irish Republican Army in their campaign against Britain in the 1970s. It is known from arrests made during the campaign that the IRA utilised material dumps in Britain built up in 1938, as well as devices improvised while on active duty in Britain. IRA volunteers arriving from Ireland were also intercepted by British authorities transporting war material for use in the campaign.

The strength of the IRA and the women's paramilitary organisation Cumann Na mBan at this time was estimated at between 5,000 and 30,000 men and women at varying stages of training and ability. In the autumn of 1938 training of volunteers was held prior to the beginning of the campaign in a camp eight miles north of Sligo town. However, some volunteers were sent to Britain also included new raw recruits such as Brendan Behan. In early 1938 IRA leaders Moss Twomey and Jack McNeela were sent to Britain to assess the movement's strength there in spring 1938 and reported that:

"In general it can be said that the state of the organisation in units which exist is poor and loose, and militarily should be described as almost elementary."

Seán Russell left to pursue the finance aspect with IRA's American financier Joe McGarrity, and the propaganda phase of the S-plan in the United States, in March 1939, after the S-Plan military phase began in January 1939. On leaving, he appointed Stephen Hayes as Acting Chief of Staff of the IRA. Russell never returned to Ireland, dying on board a German submarine from an untreated gastric ulcer in 1940 and being buried at sea.

== Declaration of war on Britain ==
On 12 January 1939, the Army Council sent an ultimatum, signed by Patrick Fleming, to British Foreign Secretary Lord Halifax. The communiqué duly informed the British government of "The Government of the Irish Republic's" intention to go to "war". Excerpt from the ultimatum:

I have the honour to inform you that the Government of the Irish Republic, having as its first duty towards its people the establishment and maintenance of peace and order here, demand the withdrawal of all British armed forces stationed in Ireland. The occupation of our territory by troops of another nation and the persistent subvention here of activities directly against the expressed national will and in the interests of a foreign power, prevent the expansion and development of our institution in consonance with our social needs and purposes, and must cease.

The Government of the Irish Republic believe that a period of four days is sufficient notice for your Government to signify its intentions in the matter of the military evacuation and for the issue of your Declaration of Abdication in respect of our country. Our Government reserves the right of appropriate action without further notice if upon the expiration of this period of grace, these conditions remain unfulfilled.

Óglaigh na h-Éireann (Irish Republican Army).
General Headquarters, Dublin, January 12th, 1939, to His Excellency the Rt. Hon. Viscount Halifax, C.G.B.

On Sunday, 15 January, with no reply from the British Government, a proclamation was posted in public places throughout Ireland announcing the IRA's declaration of war on Britain. This proclamation was written by Joseph McGarrity, leader of Clan na Gael in the United States, and was signed by six members of the Army Council: Stephen Hayes, Patrick Fleming, Peadar O'Flaherty, George Oliver Plunkett, Larry Grogan and Seán Russell. The seventh Army Council member, Máirtín Ó Cadhain, refused to sign as he believed the IRA was not ready to begin the campaign.

This proclamation also called upon Irishmen both at home and "in Exile" to give their utmost support to compel the withdrawal of the British from the island of Ireland so that a free Irish Republic could be established. As the campaign began in Britain the same proclamation appeared posted around Irish communities in British cities. The proclamation referenced back to the 17 December 1938 statement by the group naming itself the "Executive Council of Dáil Éireann, Government of the Republic" and read:

"On the twenty-third day of April in the year 1916 in the City of Dublin, seven men, who were representative in spirit and outlook and purpose of the Irish Nation that had never yielded to nor accepted the British conquest, set their humble and almost unknown names to the foregoing document that has passed into history, making the names of the seven signatories immortal. These signatures were sealed with the blood of the immortal seven, and of many others who followed them into one of the most gallant fights in the history of the world; and the Irish Nation rose from shame to honour, from humiliation to pride, from slavery to freedom...."

"Unfortunately, because men were foolish enough to treat with an armed enemy within their gates, the English won the peace. Weakness and treachery caused a resumption of the war and the old English tactics of 'divide and conquer' were exploited to the fullest extent. Partition was introduced, the country divided into two parts with two separate Parliaments subject to and controlled by the British Government. The armed forces of England still occupy six of our counties in the North and reserve the right 'in time of war or strained relations' to reoccupy the ports which they have just evacuated in the southern part of Ireland. Ireland is still tied, as she has been for centuries past, to take part in England's wars. In the Six Counties, a large number of Republican soldiers are held prisoners by England. Further weakness on the part of some of our people, broken faith and make-believe, have postponed the enthronement of the living Republic, but the proclamation of Easter Week and the declaration of independence stand and must stand for ever. No man, no matter how far he has fallen away from his national faith, has dared to repudiate them. They constitute the rallying centre for the unbought manhood of Ireland in the fight that must be made to make them effective and to redeem the nation's self-respect that was abandoned by a section of our people in 1923."

"The time has come to make that fight. There is no need to redeclare the Republic of Ireland, now or in the future. There is no need to reaffirm the declaration of Irish independence. But the hour has come for the supreme effort to make both effective. So in the name of the unconquered dead and the faithful living, we pledge ourselves to that task. We call upon England to withdraw her armed forces, her civilian officials and institutions, and representatives of all kinds from every part of Ireland as an essential preliminary to arrangements for peace and friendship between the two countries; and we call upon the people of all Ireland, at home and in exile, to assist us in the effort we, are about to make, in God's name, to compel that evacuation and to enthrone the Republic of Ireland."

The S-Plan came as a total surprise to the Dublin government, there was even a suggestion that the attacks were a plot to prevent a peaceful settlement to the border question.

== Timeline ==
=== 1939 ===
==== January ====
- 16 January – Five bombs exploded in London, while three exploded in Manchester. According to The Times (on 18 January), another one targeted Hams Hall power stations and two of the principal water mains supplying the station. A porter was killed in Manchester. During the campaign Richard Goss was the IRA's Operations Officer in Manchester.
- 17 January
  - In Barton-upon-Irwell, an attempt was made to bomb an electricity pylon stretching across the Manchester Ship Canal. The bag of dynamite and gelignite failed to explode due to a faulty timer.
  - In Great Barr, a bomb exploded at an electricity pylon, cutting off the supply for a number of hours.
  - In Coleshill there were explosions at Hams Hall Power Station, the main source of Birmingham's electricity supply.
  - In London a bomb exploded at Williams Deacons Bank; gas mains were damaged.
  - The British Government sought to improve security of infrastructure in England. All power stations, gas works, telephone exchanges, and the Droitwich transmitting station were put under police protection. Police patrols around the government buildings at Whitehall were strongly reinforced and all ships from Ireland arriving at Holyhead, Fishguard and Liverpool were closely inspected.
- 18 January
  - The Times reported a total of nine explosions designed to "cripple electricity services" since 16 January.
  - 14 arrests were made in connection with the attacks; 7 in Manchester and 7 in London. Each of the men was charged under Section 4 of the Explosive Substances Act 1883.
  - Eight 1cwt barrels of potassium chlorate, a large quantity of powdered charcoal, and 40 sticks of gelignite were uncovered.
- 19 January – In Tralee, County Kerry a small bomb concealed in a tobacco tin exploded in the yard of Hawneys Hotel. Francis Chamberlain, the British Prime Minister's only son, had been staying there during a shooting holiday. The police discovered the bomb but it went off before it could be defused.
- 20 January
  - Seán Russell had a notice printed in the Dublin newspapers in which he dissociated himself from the Hawneys Hotel attack the previous day. It stated "IRA Headquarters had no knowledge of this attack, nor would it order or countenance such an action". This unsanctioned action is assumed to have been carried by a local non S-Plan-involved IRA unit.
  - In Lancashire, an unexploded package of gelignite and a stopped alarm clock timer were found attached to an electricity pylon.
  - Arrests were made, with a London man charged with possession of 2 tons of potassium chlorate and 1 ton of iron oxide between 1 October and 5 November 1938.
- 22 January – In Vauxhall an arrest was made in connection with the Southwark explosion.
- 23 January – In Manchester two women were arrested on possession of explosives. Items seized included one barrel of potassium chlorate, two Mills bombs, 49 sticks of gelignite, and 10 electric detonators. Sir Dawson Bates, then Northern Ireland Minister of Home Affairs, revealed the existence of an "execution list of NI officials" (which had been seized in Belfast) to the British press.

==== February ====
- 4 February
  - Two major bombs exploded in the London Underground – one at Tottenham Court Road station and one at Leicester Square station. They were timed suitcase bombs stored in the left-luggage rooms overnight. There were no fatalities, although two people were seriously injured and severe damage was done to the facilities. This attack generated a good deal of panic and alarm amongst the British population.
  - Questions were asked in the British Parliament about the IRA's 12 January ultimatum to the British government. The ultimatum had previously been publicised in the British newspapers following the 17 January attack. British Home Secretary Sir Samuel Hoare informed the House of Commons that the police had already arrested 33 people in connection with the attacks up to that point and that the security authorities were doing everything within their power to find the perpetrators.
  - In Liverpool, an unsuccessful attempt was made to blow up one wall of Walton Gaol, but the wall was not penetrated.
  - In London, fires broke out within half an hour of each other in shops in one of the suburbs. The British police established that in each case the fire was due to a chemical mixture which ignited when exposed to the air.
  - Plans to blow up Buckingham Palace were reported by The Times to have been found in Belfast. As a result, night and day guards were placed around the grounds of Royal Lodge and Windsor Great Park. All visitors to the state apartments at Windsor Castle and St. George's Chapel were also reported to have been stopped and searched before being allowed entry.
- 5 February
  - In Coventry, fires in four department stores began and were attributed to incendiary devices, balloon bombs being suspected. The stores affected were Marks & Spencer, Owen & Owen Ltd, the packing department of Montague Burton Ltd, and Woolworths.
  - In Bristol, guns were issued to police after the discovery of a note in a petrol storage depot reading "BEWARE. These tanks are the next to be blown up". Watches were put on Avonmouth Docks and Bristol Airport.
  - Arrests were made and seven hand-grenades, gelignite, ammunition, and the S-Plan document itself were seized. The S-Plan is thought to have been found on a detained IRA volunteer.
  - Threats were received that the following buildings would be blown up: Bow Street Police Station in London, and the offices of the South Wales Echo in Cardiff. A man claiming to be the "Chief of Staff of the IRA in Cardiff" demanded the release of volunteers held there.
- 7 February – In the streets of Derry, IRA supporters burnt thousands of leaflets issued by the British Government calling for "voluntary national service".
- 8 February – Two Bills giving the Government of Ireland (the territory formerly known as the Irish Free State) extraordinary powers were introduced in the Dáil. The first of these, called the Treason Act, imposed the death penalty for persons guilty of treason as defined in Article XXXIX of the Irish Constitution. This penalty was to apply whether the act was committed within or outside the boundaries of the State. Its aim was curtailing IRA activity both within the Irish state and the United Kingdom. The second measure, called the Offences against the State Act, made it possible for citizens to be interned without trial, and conferred elaborate powers of search, arrest, and detention upon the police. It declared seditious any suggestion in a newspaper or magazine that the elected Government of Ireland was not the lawful government.

The IRA had been declared an illegal organisation under the Constitution (Declaration of Unlawful Association) Order passed 18 June 1936, but the Irish Free State Government had only used this power on a few IRA volunteers. Éamon de Valera spoke about the IRA and S-Plan in the Dáil for two hours. He said that the IRA had no right to assume the title "Irish Republican Government" and that the Irish Minister for Justice, PJ Ruttledge, planned to bring "energetic measures" before the house to combat the IRA.

- 9 February
  - The Times continued in its efforts to calm British public opinion when it printed:
    The signatories of the ridiculous ultimatum to Great Britain are men of no account. Nobody in this country would have taken them seriously, but for the recent outrages in Great Britain. As a political force in Éire, the IRA simply does not count.
  - In London, two bombs exploded at Kings Cross railway station, and bomb threats were made to the National History Museum.
- 13 February – An incendiary balloon device set fire to the steam ship St. David.

==== March ====
- 2 March – In London, a bomb exploded on an aqueduct for the Grand Union Canal near Stonebridge Park. In Wednesbury, Staffordshire a bomb exploded on an aqueduct for the Birmingham Canal Navigations. Both devices only damaged the concrete walls of the beds of the canals. It has been speculated that, had the dynamite been placed 18 inches lower, they would have caused considerable flooding over the lower-lying adjoining fields.
- 3 March – In Willesden a railway man, Henry George West, prevented a bomb attack on a railway bridge during the night.
- 23 March: Four bombs exploded in Coventry.
- 29 March – In London, two bombs exploded on Hammersmith Bridge causing considerable damage. All bus and vehicle traffic was diverted and did not resume for one month.
- 30 March – Bombs exploded in Birmingham, Liverpool, and Coventry.
- 31 March – In London, seven bombs exploded.

==== April ====
- 5 April – In Liverpool, two bombs exploded at a railway station and council buildings. One bomb exploded in Coventry.
- 10 April – At a republican demonstration (commemorating the Easter Rising) at the Glasnevin Cemetery in Dublin, a communiqué from the IRA Army council was read out which announced that the "operation groups" of the IRA in Britain carried out their tasks in accordance with orders without causing casualties, the avoidance of which had been expressly ordered. The communiqué also stated that the order to avoid casualties could be countermanded if Britain had recourse to extreme measures.
- 12 April – Threat made to blow up Catford Bridge, Lewisham.
- 13 April – In London and Birmingham, 11 bombs exploded. These had the appearance of being no more than trial explosions as all occurred in public lavatories. According to the announcement by public officials in Britain, these bombs contained new chemical mixtures which were mainly composed of carbide.

==== May ====
- 4 May – Appearance in court of men and women charged under Explosive Substances Act 1883 in a Birmingham courtroom. They were charged with belonging to an IRA team working from "the headquarters in the Midlands for manufacturing incendiary and explosive bombs".
- 5 May
  - In Liverpool, tear gas bombs exploded in two cinemas, causing 15 injuries.
  - In Coventry, four bombs exploded.
  - In London, two bombs exploded.
- 13 May – In London, three explosions occurred in Underground (train) stations.
- 16 May
  - Two men appear in the Special Criminal Court, charged with having incriminating documents and with being members of an unlawful organisation. They are named as Joseph Farrell 32 St. Attracta Road, Cabra, and Joseph Noone of 60 Upper Dorest Street. They were sentenced to time in The Curragh Camp.
  - Arrests made and seizure of 8 lbs of potassium chlorate, two powder fuses, 12 26 and a half sticks of gelignite, two sticks of saxonite, fuses, a revolver and ammunition, twenty-nine balloons, and street maps of Salford, Manchester and Liverpool. An unexploded bomb, found abandoned on a bus, was identified with this material when the arrests were made.
- 18 May – Two men sentenced to 10 and 15 years penal servitude for possession of 10 bundles of gelignite, a 5-pound pack of gelignite, 103 detonators, and 4 balloons.
- 19 May
  - Eight timed incendiary bombs caused fires to break out in eight British hotels.
  - Eight arrests made in Birmingham in connection with an explosion at a house in Manchester.
- 29 May – In Birmingham, four magnesium charges exploded in the Paramount Cinema.
- 30 May – IRA "General Call to Arms" sounded, with hundreds of IRA members running from house to house collecting gas masks and burning around 1,000 in heaps in 15 streets.
- 30 May – In Liverpool and Birmingham, magnesium and tear gas bombs exploded during the evening show in cinemas. Twenty-five people had to be taken to hospital but no material damage was done.
- 31 May – Seanad Éireann (the Irish Senate) approved the Offences against the State Act, and it was put into effect after being signed by President Douglas Hyde.
- 31 May – In London, cinemas were attacked with incendiaries, prompting the police to search every London cinema.

==== June ====
- 7 June – In Detroit, USA, Seán Russell was arrested at the request of Scotland Yard. He had been conducting a speaking tour as part of the propaganda arm of the S-plan.
- 9 June – Letter bombs exploded in twenty postboxes. One went off in a London sorting office and another in a Birmingham mail lorry. Every postbox in London was searched for further IRA devices.
- 10 June – In London, Birmingham and Manchester, bombs exploded in thirty post offices and postboxes. Seventeen explosions had occurred within two hours.
- 24 June – In London, several bombs exploded following or preceding a demonstration (under police protection) in honour of Wolfe Tone. The banners the marchers carried demanded the release of IRA members who had been arrested by the British police.
- 24 June – London branches of the Midland Bank, Westminster Bank and Lloyds Bank were targeted with a series of massive explosions. London police carried out mass arrests; interrogations of the Irish community in Britain with the majority being released soon after.

Sir Samuel Hoare, introduced the Prevention of Violence Bill (Temporary Provisions). The bill provided comprehensive powers for the British government to prevent the immigration of foreigners, for their deportation, and for extending to the Irish the requirement to register with the British police. Hoare referred to the S-Plan of the IRA when presenting the bill to the British parliament. He also stated that a total of 127 attacks had been perpetrated since January 1939, 57 in London and 70 in the provinces. In the course of these one person had been killed and 55 seriously or less seriously injured. 66 persons had been convicted of "terrorist activity". In all, Hoare repeated that the British police had seized; 55 sticks of gelignite, 1,000 detonators, 2 tons of potassium chlorate & oxide of iron, 7 gallons of sulphuric acid and 4 cwt of aluminum powder.
Hoare explained that up to the present the perpetrators of these attacks had restricted themselves to damaging British property, however recently the government had been notified that the campaign was about to intensify with no regard being paid to human life. He added that the IRA campaign "was being closely watched and actively stimulated by foreign organisations" (a reference to German Intelligence). Hoare went on to claim that the IRA had come within an inch of blowing up Hammersmith Bridge, Southwark Power Station, and an aqueduct in North London. They had collected detailed information about important bridges, railway lines, munition dumps, war factories and airfields and even engaged in a plan to blow up the Houses of Parliament.

==== July ====
- 3 July – Seven bombs went off in railway stations in the Midlands. Nottingham, Leicester, Warwick, Derby, Birmingham, Coventry and Stafford were bombed, with bombs left in waiting rooms and luggage offices overnight. Nobody was seriously injured. In Leicester, a bomb exploded in the ticket collector's cabin of the railway station on London Road. Extensive damage was caused to the station concourse.
- 26 July – In London, bombs exploded in the left-luggage area of King's Cross and the cloakroom of Victoria stations. At Victoria, five people, cloakroom attendants and porters, were wounded and the station clock was shattered; at King's Cross, a large hole was blown in the cloakroom floor, one man lost both legs and later died, and 17 people were severely wounded. Following these attacks, the draft Prevention of Violence legislation in the British parliament was speeded up: the bill received its second and third readings in the House of Lords on 28 July; it was disposed of in five minutes on its second reading and the third was waived.
- 27 July – In or near Liverpool there were three explosions. The first bomb, at Maghull, blew up a swing bridge spanning the Leeds and Liverpool Canal. The wreckage of the bridge fell into the canal, with the result that all barge traffic was halted. The second bomb completely wrecked the front and large sections of the inside of a post office in the centre of Liverpool. The third bomb went off in a park. No injuries were reported.

==== August onwards ====
- 3 August – IRA announced that it would continue its campaign against Britain for another two-and-a-half years. From August onwards, deportations of Irish from Britain increased under the Prevention of Violence Act 1939 (Temporary Provisions).
- 14 August – Sean Russell issues a defiant speech against Britain: "The bombing by our army will continue. No concession can be got from England except by use of arms...As for de Valera and the Irish Parliament, they're compromisers. They deal with the enemy. But our fight is not with them. It is with the British. The bombings will certainly continue".
- 25 August – 1939 Coventry bombing – 5 dead, 70 injured. Two bombs also went off in Liverpool: at Lloyds Bank in Victoria Street and on Stanley Street.
- 26 August – In Blackpool bombs went off outside a Town Hall and at nearby business premises. An explosive device was found in the forecourt of a police station, also in Blackpool. An explosion also went off near a first aid post in Dovecot, Liverpool. At night Christopher Kenneally was arrested after a bomb he was carrying went off prematurely.
- 28 August – Two pillar boxes were blown up in Liverpool, there were no casualties or injuries.
- 29 August – Wires of a dozen telephone kiosks were cut, assumed to be IRA activity.
- 3 September – The Emergency Powers Act was enacted as the United Kingdom declared war on Germany.
- October – Russell made a speech which has been interpreted as attempting to shore up flagging belief IRA members had in the effectiveness the S-Plan was having: " 'England's difficulty – Ireland's opportunity' has ever been the watchword of the Gael.. Now is the time for Irishmen to take up arms and strike a blow for the Ulster people."
- 18 November – There were four explosions at business premises in London. Two other bombs were discovered and neutralized.
- 24 November – Two police boxes and two telephone kiosks were damaged by explosions.
- 28 November – There were two explosions in Southampton.
- 11 December – Trial opened in Birmingham of three men and two women indicted for murder as a result of the bombing of Coventry on 25 August 1939. The accused were
  - 29-year-old labourer Joseph Hewitt,
  - 29-year-old labourer James McCormick (alias of Richards),
  - 22-year-old Mary Hewitt,
  - 49-year-old Brigid O'Hara and
  - 32-year-old clerk Peter Barnes.

The Hewitts were a married couple and Bridgid O'Hara was Mrs. Hewitt's mother. All pleaded not guilty to the charge of murdering 21-year-old Elsie Ansell (the prosecution had limited the charge to one victim). Three days later, the verdict of guilty was returned for McCormick (Richards) and Barnes, who were sentenced to death by hanging. The sentencing triggered a series of IRA attacks on British post offices, postboxes and mail trains in Birmingham, Wolverhampton, Crewe and London.

=== 1940 ===
- 5 February – All over Ireland there were demonstrations and resolutions of protest against the executions of the bombers. De Valera appealed for a reprieve. The New York Times analysed Irish public opinion so:
  Opinion here is either that 2 innocent men will hang, or that it is the partition of Ireland by the British who forced these young Irishmen to perpetrate such outrages. Anglo-Irish relations could markedly deteriorate through the hanging of these men.
- 6 February – There were three explosions in mailbags, two in Euston Station, London, one in the GPO on Hill Street, Birmingham. This attack was regarded by The Times as a reprisal for the failure to reprieve Barnes and McCormick (Richards).
- 7 February – McCormick (Richards) (29) and Barnes (32) were both hanged at Birmingham Prison. Many protests followed this. Simon Donnelly, former IRA leader, made a speech in Dublin in which he proclaimed, to the crowd's jubilation:
  We know very well what outcome we want to this war. We want the enemy, who has kept our people in bondage for 700 years and who continues to pour insults on us, to be pitilessly vanquished. Until such time as the Irish Republic is established, Ireland's youth will continue to sacrifice itself. If the government does not bring foreign overlordship to an end, others must be entrusted with the task.
- 14 February – In Birmingham, five bombs exploded.
- 22 February – A large explosion occurred at a bus stop on Oxford Street, London seriously injuring seven people.
- 23 February
  - The Times reported that since being enacted, the Temporary Provisions legislation had led to the expulsion of 119 people from Britain.
  - Two explosions occurred in the West End, London. The devices had been placed in refuse bins. Thirteen people were injured.
- 6 March – A bomb was set off at Park Lane Bank and in King's Inn Road in London.
- 17 March – There was an explosion near Paddington Town Hall.
- 18 March – Bomb explodes on a rubbish dump in London. No injuries.
- 5 May – Nazi agent Hermann Goertz is parachuted into Ireland and was sheltered by Seamus O’Donovan.

== Involvement of German Abwehr ==
It is unlikely that the German Intelligence Abwehr I & II had any input into the formation of the S-plan and it was not until the bombing campaign opened that German intelligence took any real interest in the IRA. Interest in the S-Plan did become a feature of subsequent IRA/Abwehr contact following the British declaration of war on Germany in 1939. According to a 1939 discussion between Jim O'Donovan and Abwehr Director, "Dr. Pfalzgraf", (Captain Friedrich Carl Marwede Director of Office I West in Abwehr II, Berlin), the point of the S-plan was, "a final fight with England, whereby it was hoped to force the British to negotiations on the question of re-unification." O'Donovan made four visits to Germany to discuss the possibility of acquiring German arms and wireless equipment for the IRA.

There is solid evidence from the Abwehr war diaries that methods employed by IRA units carrying out the S-Plan generated only annoyance and frustration in Germany. Attacks against mostly civilian targets, while causing panic and loss of confidence in the authorities, were not perceived as helpful to damaging British capability for waging war.

Evidence of German Intelligence's frustration can also be seen in the message from Abwehr II's Director which was hand delivered to Seamus O'Donovan on 9 February 1940 by Abwehr agent Ernst Weber-Drohl:

"The Pfalzgraf Section very urgently requests its Irish friends and IRA members to be so good as to make considerably better efforts to carry out the S-plan, which they received some time last summer, and to be more effectual against military as opposed to civilian objectives."

By the time of Russell's journey back to Ireland in August 1940, German Intelligence chief Wilhelm Canaris appears to have lost faith in attempts to infiltrate England via Ireland.

Despite German interest in receiving military intelligence from the IRA relating to Britain and Northern Ireland, the IRA's performance in relation to this has been described by Eunan O'Halpin as "derisory". Cecil Liddell, head of MI5's Irish section, wrote "no single case of espionage or sabotage by the IRA or by the Germans through the IRA is known to have occurred". A fourteen-page survey of damage to Belfast caused by German bombing raids from April 1941 to May 1941, titled "Comprehensive Military Report on Belfast" was produced by the IRA. This report detailed damage, identified industrial targets which had not been damaged, and included a map which was marked with "the remaining and most outstanding objects of military significance as yet unblitzed by the Luftwaffe". The document was discovered in October 1941 when a courier was arrested in Dublin, it does not appear to have reached Germany.

== Significance of the S-Plan ==
The five deaths during the Coventry bombing on 25 August effectively ended the campaign. By late 1940 the introduction of the Treason Act 1939 and the Offences Against the State Act in Ireland, and the Prevention of Violence (Temporary Provisions) Act in Britain had seen many IRA members interned in Ireland, arrested in Britain, or deported from Britain. In all, 119 people were deported, 14 people were prevented from entering Britain and 21 people were obliged to register with the police. The granting of extra powers to the Irish Justice Minister under the Emergency Powers Act in January 1940 led to 600 IRA volunteers being imprisoned and 500 interned during the course of World War II alone.

In June 1940 Time reported that:

"Since 1938 its [the IRA's] 7,500 youthful members (plus 15,000 fellow travelers) have followed the wild-eyed, bomb-Britain policy of 46-year-old, super-radical Chieftain Sean Russell. There is reason to believe that the intransigent I.R.A.-sters are getting money from the Nazis, mostly by way of the U.S."

Increases in the security surrounding important infrastructure targets in Britain also had a major effect on IRA team's ability to conduct operations. The seizure of war material and inability to get newly acquired war material into Britain under wartime restrictions meant increased improvisation, which in turn led to increased exposure to discovery. It is also clear that the campaign generated a good deal of anti-Irish sentiment, which increased the British public's suspicion of Irish people in general. All these factors led to attacks tapering off around early to mid-1940. The death of Seán Russell on 14 August 1940, (he had already been effectively incommunicado since April 1939), and the succession of Stephen Hayes as IRA Chief of Staff also contributed to the petering out of the attacks

At the time, the author of the S-Plan, Seamus O'Donovan noted his views on the S-Plan campaign in his diary entry for 23 August 1939 as:

"hastily conceived, scheduled to a premature start, with ill-equipped and inadequately-trained personnel, too few men and too little money.... ..unable to sustain the vital spark of what must be confessed to have fizzled out like a damp and inglorious squib"

Reflecting in the 1960s, O'Donovan assessed the results of the campaign even more critically:

"It brought nothing but harm to Ireland and the IRA."

M.L.R Smith writing in Fighting for Ireland? The military strategy of the Irish Republican movement, argued that the S-Plan campaign:

"..can be seen not as a serious attempt to advance the nationalist cause, but as a sign of the movement reverting to type, as a vehicle for preserving the doctrinal purity of the republican vision. The bombing campaign underscored that a 'militarist caste' was exactly what the IRA had become."

The main outcome of the campaign was the Prevention of Violence Act in Britain, which remained in force until 1954. The Bill gave the UK's Home Secretary powers to exclude and deport persons who were suspected of being connected with the IRA, or to make them register with the police. Special checks were imposed on Irish workers in arms factories and military facilities. In all, 119 people were deported to Ireland and dozens more were registered with the police or were prevented from entering Britain. Between 1940 and 1946 almost one thousand IRA members were interned or jailed in the Southern Irish State. Six men were executed, three died on hunger strike, several were killed in gun battles. Allowed to expire in 1953 and repealed in 1973, it was reintroduced in 1974 as the Prevention of Terrorism (Temporary Provisions) Act to combat the successor to the S-Plan: Provisional IRA attacks on British soil. At least one prisoner died of abusive treatment (on 7 July 1942 IRA Volunteer Terrence Perry, aged 23 of Belfast, who had been active in the S-Plan died in Parkhurst Prison on the Isle of Wight).

== See also ==
- Fenian Dynamite Campaign
- Northern Campaign
- Border Campaign
- Christmas Raid
- Irish Republican Army – Abwehr collaboration in World War II
