= James McCormick (Irish republican) =

Irish republican (1910–1940)

James McCormick (1910 - 7 February 1940) was born in Mullingar, County Westmeath, Ireland and joined the Irish Republican Army (IRA) in Tullamore, County Offaly. He was executed for his role in the 1939 Coventry bombing, which killed five civilians and injured seventy others.

== Sabotage campaign in England (S-Plan) ==
In early 1939, McCormick volunteered for active service with the IRA in England under the alias of James Richards. The Richards alias was effective - many records, news articles, government archives and books still refer to McCormick as Richards or McCormack. McCormick served for some time as an IRA Operations Officer in London and Birmingham before being posted to Coventry in May 1939. By August 1939, he was assigned as Officer Commanding the IRA unit in Coventry. Between February and August 1939 there were over a dozen arson and bombing attacks in Coventry.

James McCormick along with Peter Barnes participated in the 1939 Coventry bombing which was part of the IRA's sabotage campaign in England (the S-Plan). During the campaign there were 300 explosions/acts of sabotage, 10 deaths and 96 injuries. On 25 August 1939 the IRA was responsible for the bombing of the busy Broadgate area of Coventry which killed five and injured 70 people. The large number of civilian deaths and wounded effectively ended the IRA's eight month sabotage campaign.

Although McCormick and Barnes admitted constructing the Coventry bomb, another IRA man (Jobie Sullivan) stated that he planted the bomb and that McCormick and Barnes were innocent.

== Trial and execution ==
On 11 December 1939 the trial opened in Birmingham before Mr Justice Singleton and a jury. Three days later, the verdict of guilty was returned. James McCormick (Richards) and Peter Barnes were sentenced to death. Just before being sentenced McCormick made a statement: "As a soldier of the Irish Republican Army, I am not afraid to die, as I am doing it for a just cause. I say in conclusion, God bless Ireland and God bless the men who have fought and died for her. Thank you my lord." The sentencing triggered a series of IRA attacks on British post offices, postboxes and mail trains in Birmingham, Wolverhampton, Crewe, and London. McCormick also wrote a letter to his sister, Margaret Rita McCormack in Mullingar (his parents had died) Margaret's son recalled the moment Margaret received the letter, running into the street and screaming with grief and horror, the letter was as follows:

This is my farewell letter, as I have been just told that I have to die in the morning. I knew that I would have to die, so the news did not come as a great shock to me, but thank God that I am prepared, as I know I am dying for a just cause. I shall walk out tomorrow morning smiling, as I shall be thinking of God and of the good men who went before me for the same cause.

On 7 February 1940 Barnes and McCormick were hanged simultaneously at Winson Green Prison in Birmingham. Both Barnes and McCormick were buried in the prison grounds.

== Reaction in Ireland and burial ==
Many apolitical Irish people felt that since McCormick or Barnes were not directly responsible for the Coventry bombing they should not be executed for that crime. As their appeals failed there was growing anger in Ireland. On 5 February 1940 five thousand people protested the sentences in Dublin. In Cork city a crowd of thousands gathered to hear an address on the fate of McCormick and Barnes from the well known IRA leader Tom Barry. The day after their execution, Ireland went into a day of mourning, flags flew at half staff, theatres and cinemas closed, sporting events were cancelled and Masses were offered for the repose of souls of McCormick and Barnes.

In 1969 their bodies were disinterred, repatriated to Ireland and both were re-interred in Ballyglass Cemetery, Mullingar. The re-interment of McCormick and Barnes on 6 July 1969 was attended by an estimated 15,000 people.
