= Ernst Weber-Drohl =

Ernst Weber Drohl (1879-?) was a professional wrestler, strongman performer, and German Abwehr agent during World War 2.

Born near Edelbach in Austria, he became a travelling performer using the name "Atlas the Strong" and toured extensively in America and Ireland. His knowledge of Ireland and the English language drew the attention of the Abwehr in Nuremberg. In early 1940 he was selected to deliver money, a radio transmitter and instructions to the IRA. He was landed on the Irish coast by the submarine U-37 at Killala in County Mayo on 8 February. His rubber dinghy capsized on the way to shore, causing the loss of the transmitter. He succeeded in meeting his contact Seamus O'Donovan at Killiney in Dublin.

On 24 April 1940 he was apprehended in Ireland for illegal entry. He was released from the District court only to be rearrested under the Emergency Powers Act and confined to prison where he went on hunger strike and was released 8 days later. Arrested finally in 1942 he spent the rest of the war in Mountjoy prison and Athlone internment camp where he was interned with other German spies including Hermann Goertz.
