= Peter Barnes (Irish republican) =

Peter Barnes (6 May 1907 – 7 February 1940) was an Irish republican. He was born in Banagher, King's County (Offaly). As a young man Barnes joined Fianna Éireann (an Irish nationalist youth organisation) and in 1924 became a member of the Irish Republican Army (IRA).

== Sabotage campaign in England - the S-Plan ==
Barnes, along with James McCormick (also known as James Richards), were convicted of participating in the 1939 Coventry bombing, which was part of the IRA's sabotage campaign in England (the S-Plan). The Coventry bombing killed five people on 25 August 1939. Barnes was arrested on that date in London. During the search of his room police discovered the address of his fiancée. At her address (also in London), police found receipts for materials associated with bomb making. Although he and McCormick admitted constructing the bomb, which was intended to be used to destroy a power station, they claimed not to be involved in planting the bomb. Another IRA man (Joseph "Joby" O'Sullivan) claimed that he planted the bomb and that Barnes and McCormick were innocent.

== Trial and execution ==
From the moment of his arrest until the moment of his hanging Peter Barnes protested his innocence. Barnes was associated with the buying of flour bags that were used to mix and carry explosives but did not know where the bombs were to be used. Both Barnes and McCormick were found guilty under the rule of Common purpose which takes into account how a joint criminal enterprise results in death. On the night before his execution, he wrote a letter to his sister stating: "I am an innocent man and as I have said before, it will be known yet that I am. The only thing that worries me now is the thought of my poor father and mother, but I know God will comfort them." Seán MacBride, a former Chief-of-Staff for the IRA and Irish barrister, attempted to secure their release claiming they were being illegally held without a writ of habeas corpus. Also charged with murder along with James McCormick were Brigid O'Hara, Joseph and Mary Hewitt, all five pleaded not guilty before the court at Birmingham Assizes. Brigid O'Hara issued statements between 28 August and 4 September to Scotland Yard and Birmingham police denying any knowledge of the bombings, and later provided evidence for the prosecution.

On 15 December 1939 the jury deliberated for 31 minutes before finding both Barnes and McCormick guilty of murder. They were sentenced to death by Mr Justice Singleton. On 7 February 1940 Barnes and McCormick were hanged simultaneously at Winson Green Prison in Birmingham.

== Reaction in Ireland and reburial ==
Their trial and execution resulted in a public outcry in Ireland against Neville Chamberlain and the British Government as Peadar O'Donnell and other prominent Irish writers signed a petition campaigning for leniency towards the condemned men. The executions provoked a wave of protests and marches throughout Ireland, Irish flags were flown at half-mast and, through the intervention of a sympathizer, at the World's Fair in New York. On the day of the executions of Barnes and McCormick many Irish cinemas were shut as a sign of respect. The bodies of Barnes and McCormick were buried in the prison yard and in 1969, their remains were released to relatives and were flown to Dublin. Their re-interment on 6 July 1969 in Ballyglass Cemetery, Mullingar was attended by an estimated 15,000 people.
