= Seamus O'Donovan =

Irish republican and Nazi agent (1896–1979)

- Séamus Ó Donnabháin
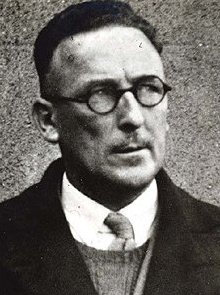
- James O'Donovan after an arrest in 1941
- Born: James O'Donovan; 3 November 1896; County Roscommon, Ireland
- Died: 4 June 1979 (aged 82); Dublin, Ireland
- Other name: Jim O'Donovan
- Occupation: Volunteer in the Irish Republican Army
- Known for: Contacts with the Nazi Abwehr
- Political party: Córas na Poblachta
- Children: Gerard O'Donovan (son) Donal K. O’Donovan (son) Sheila Hannah (daughter) Aedine Santa (daughter) Mary ODonovan (daughter)

James O'Donovan (Irish: Séamus Ó Donnabháin; 3 November 1896 – 4 June 1979), also known as Seamus or Jim O'Donovan, was a leading volunteer in the Irish Republican Army (IRA) and agent in Ireland for the Abwehr. He fought in the Irish War of Independence and then on the Anti-Treaty side during the Irish Civil War serving as the IRA Director of Munitions and chemicals. O'Donovan is best known for his contacts with the Abwehr intelligence of Nazi Germany.

== Biography ==
=== Irish Republican Army ===
A native of County Roscommon, O'Donovan was educated at St Aloysius' College, Glasgow and at University College Dublin where he earned a Master of Science degree in Chemistry. O'Donovan was an explosives expert and reputedly invented the "Irish War Flour" (named after the flour sacks in which it was smuggled into Dublin aboard ships) and "Irish Cheddar" devices. He subsequently became IRA Director of Chemicals in 1921. During the Irish War of Independence he was imprisoned in Mountjoy and Kilmainham prisons and later interned in Newbridge, County Kildare. O'Donovan escaped from Newbridge jail on 14 October 1922 was recaptured on 15 March 1923 and imprisoned until 17 July 1924.

He opposed the Anglo-Irish Treaty and was a member of the anti-treaty IRA Executive formed in 1922. During the Irish Civil War O'Donovan fought on the Anti-Treaty IRA side.

In 1930, he became a manager at Irelands Electricity Supply Board (ESB) headquarters in Dublin.

In August 1938, at the request of IRA chief of staff Seán Russell, he wrote the S-Plan, a sabotage/bombing campaign targeting England. The S-Plan campaign carried out approximately 300 explosions/acts of sabotage, caused 10 deaths and 96 injuries in England. During this time O'Donovan and Russell were the only General Headquarters members of the "Old IRA" still in the organisation.

In his unpublished memoirs he wrote that he "conducted the entire training of cadre units, was responsible for all but locally-derived intelligence, carried out small pieces of research and, in general, controlled the whole explosives and munitions end" of S-Plan.

=== Involvement with Abwehr and Internment ===
As "Agent V-Held", he visited Germany three times in 1939 on behalf of the IRA.

On 28 February, he negotiated an arms and radio equipment delivery at the Abwehrstelle in Hamburg. On 26 April he concluded a new arms deal with the Abwehrstelle and established, with the help of a Breton, a secret courier connection to Ireland via France. On 23 August, O'Donovan received the last instructions for the event of war.

On 9 February 1940, Abwehr II agent Ernst Weber-Drohl landed at Killala Bay, County Sligo aboard U-37. He was equipped with a 'Ufa' transmitter, cash, and instructions for O'Donovan (who by this time was the chief IRA contact for Abwehr I/II). The transmitter was lost upon landing, but when Weber-Drohl reached O'Donovan at Shankill, Killiney, County Dublin, he was able to deliver new transmission codes, $14,450 in cash, and a message from "Pfalzgraf Section" asking that the IRA concentrate its S-Plan attacks on military rather than civilian targets.

O'Donovan became increasingly enamoured of Nazi ideology during this time, and visited Germany three times. In 1942, O'Donovan wrote an article arguing that Ireland's future lay in an alliance with a victorious Germany and attacked Britain and the United States for being "centres of Freemasonry, international financial control and Jewry". Long after the pact with the Germans fell apart, O'Donovan continued to express his sympathy for the Nazi regime. His son, Gerard O'Donovan, recalled that every Saturday night a visitor would come to the family home and send messages to Germany.

In 1940, he was involved in setting up Córas na Poblachta, a short-lived fringe political party formed in 1941 by IRA members opposed to what they saw as "de Valera's collaboration with Britain".

During The Emergency O'Donovan was interned under the Emergency Powers Act 1939 at Curragh Camp (between October 1941 and September 1943).

=== Death ===
O'Donovan died in Dublin on 4 June 1979, aged 82.
