= Colm Murphy =

Alleged member of the Real IRA (1952–2023)

- Born: 18 August 1952; Belleeks, County Armagh
- Died: 18 April 2023 (aged 70); Drogheda, County Louth, Ireland

Colm Murphy (18 August 1952 – 18 April 2023) was an Irish republican who was the first person to be convicted in connection with the Omagh bombing, but whose conviction was overturned on appeal. While awaiting a retrial on criminal charges, Murphy was found liable for the bombing in a civil trial, along with Michael McKevitt, Liam Campbell and Seamus Daly. He was subsequently cleared of criminal charges in February 2010.

== Background ==
Born in Belleeks, County Armagh, on 18 August 1952, Murphy was an active Irish republican paramilitary from his late teens. In March 1972, he was arrested in Dundalk regarding an assault, and was sentenced to two years in prison after the Garda Síochána found a loaded revolver in his car. Murphy was imprisoned in the Curragh military jail but escaped in October 1972, and was not recaptured until May 1973. In June 1976, he was imprisoned again, receiving a three-year sentence for firearms offences and a one-year sentence for Provisional Irish Republican Army membership, both sentences to run concurrently. In July 1983, Murphy was arrested in the US, after attempting to buy a consignment of M60 machine guns to be shipped to Ireland for use by the Irish National Liberation Army. He received a five-year prison sentence, but returned to Ireland in December 1985 after being released early.

In the late 1980s, Murphy began investing in property, and formed a company named Emerald Enterprises in 1990. He bought the Emerald Bar public house in Dundalk for IR£100,000, and it later became a meeting place for dissident republicans. Other investments included 30 acres (120,000 m^{2}) of land in Drogheda bought for IR£52,000 in 1995, and his company won contracts for an IR£11 million development at Dublin City University and the multi-million pound International Financial Services Centre in Dublin's docklands.

== Dissident republican activity ==
Murphy was arrested by the Gardaí on 21 February 1999 for questioning under anti-terrorist legislation. On 24 February, Murphy became the first person charged in connection with the Omagh bombing, when he appeared before Dublin's Special Criminal Court and was charged with conspiring to cause an explosion under the terms of Ireland's Offences Against the State Act, between 13 and 16 August 1998. Murphy was also charged with membership of an illegal organisation, the Real Irish Republican Army.

On 10 October 2000, the BBC television show Panorama named Murphy as one of four people connected with the Omagh bombing, along with Seamus Daly and Liam Campbell. In 2001, Murphy undertook legal action against the BBC and Daily Mail publishers Associated Newspapers for contempt of court. The action against Associated Newspapers was settled on 31 July 2001, and the newspaper released a statement saying Murphy was entitled to be presumed innocent of the charges against him until proven guilty.

Murphy's trial began at Special Criminal Court in Dublin on 12 October 2001. The court heard that Murphy had supplied two mobile phones which were used during the bombing. One witness, Murphy's second cousin, retracted his evidence and the judge called the conduct of two detectives outrageous, saying they had persistently lied under cross-examination. Despite this, on 22 January 2002, Murphy was convicted of conspiring to cause the Omagh bombing, and on 25 January was sentenced to 14 years imprisonment with the judge describing him as a long-time republican extremist.

On 21 January 2005, Murphy's conviction was overturned and a new trial ordered, due to the invasion of Murphy's presumption of innocence, and alteration of Gardaí interview notes and evidence presented by two officers. A week later, Murphy's legal case against the BBC was resolved, with the BBC issuing a statement that Murphy "was fully entitled to maintain his innocence of the charges against him and to test the evidence against him at his trial".

On 23 October 2006, two Gardaí officers were found not guilty of perjuring themselves during Murphy's trial. On 23 May 2007, it was announced that Murphy was suffering from short-term memory loss resulting from a car accident in 1988. His lawyers attempted to prevent a retrial taking place, on the grounds that his condition interfered with his right to a fair hearing. The Court of Criminal Appeal was scheduled to hear his case again in October 2008. Following a retrial held in January 2010, Murphy was acquitted on 24 February 2010.

In 2009, Murphy was one of four men found by a civil court to be liable for the Omagh bombing in a case taken by relatives of the victims. On 7 July 2011, in Belfast High Court, Lord Justice Malachy Higgins directed a retrial of the civil claims against Murphy. He questioned evidence surrounding emails from US undercover agent David Rupert while overturning the judgment on Murphy. The paucity of the email evidence, the lack of consistency in the emails or at least ambiguity, the possibility of initials referring to someone other than Murphy and the fact that they refer on occasions to double hearsay considerably weakened the emails as evidence, he said. Following a civil retrial, on 20 March 2013, Murphy and Seamus Daly were found liable for involvement in the bombing.

== Death ==
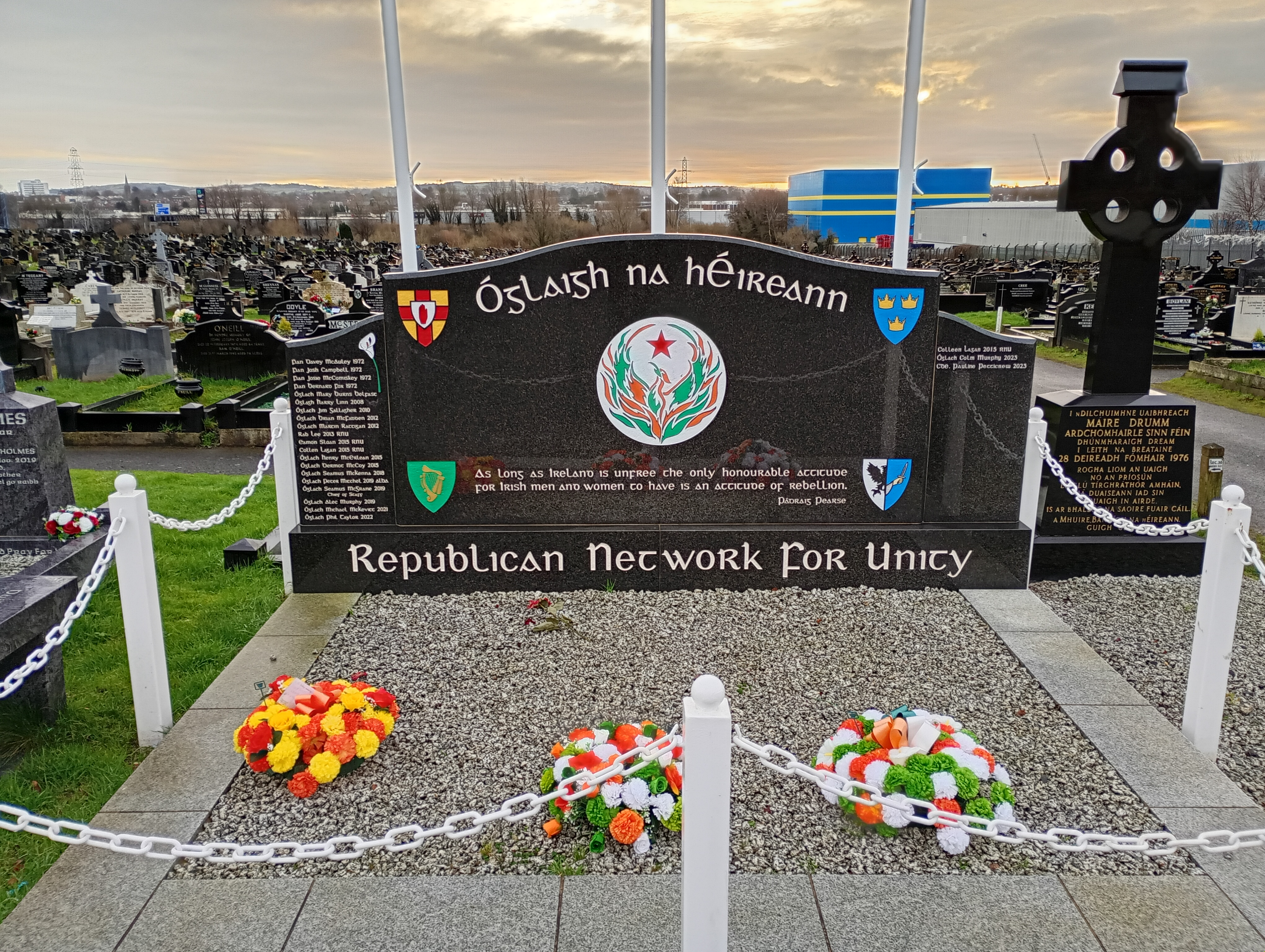
Murphy appears on the Republican Network for Unity memorial in Milltown Cemetery, Belfast

Murphy died from degenerative lung disease at Our Lady of Lourdes Hospital in Drogheda on 18 April 2023, aged 70.
