= Harry White (Irish republican) =

Irish republican paramilitary

Chief of Staff of the IRA
- In office 1944–1945
- Preceded by: Charlie Kerins
- Succeeded by: Patrick Fleming

Personal details
- Born: 1916
- Died: April 1989 (appr. 73 years of age)

Military service
- Branch/service: Irish Republican Army (1922–1969)

Harry White (1916 – April 1989) was an Irish republican paramilitary. Between 1935 and 1941 White was arrested multiple times and imprisoned in Crumlin Road Jail, Mountjoy Jail, Arbour Hill Prison and the Curragh Camp.

== Early life ==
Born in Belfast, White worked as a plumber, and joined the Irish Republican Army (IRA) at an early age, being imprisoned several times during the 1930s. He travelled to England to take part in the IRA's "S-Plan" bombing campaign of 1939 to 1940, then returned to Dublin to pass his bomb-making skills onto new recruits, including Brendan Behan. He then returned to become the IRA's Manchester Operations Officer but, after a bomb he was working on went off in the flat he was renting, he fled to Glasgow, then back to Ireland.

== The IRA in the 1940s ==
Shortly after returning to Ireland, White was arrested while giving a lecture on explosives in County Offaly, and was interned at the Curragh Camp. The republican prisoners were split into two groups, one led by Pearse Kelly, and the other by Liam Leddy. White was unhappy with the situation and refused to take sides. Shortly after his arrival, IRA Chief of Staff Seán McCool was also interned, and was concerned that the locations of many of the IRA's arms caches were known only to him. He asked White to get the information to the new leadership, by "signing out": declaring that he was no longer involved with a paramilitary group. White refused as doing so would be breaking IRA orders, but McCool persisted, suggesting that he could resign from the army before signing out, thereby not contravening IRA rules. Once released, he immediately rejoined the IRA and passed on the information; he was also made IRA Quartermaster General by Chief of Staff Charlie Kerins. However, he was suspected of involvement in the killing of a police officer, Dinny O'Brien, something which he always denied, and had to go on the run.

In October 1942, White and a comrade Maurice O'Neill were cornered in a house. Here the details are unclear; Tim Pat Coogan claimed that he was in a house in Donnycarney in County Dublin with Maurice O'Neill (executed in Mountjoy Prison on 12 November 1942), while Danny Morrison claims that he was at a wedding reception in Cavan with Paddy Dermody. Both agree that there was a shoot-out followed in which one officer was killed (Detective George Mordaunt), enabling White to escape, but he fell down a railway embankment and hid for two days before emerging, hoping that the police hunt was over. In Coogan's version, he caught a bus to Dublin, covered in blood and mud; while, according to Morrison, he was assisted by a sympathetic soldier who helped him recover and cycled to Dublin with him. They agree that he reached a safe house once in the capital. Morrison claims that the Donnycarney shootout occurred four months later and that White travelled north, rather than returning to Dublin a second time.

On arrival in the north, White was made Officer Commanding the IRA Northern Command. Kerins was arrested in Dublin in June 1944, and later tried for murder and hanged. White became the only member of the IRA leadership still free. A wanted man, he travelled around until work was arranged for him by supporters in Altaghoney. There, he worked as a handyman and barber and set up a dance band, also managing to acquire some explosives from a local Royal Ulster Constabulary (RUC) officer who wanted rocks clearing from his field. For at least part of his time in Altaghoney, White served as the IRA Chief of Staff.

White was finally captured by the RUC Special Branch and tried in October 1946, and was handed over to the southern Irish authorities; he was sentenced to death, but this was reduced to twelve years' imprisonment on appeal, a defence in which his former comrade Seán MacBride was involved. He was actually released early in 1948 following a change in government (a coalition between the Fianna Fáil and republican minded party Clann na Poblachta) which left Mac Bride in a ministerial post.

== Later life ==
Following his release, White remained active in the IRA, but in a less high-profile way, as he was married and settled in Dublin. He supported the Provisional IRA following its split in 1970, and was involved in smuggling weapons across the border.

White published his autobiography in 1985 – actually ghostwritten by Uinseann MacEoin. Entitled Harry, it attracted press attention for naming the IRA members who killed Kevin O'Higgins, names which Peadar O'Donnell separately confirmed. White's nephew, Danny Morrison, became a prominent Irish republican from the 1970s onwards.
