= Bernadette Sands McKevitt =

Irish republican activist

Bernadette Sands McKevitt (born in November 1958) is an Irish republican activist and a founding member of the 32 County Sovereignty Movement.

== Early life ==
She lived in the mainly loyalist Rathcoole area of Newtownabbey before her family were forced out of their home, when they moved to republican West Belfast. She is the younger sister of Provisional Irish Republican Army (IRA) hunger striker Bobby Sands.

== Personal life ==
Her husband was Michael McKevitt, the Quartermaster General of the Provisional IRA and later a founding member of an anti-Good Friday Agreement splinter group commonly known as the Real Irish Republican Army. The couple had three children together and lived in Dundalk in the Republic of Ireland.

Following the Omagh bombing of 1998, Sands McKevitt received hostile messages while running her printing business in Dundalk, which, as she related, traumatised her and led to her calling a local priest for support. The locals ostensibly forced her and her husband out of business, though both of them strongly denied having anything to do with the attack in Omagh. In March 2001, Sands McKevitt and her husband were arrested by the Gardaí in Dundalk in an investigation on paramilitary activities, but were not charged. In 2003, McKevitt was sentenced to twenty years in prison in the Republic of Ireland, under the Offences Against the State Act; he was released thirteen years later, in early 2016. In June 2009, McKevitt was one of four men found by a civil court to be liable for the Omagh bombing in a case taken by relatives of the victims.

Michael McKevitt died in January 2021 from cancer, which was first diagnosed while he was still in prison, and was buried with the coffin draped in the tricolor but without any paramilitary presence. Subsequent statements by an FBI/MI5 agent planted inside the Real IRA claim that McKevitt was indeed culpable of making the bomb but that it was handed to the Continuity IRA men who were supposed to plant it somewhere else, away from civilians. The agent, David Rupert, living under witness protection in the US, stated that McKevitt was "very upset" with the resulting carnage, though the group subsequently "licked its wounds" and moved on.
