= County Hall, Omagh =

County building in Omagh, Northern Ireland

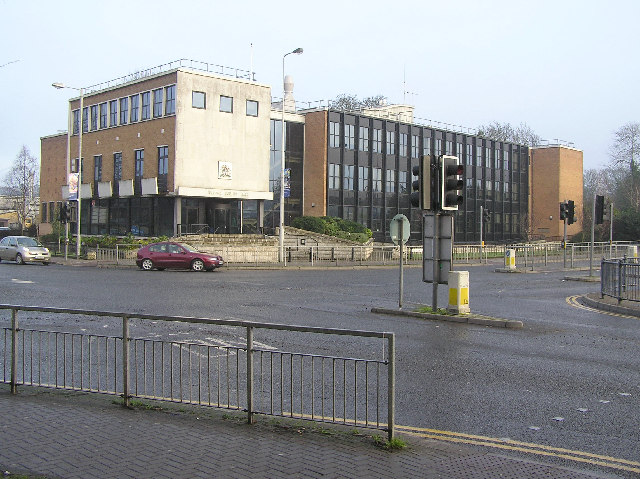
- County Hall, Omagh

- Location within Northern Ireland

General information
- Architectural style: Modern style
- Location: Omagh, County Tyrone, Northern Ireland
- Coordinates: 54.6023°N 7.3010°W
- Completed: 1962

Design and construction
- Architects: Ostick and Williams

County Hall is a municipal facility in Drumragh Avenue, Omagh, County Tyrone, Northern Ireland. It served as the headquarters of Tyrone County Council from 1962 to 1973.

== History ==
During the late 19th century and the first half of the 20th century, meetings of Tyrone County Council were held at the Omagh Courthouse. In the 1960s, county leaders decided that the courthouse was too cramped to accommodate the county council in the context of the county council's increasing administrative responsibilities, especially while the courthouse was still acting as a facility for dispensing justice, and therefore chose to acquire some open land which had previously formed part of the Millbank estate.

The new building, which was designed by Ostick and Williams in the modern style, was completed in 1962. The design for the three-storey building involved an asymmetrical main frontage onto Drumragh Avenue; the left section featured a glass entrance on the ground floor with an entablature above bearing the inscription "Tyrone County Hall" and supporting a wall of concrete panelling displaying the county coat of arms with three small windows above; the right section featured continuous bands of glazing with black panels above and below. A war memorial to soldiers of the Royal Inniskilling Fusiliers who died in the Second Boer War, which had been designed by the sculptor, Sydney March, was relocated from Courthouse Hill to a site within the grounds of the county hall in 1964. Following the bomb attack by the dissident Irish republican paramilitary group, the Real Irish Republican Army, of 15 August 1998, which killed 29 people (including a woman pregnant with twins) and injured some 220 others, a memorial to the victims of the attack was also established within the grounds of the county hall on 15 August 2008.

After the county council was abolished in 1973, the building became the regional office of several government departments. Approximately 113 civil servants, including those employed by the Western Divisional Headquarters of the Department for Infrastructure, were still employed by the Northern Ireland Assembly in the building as at 1 January 2014.
