= Seán Harrington (Chief of Staff) =

Irish republican

Seán Harrington (1912–1978) was an Irish republican who later became Chief of Staff of the Irish Republican Army.

== Biography ==
Harrington was born in Ballyduff, County Kerry in 1912. He joined the Irish Republican Army (IRA) at the age of 16. He later was appointed to the Chief of Staff of the Irish Republican Army.

Harrington served as the IRA's Director of Training and General Headquarters organiser. By 1941, Harrington was a member of the IRA Army Council. In late 1941, the Army Council decided to concentrate efforts in attacking Northern Ireland. At that time Harrington's personal motto was "Leave the South alone. The war is in the North!" He also thought that the unsuccessful bombing and sabotage attacks in England was a "fruitful war" (see the S-Plan). He was present at the court-marshal of former Chief of Staff Stephen Hayes, although he did not personally take part in the trial.

He became Chief of Staff of the IRA in November 1941 when Pearse Kelly was arrested, but he himself was arrested in February 1942. When charged with failing to explain his possession of £50 and refusing to give his details to police, he refused to recognise the Special Criminal Court and was sentenced in March 1942 to two years imprisonment. He was imprisoned in Mountjoy Prison and later transferred to No. 1 Internment Camp at Curragh Camp. Despite being imprisoned he remained Chief of Staff until February 1942, when Seán McCool was selected as his replacement. On his release from the Curragh Harrington married, raised two sons and lived in Dublin. Harrington was described as a "bright, articulate and gentle".

He later lived at Kennelsfort Road, Palmerstown, Dublin and died in November 1978.
