= Liam Campbell =

Alleged volunteer in the Real Irish Republican Army

Liam Campbell is an Irish republican from Dundalk, County Louth. He was found liable under civil proceedings for the 1998 Omagh bombing, which killed 29 people.

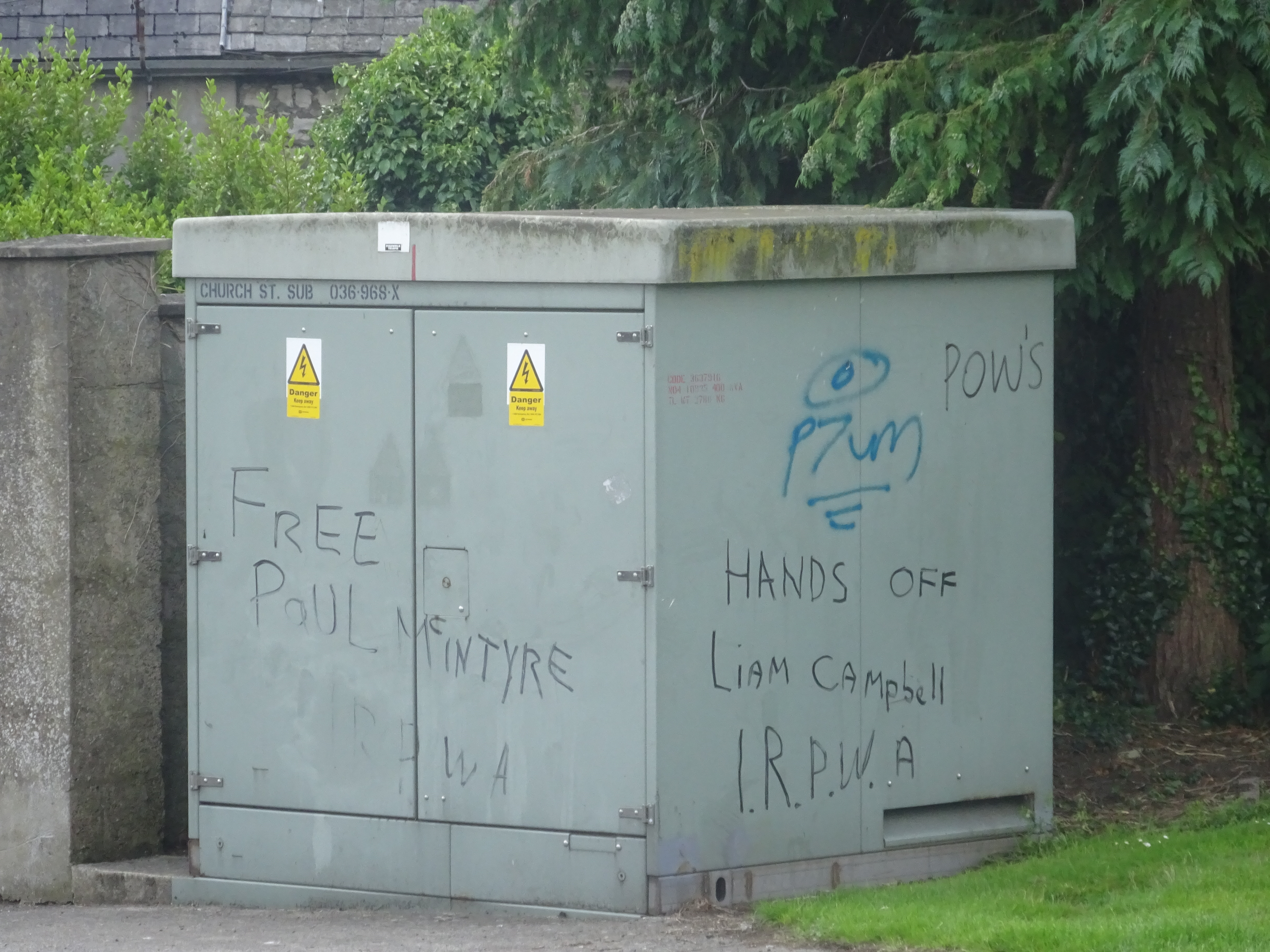
Graffiti in Limerick in support of Campbell

== Family ==
His brother Sean died in December 1975, when a landmine he was preparing for an attack on the British Army exploded prematurely. Another brother, Peter, served 14 years in prison for Provisional Irish Republican Army offenses. Yet another brother, Michael, went on trial in Vilnius, Lithuania, accused of trying to purchase arms and explosives for the Real IRA, was found guilty and sentenced to twelve years in jail, a conviction that was overturned with the defendant acquitted upon the completion of a retrial in 2013, largely due to the defence's argument that Michael was the subject of entrapment, by MI5 agents.

== Paramilitary career ==
Liam Campbell first came to the attention of the British and Irish security forces in the early 1980s and became the subject of an exclusion order in 1983 barring him from entering Northern Ireland.

=== Omagh bombing ===
Campbell was named by the BBC as one of the perpetrators of the 1998 Omagh bombing in a Panorama documentary. He never faced criminal charges but was found liable for the bombing in a civil trial, along with Michael McKevitt, Colm Murphy and Seamus Daly. The case, brought by relatives of the 29 victims, resulted in an award of combined damages of over £1.5m. He was believed to be a member of the Real IRA army council during the bombing. The damages were never paid.

== Imprisonment ==
In May 2004, Campbell was convicted by a court in the Republic of Ireland for membership of the Real IRA and was sentenced to eight years imprisonment. In May 2009, he was arrested following the issue of a European Arrest Warrant at the behest of the Lithuanian authorities, where he was wanted in connection with a gun running plot which saw his brother Michael arrested. Campbell remained in prison for four years and was released in 2013 following the decision of Belfast Recorders Court to deny Campbell's extradition to Lithuania. The court ruled that "[Campbell] was likely to be held in conditions which would be inhuman and degrading." In July 2021, a court in Ireland denied his appeal against extradition to Lithuania for several arms smuggling charges after nearly 12 years of legal battles. In October 2022, the Lithuanian court announced that Campbell was returning home after all charges against him were dropped due to a statute of limitations expiry.
