= Omagh Hospital and Primary Care Complex =

- Western Health and Social Care Trust
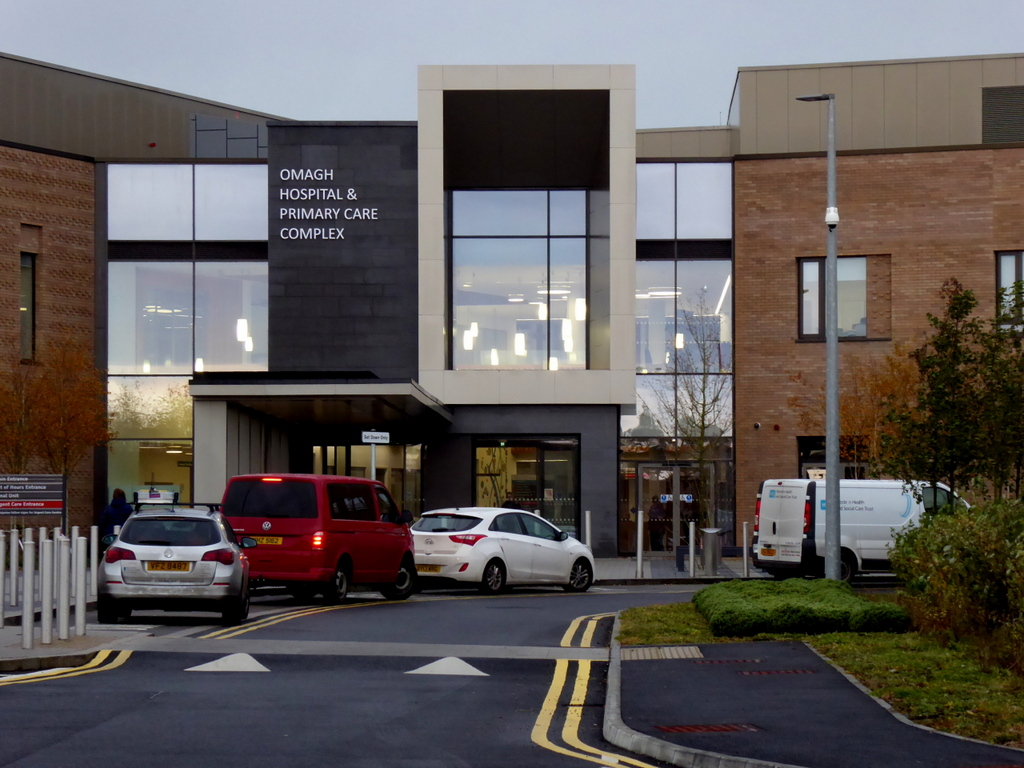
- Entrance to the Omagh Hospital and Primary Care Complex

- Location in Northern Ireland

Geography
- Location: 7 Donaghanie Road, Omagh, County Tyrone, Northern Ireland
- Coordinates: 54.5904°N 7.2675°W

Organisation
- Care system: Health and Social Care

Services
- Emergency department: No
- Beds: 62

History
- Founded: 2017

Links
- Website: Official website

The Omagh Hospital and Primary Care Complex is a local hospital in Omagh, County Tyrone, Northern Ireland. It is managed by the Western Health and Social Care Trust.

== History ==
The hospital is situated in the grounds of the existing Tyrone and Fermanagh Hospital and replaced the old Tyrone County Hospital. It was designed by Todd Architects and built at a cost of £75 million. Its new facilities, which include a 24-hour Urgent Care and Treatment Centre, were opened to patients in June 2017.
