= Erne Hospital =

- Western Health and Social Care Trust
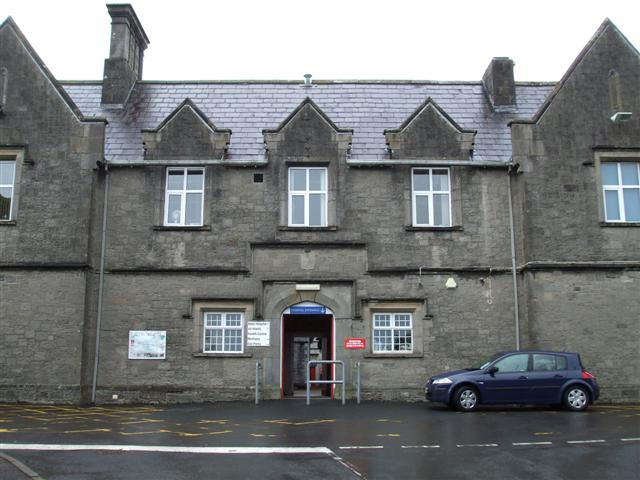
- The old workhouse entrance block at Erne Hospital

- Location in Northern Ireland

Geography
- Location: Cornagrade Road, Enniskillen, Northern Ireland
- Coordinates: 54.3495°N 7.6374°W

Organisation
- Care system: Health and Social Care in Northern Ireland
- Type: Community

History
- Founded: 1844
- Closed: 2012

Erne Hospital was a health facility in Cornagrade Road, Enniskillen, Northern Ireland. It was managed by the Western Health and Social Care Trust.

== History ==
The facility has its origins in the Enniskillen Union Workhouse which was designed by George Wilkinson and was completed in March 1844. After joining the National Health Service as Erne Hospital in 1948, most of the workhouse buildings were demolished in the late 1950s and a modern health facility was completed in 1964. After services transferred to the South West Acute Hospital, Erne Hospital was closed in June 2012 and, although the old workhouse entrance block survived, most of the more modern buildings were demolished in autumn 2016.
