= Éamonn O'Doherty =

Éamonn O'Doherty may refer to:

- Éamonn O'Doherty (Irish republican) (1939–1999), Irish republican
- Éamonn O'Doherty (sculptor) (1939–2011), Irish sculptor
- E. F. O'Doherty, Irish experimental psychologist and Catholic priest
