= David Rupert =

American-British former intelligence agent

David Rupert (born July 27, 1951) is an American former FBI/British intelligence agent whose testimony led to the arrest and prosecution of Michael McKevitt, the reputed leader of the Real IRA, for the Omagh Bombing.

== Testimony ==
Rupert's testimony was crucial in McKevitt being convicted of directing terrorism. In 2006, McKevitt's legal team appealed the conviction based on the defense team not having access to information concerning the tax affairs of Rupert during the original trial. All appeals were denied.

== Award ==
David Rupert was awarded the FBI's Lou Peters Award in 2013.
