= Tyrone County Council =

Local government authority in County Tyrone, Northern Ireland, 1899 to 1973

History
- Founded: 1 April 1899
- Disbanded: 1 October 1973
- Succeeded by: Cookstown District Council; Dungannon and South Tyrone Borough Council; Omagh District Council; Strabane District Council

Meeting place
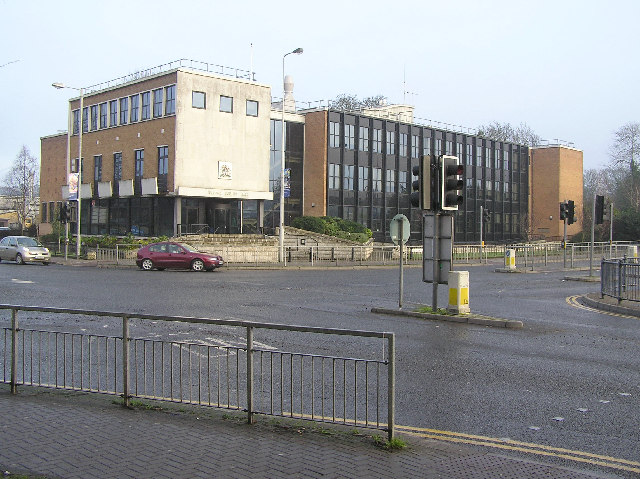
- County Hall, Omagh

Tyrone County Council was the authority responsible for local government in County Tyrone, Northern Ireland, from 1899 to 1973.

== History ==
Tyrone County Council was established on 1 April 1899 under orders issued in accordance with the Local Government (Ireland) Act 1898 for the administrative county of County Tyrone, which succeeded the former judicial county of Tyrone.

The Local Government (Ireland) Act 1919 introduced proportional representation by means of the single transferable vote (PR-STV) for the 1920 Irish local elections. PR-STV was abolished in Northern Ireland under the Local Government Act 1922, with a reversion to first-past-the-post for the 1924 Northern Ireland local elections, the first local elections held in the new jurisdiction.

It was originally based at Omagh Courthouse but moved to County Hall in Omagh in 1962. It was abolished in accordance with the Local Government Act (Northern Ireland) 1972 on 1 October 1973.
