= Eoin McNamee (Irish republican) =

Irish republican

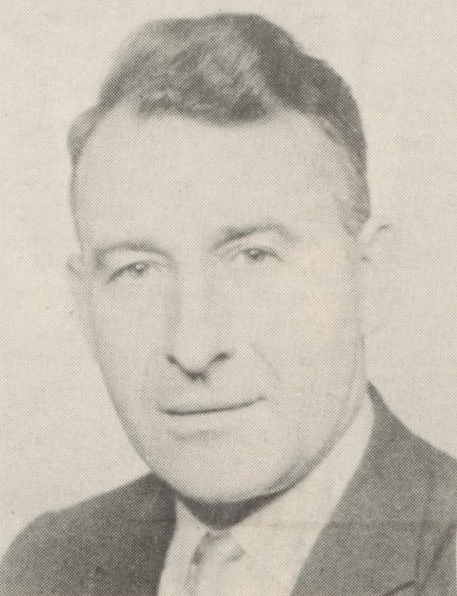

Chief of Staff of the IRA
- In office c. March 1942 – c. May 1942
- Preceded by: Seán McCool
- Succeeded by: Hugh McAteer

Personal details
- Born: 1914
- Died: 9 August 1986 (aged 71–72)

Military service
- Branch/service: Irish Republican Army (1922–1969)
- Battles/wars: S-Plan

Eoin McNamee (1914 – 9 August 1986) was an Irish Republican and Chief of Staff of the Irish Republican Army.

== Background ==
McNamee (MacNamee) is described as having grown up "in the Sperrin Mountains" of County Tyrone and County Londonderry in Ireland, and received little in the way of formal education. A close confidant of McNamee and fellow Irish Republican George Harrison felt McNamee was “A scholarly, astute, and sane man, with clear perception he saw that a successful revolutionary effort had to be fought on all levels, including political and agitation, but he remained totally committed to the view that armed struggle was the cutting edge or the spear of efforts, the key to victory.” McNamee was described as being little shy and often quiet, shunning publicity, always working behind the scenes. Pearse Kelly remembered him as being “a solid indestructible man who seemed to have a rock-like tenacity.”

== Irish Republican Army ==
He joined the Irish Republican Army (IRA) in 1934 Greencastle parish, County Tyrone before emigrating to London. While still in Ireland McNamee took long journeys by bicycle on the narrow mountainous roads of Tyrone and Donegal, resulting in a mass of recruits for the IRA. He was involved in the Republican Congress, an attempt by the far-left in Ireland to form a political party that would be on good terms with the IRA. However, the Republican Congress split between having moderate Republican goals or an explicitly Communist outlook.

Between 1937 and 1939 he lived in England, still operating for the IRA, working as an "intelligence officer". In March and April 1938 he attended IRA conventions in Ireland and was the spokesman for Seán Russell's faction in the voting for a new chief of staff. During this time period he, along with other IRA members based in England, were given a brief introduction into how to create explosives by Seamus O'Donovan and Patrick McGrath (Irish Republican). McNamee supported the 1939–40 IRA sabotage and bombing campaign against targets in England – the S-Plan (also known as the English Campaign). During the campaign there were 300 explosions, 10 deaths and 96 injuries. The explosion at Milverton railway station (3 July 1939) may have been the work of McNamee, as he was based in the west midlands of the UK.

McNamee was recalled to Ireland in April 1939 and on 11 June 1939 he was arrested and charged with being a member of the IRA and sentenced to six months in Crumlin Road Jail, Belfast. He was released in May 1940 and he returned to Tyrone where he became the Officer Commanding (O/C) of IRA forces in Counties Tyrone, Donegal and Fermanagh. By 1941, McNamee was named the O/C of the IRA's Northern Command. As O/C McNamee served with many well-known northern republicans of that era, among them were: Seán McCool, Seán McCaughey, Hugh McAteer and Jimmy Steele. In March 1942 IRA Chief of Staff Seán McCool was arrested and imprisoned and at that point the job came to McNamee. McCool kept the locations of numerous IRA arms dumps only in his head. Upon assuming the position of Chief of Staff, McNamee had another imprisoned IRA man (Liam Burke) (who had knowledge of the arms dump locations) "sign out" of prison (a formal written promise by the prisoner not to engage in illegal activities).

McNamee did not hold the Chief of Staff position long, as he was later arrested again, this time in Dublin in May 1942. He was given a three-year sentence to be served in the Curragh Camp, where he was placed with hundreds of other men from across Ireland who had been arrested for IRA activity by a Fianna Fáil government determined not to allow the IRA to threaten Ireland's neutrality during World War II. During his time in the Curragh he learned Irish and Spanish, while he raised the eyebrows of some detainees when he described Jesus Christ as "a revolutionary and a socialist". It was also during this period that he is believed to have become a Trotskyist upon conversations with fellow left-wing IRA members in the camp.

== Later life ==
Following the years spent in the Curragh, McNamee emigrated to the United States. He moved first to Philadelphia before settling in the Chicago area, where he is supposed to have acted as the go-between for the IRA leadership and its weapons suppliers in the U.S. McNamee never married, even after he had established himself in the United States. In 1969 when the IRA split between Official IRA and the Provisional IRA, he choose to side with the Provisionals. He was said to be a close friend of fellow IRA man (and acquitted gun-runner) George Harrison. McNamee's dedication to the Irish Republican cause was remembered: "He surrounded himself not with children and toys but with fellow Irishmen and women whose devotion to Ireland’s full freedom equalled his own. He had joined the IRA in 1932 and remained a faithful son until his last breath." A Sinn Féin cumann is named in his honor: Eoin McNamee Cumann, Kildress, County Tyrone. A monument to his memory stands at a quiet crossroads in the Sperrin Mountains of his native County Tyrone.

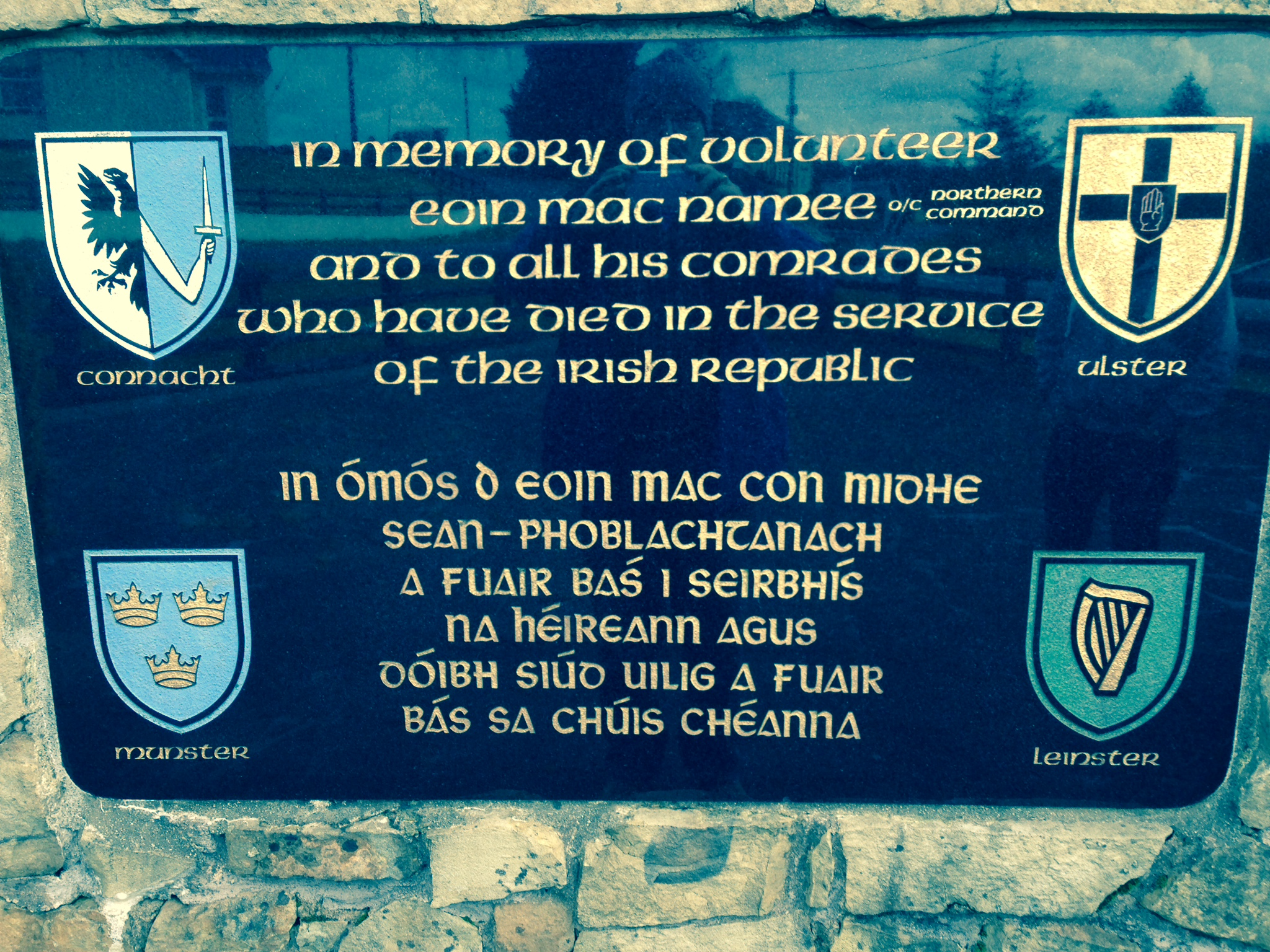
McNamee photo

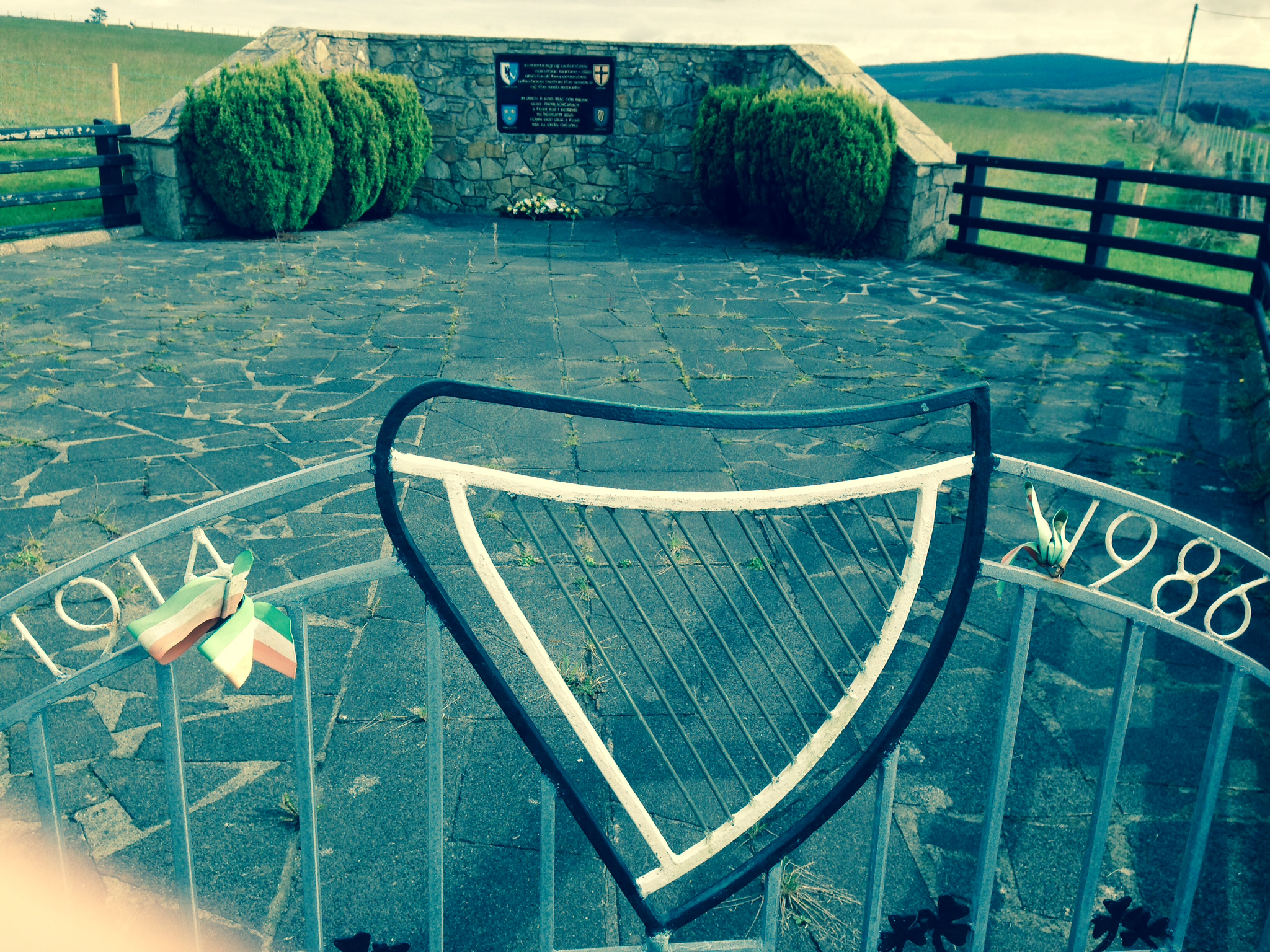

== Sources ==
- English, Richard (4 September 2008). Armed Struggle: The History of the IRA. Pan Macmillan. pp. 62–. ISBN 9780330475785.
- Bell, J. Bowyer (1 January 1987). The Gun in Politics: An Analysis of Irish Political Conflict, 1916-1986. Transaction Publishers. pp. 102–. ISBN 9781412837132.
- Treacy, Matt (2012). The Communist Party of Ireland 1921 - 2011. Lulu.com. pp. 161–. ISBN 9781291093186.
- Hull, Mark M. (January 2003). Irish Secrets: German Espionage in Ireland, 1939-45. Irish Academic Press. ISBN 9780716527565.
