= Seán McCool =

Irish Republican

- Seán Mac Cumhaill

Chief of Staff of the IRA
- In office February 1942 – 14 August 1942
- Preceded by: Seán Harrington
- Succeeded by: Eoin McNamee

Personal details
- Died: 1 May 1949 (aged 48)

Military service
- Branch/service: Anti-Treaty IRA
- Battles/wars: Irish Civil War

Seán McCool (Irish: Seán Mac Cumhaill) (died 1 May 1949) was a prominent Irish Republican and a former chief of staff of the Irish Republican Army. Imprisoned on numerous occasions, both North and South of the border, he embarked on a number of hunger strikes in order to secure his release. During the 1930s, McCool was one of the few socialists to remain in the IRA after the Republican Congress's decision to split. He stood as a candidate for the Irish Republican party Clann na Poblachta before leaving them as a result of their decision to go into government with Fine Gael.

McCool was described by Peadar O'Donnell as "...deeply read but very much the IRA man". He was also prominent within the GAA in his native County Donegal and the current home ground of the Donegal GAA, MacCumhaill Park, is named in his honour.

== Early IRA activity ==
McCool, based in County Donegal, took the Republican side during the Irish Civil War. At the end of the War he was sentenced and held as a prisoner of the Free State in either Finner Camp or Drumboe Castle.

McCool was present at the 2nd Drumboe martyrs commemoration for the execution of IRA volunteers Lieut. Dan Enright, Comdt. Gen. Charlie Daly, Brig. Comdt. Sean Larkin, and Lieut. Timothy O'Sullivan in 1923.

=== Land annuities campaign ===
By 1927 Peadar O'Donnell, the IRA leader, had begun a campaign to use social agitation on the issue of Land Annuities, where small farmers in the republic were being taxed to pay for land brought by the British government in the preceding century. McCool was one of O'Donnell's earliest supporters and by now was in charge of the East Donegal IRA.

In September 1926 McCool's IRA unit raided the offices of a landlord's agent in Donegal, taking away all records. On 19 February 1927 he was one of four men arrested in connection with the raid. Before the trial, the prisoners went on hunger strike for a week. McCool, and his co-accused, which included Peadar O'Donnell's younger brother Barney, received a sentence of six months imprisonment. which McCool served in Mountjoy Prison where he would have been a prisoner at the same time as Seán MacBride

Upon his release, McCool returned to IRA activity in Donegal and was the main speaker at the annual Drumboe commemoration in 1928. His period of freedom was not to last as, by May 1929, he was again arrested in Sligo and held on a 'documents' charge while engaged in land annuity agitation. He was later sentenced to eight months of imprisonment.

== Rebuilding the IRA ==
During the 1930s senior IRA officers and veterans of the Tan and Civil Wars such as McCool were sent to different areas for weeks at a time to help train local IRA recruits.

In 1931, despite not being a member of the party, Fianna Fáil members in Stranorlar, County Donegal attempted to select McCool as a candidate, without success. That same year the IRA attempted to launch its own political party, Saor Éire. McCool attended the inaugural meeting and seconded a motion sending fraternal greetings to the USSR. The success Fianna Fáil and the IRA at this time encouraged McCool, writing to fellow republican Frank Ryan in 1932 he said that the crowd (at the Drumboe march) "did one's heart good after all the black years... the youth are with us and that's everything".

McCool continued to be active on both the military and political fronts. In 1932 he joined Peadar O'Donnell, Charlotte Despard and David Fitzgerald on the governing Committee of the Workers College, a group close to the Revolutionary Workers Group which would later morph into the Communist Party of Ireland. Later that year, while still involved in training activities, an IRA unit under the command of McCool and Mick Price took over Donamon Castle in County Roscommon to set up a training camp. He also found time to address the Drumboe commemoration in his native County Donegal. McCool wrote to then IRA chief of staff Moss Twomey requesting permission to issue a statement, ahead of a planned Orange march in Donegal, denouncing imperialist displays. This plan was vetoed by Twomey and Peadar O'Donnell's appeal to the Orange Order was issued instead.

By 1933 McCool was commander of the IRA Donegal No.2 Battalion and presided over the organising of a new slua of na Fianna Éireann (IRA youth wing) in Letterkenny, County Donegal and attended a 'Release the Prisoners' meeting in Derry City. He was also selected to stand as an abstentionist Republican candidate for the Foyle Constituency in County Londonderry where he received 3,031 votes. This result, along with the votes obtained by other Republicans in Northern Ireland was hailed as significant with the IRA proclaiming 'the fight in the North has been given new life'.

The early 1930s saw increasing clashes between the IRA and the General Eoin O'Duffy's Blueshirts, At the 1934 IRA General Army Convention differences began to arise between those who thought that fighting Irish fascism in the form of the Blueshirts was the most important task for the IRA and those who believed that the Fianna Fáil government was using these clashes to turn against, and clamp down on the IRA. At the convention McCool warned against physical clashes with the Blueshirts, stating that the IRA should instead attack what they stood for.

1934 saw the IRA split, with many on the left such as McCool's longtime ally Peadar O'Donnell leaving to form the Republican Congress and being dismissed from the IRA. This split was initially amicable with each side retaining many friends within each organisation.

Despite being on the left of the IRA McCool remained loyal and did not join those who left to form the Republican Congress and again spoke at the Drumboe Commemoration in 1935.

== The Crown Entry Affair ==
25 April 1936 saw the IRA convene a court-martial in Belfast. The venue for the court-martial was the Craobh Ruadh Club at 10 Crown Entry. Presiding over the court-martial were members of the IRA's GHQ staff and the Ulster leadership of IRA which by now included Seán McCool.

At 3:25pm, the RUC raided the club and arrested all present. Those present were charged with Treason-Felony and refused to recognise the court. McCool was sentenced to five years imprisonment which he served in Belfast's Crumlin Road Gaol. By September 1936 McCool and Jim Killeen (Adjutant General before being arrested in the Craobh Ruadh Club) were on hunger strike for political status.

== Chief of Staff ==
Upon release after serving his 5-year sentence in Belfast, McCool returned to Ireland and was quickly arrested by the Gardaí with the intention of interning him. Representations were made to the justice minister, Gerald Boland, that since McCool had only been released from prison in Belfast that he should not be interned as he had effectively not been active and there was no evidence that he was a threat. Boland, contrary to the advice of the Gardaí, ordered his release.

November 1941 saw the arrest of IRA chief of Staff Pearse Kelly and a hurried IRA conference was called to deal with the vacancy. Seán Harrington was appointed Chief of Staff while the newly released Seán McCool took on the role of Adjutant-General. The Dublin government had the IRA on the run for a number of years now and this was the first time in almost a year that the IRA had a functioning GHQ staff. The IRA's previous strategy, advocated by Seán Russell, of focusing its activities on England had been a failure. The new leadership turned its focus to the six north eastern Counties which remained under British jurisdiction, while attempting to curtail armed actions by the IRA in Éire which had given the Dublin government justification to clamp down on the IRA.

However, it wasn't long before Harrington was arrested and the chief of staff position was again vacant. The IRA in Éire was in disarray and the leadership was severely depleted. The Northern Command of the IRA saw this and stepped into the void, effectively assuming control of the organisation, with some justification given that the focus of the IRA was to be Northern Ireland.

GHQ had become a mere symbol. February 1942 saw Seán McCool take on the role of Chief of Staff while Belfast's Eoin McNamee became Adjutant-General. McCool, McNamee and one or two others were the sum total of the IRA leadership and GHQ staff.

The process of rebuilding the IRA was difficult. With so many arrests contacts had been lost or disappeared. McCool travelled around the country attempting the re-establish IRA units and working towards the planned Northern campaign. McCool and McNamee worked tirelessly and even attempted to renew contacts with Germany ahead of the planned campaign in Northern Ireland.

Attempts to re-establish contact with Germany gathered pace when German Sergeant Gunther Schuetz escaped from Mountjoy Gaol in February 1942 and made contact with the IRA. Schuetz made contact with Mrs Caítlín Brugha (widow of Cathal Brugha) and McCool quickly developed plans to get Schuetz out of the country with a shopping list of weapons for the IRA.

McCool, however, was not to see these plans develop as August 1942 saw him arrested and interned in the Curragh despite being an election candidate for the Irish General Election scheduled for June 1943. McCool's arrest caused difficulties for the IRA for while he had done an impressive job as Chief of Staff in a short period of time, he had kept the locations and contents of many IRA arms dumps in his head. McCool, however, developed a plan to get this information to his comrades on the outside who were still planning for the Northern Campaign.

Republican internees held in the Curragh camp had split into two main factions. However, a third faction of those who refused to take sides was also in existence. One member of this non-aligned faction was Harry White. McCool hoped that White would appear to the authorities as having become disillusioned with the IRA due to the splits in the camp. With this is mind McCool selected White to become his courier. McCool asked White to 'sign out' of the camp and take the details of the arms dumps which McCool had to the IRA leadership on the outside. 'Signing out' meant giving an undertaking to the authorities that you would turn you back on the IRA and not re-engage in the Republican struggle. This was contrary to IRA rules and carried a great stigma with it. White initially refused as he did not wish to contravene IRA rules. McCool circumvented this problem by getting White to resign from the IRA, then sign out and rejoin when he left the camp. Technically this would mean that White was not breaking any IRA orders. The plan succeeded and, through White, McCool's information was relayed to the IRA on the outside. McCool used this method of getting men to 'sign out' to get other experienced IRA Volunteers out of the Curragh in order to help the IRA on the outside.

== Internment in the Curragh, Election Campaign and Hunger Strike ==
When McCool arrived in the Curragh internment camp in April 1942 the faction fighting within the camp between those who accepted Liam Leddy as the prisoners camp O/C and those who supported Pearse Kelly as camp O/C was in full flight. McCool, upon entering the Curragh, brought instructions from the IRA leadership on the outside that the rift between the factions was to be healed and both factions were to come together. Liam Leddy organised a meeting within the camp to discuss the directive from the leadership. McCool and a number of other prisoners, mostly on the Kelly side of the dispute, voted to accept the directive. Leddy refused to accept this and the split was solidified and McCool aligned himself with the Pearse Kelly faction.

While morale amongst the prisoners was affected by the split in the camp McCool and other senior prisoners in the camp ensured that men were kept occupied and that Republican politics was to the fore at all times. Towards the end of 1942 this took the form of a 'Statement on Republican Policy'. McCool and Pearse Kelly colluded in writing this document which was essentially an education program for Republican internees which was intended to ensure that the Curragh Camp became "..a school of training of leaders and fighters". The document focused on revolutionary training, the national struggle, the history and economics. This was a radical program which put the common good ahead of private property rights, called for large unproductive landholding to be redistributed, planned for surplus farm produce to be sold at a price guaranteed by the State and promoted State banks and co-ops among other radical social and economic proposals. One internee, Derry Kelleher, noted that this period in the Curragh was where "I first heard the word 'revolution' in the powerful northern accent of Seán MacCumhaill".

Despite the inconvenience of his imprisonment, McCool still had an election to fight as the Republican candidate in his native Donegal. The arrest and internment of an election candidate caused some controversy. Speaking in Leinster House, seat of the Irish Oireachtas, Roddy Connolly raised McCool's plight when discussing the effects that censorship implemented by the Fianna Fáil government were having on McCool's election campaign, namely that the Fianna Fáil government had censored one of McCool's election advertisements. During the same debate, Connolly also accused the Fianna Fáil government of abusing the powers of internment by arresting a candidate for parliamentary election, effectively depriving him of being able to contact his constituents during the election campaign.

On 24 May 1943, McCool begun a Hunger Strike. McCool's hunger strike demanded release or fair trial began on 22 May 1943. The public was not notified by the Dublin authorities until 18 June 1943 that McCool was on hunger strike and, due to the censorship in place at the time his election literature was not allowed to refer to this issue. By July 1943 the issue of those on Hunger Strike in the Curragh was the subject of debate in the Dublin Parliament and a number of demands were made for their release. From his prison cell McCool issued a letter "To the Electors of East Donegal" which said in part:

Ireland can only assume the march to freedom when the people return to Republican allegiance and, by their support of the Republican ideal, demonstrate to England and the world that the Irish question is not a matter of the internal affairs of the British Empire, but the right of an ancient and historic nation to its complete and absolute freedom and independence.

Despite the censorship in place, which meant that only McCool's name and Party appeared on the ballot paper with little or no media coverage of his policies or plight, he polled 1,961 votes in the Donegal East constituency. McCool's hunger strike ended on 11 July 1943, after 50 days when he and three other hunger strikers, John Gerard O'Doherty, Terry McLaughlin and John Joe Maxwell, were persuaded to come off it by Seán MacBride and Con Lehane.

Undoubtedly, the prolonged hunger strike had effects on the health of McCool, an issue which was again raised in the Dublin parliament on 30 November 1944 where one TD alleged that the doctor in the Curragh was refusing to tend to McCool and that McCool's health was in an extremely poor way

== After Internment ==
By 1945 most of the Republican internees who had been held in the Curragh were released. By this stage the IRA was almost non-existent. Internment had robbed it of its most talented leaders and the factional disputes that had taken place in the Curragh had disillusioned most of those who had been interned. Within this context Republicans slowly began trying to rebuild the IRA. This was no easy task as whole units had lost contact with the leadership, arms dumps were lost and forgotten about. Indeed, many were unsure who was actually still in the IRA.

The first major Republican gathering which took place after the 'Curragh Years' was the annual Bodenstown commemoration in June 1945. There, among the assembled crowd McCool met with Tony Magan and Michael Conway. All three agreed that they should work to begin rebuilding what was left of the IRA. However, by July 1945 he was again arrested and charged with plotting to kill Seán Gantly, head of the Free State Special Branch. Gantly, who had taken the Free State side after the Treaty split, had become the nemesis of many senior IRA members after carrying out a number of high-profile arrests against them.

By 1946 serious efforts were being made to re-establish the IRA leadership. In May 1947 Garda Special Branch were monitoring meetings held to establish a new republican national newspaper. These meetings were held under the banner of the 'Sean McCaughey Sinn Féin Cumann'. It was believed at that time that the IRA was using the cover of Sinn Féin to reorganise. A further meeting was held in June 1947 to discuss the reissue of An Phoblacht. McCool attended this meeting, during which the current state of the IRA was also discussed. This meeting, however, was noted for the argument which took place between Paddy McLogan and Seán McCool. McLogan had suggested that the IRA give up the idea of drilling among other things. Many delegated seized upon this as an opportunity to expound the necessity of physical force, the foremost of these being McCool. It was noted that the meeting ended without any firm proposals and that McLogan and McCool parted on bad terms.

The reorganisation of the IRA had seen the election of a new leadership which was primarily composed of those who had opposed McCool and Pearse Kelly in the Curragh and also contained Paddy McLogan.

== Clann na Poblachta ==
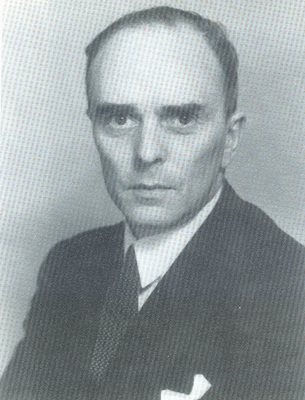
McCool joined Seán MacBride's Clann na Poblachta, a political party which attempted to push Irish Republicanism back into the Irish political mainstream

In July 1946 former IRA chief of staff and good friend of Seán McCool, Seán MacBride, formed a new political party called Clann na Poblachta. The Clann drew many well known and staunch IRA and former IRA members such as MacBride, Con Lehane, Jim Killeen, Michael Conway and Mick Fitzpatrick, and also attracted a number of younger radical members who had no Republican history or background.

By 1947 the Clann had won two by-elections and their campaigning had given hope to many Republicans who had become demoralised by a combination of the Curragh splits, the Stephen Hayes affair, and the lack of political direction within the IRA. Added to this was that many voters felt that Fianna Fáil had failed to live up to their early promise, this was exacerbated by Taoiseach de Valera's government being content to let IRA men die on hunger strike, particularly Sean McCaughey in Irish prisons.

The Clann once again put Republicanism centre stage and many Republican stalwarts, McCool, included were swept up by this tide and the belief that MacBride and the Clann might just go all the way and achieve what Fianna Fáil and the IRA has thus far failed to do.

1948 saw a general election in the Free State, one which Clann na Poblachta, spurred on by their by-election victories, presented a serious challenge to Fianna Fáil. McCool, now a member of the Clann, stood as a candidate in his home Donegal East constituency and increased his previous vote by receiving 3,217 votes. While McCool did not manage to win a seat, the overall Clann na Poblachta vote meant that the party held the balance of power in Ireland.

The decision was made to enter into coalition government with Fine Gael. This decision to go into government as partners with the tradition enemy of republicanism was a step too far for many Republicans within the Clann and Seán McCool was probably one of the most prominent members to resign from the party on this issue.

== Involvement in the GAA and death ==
The GAA had a strong tradition in the Stranorlar/Ballybofey area dating back to 1916 when the team 'Ballybofey Éire Óg's' was formed in Ballybofey and then in 1917 when 'Stranorlar Sarsfield's' was formed. Both teams then came together to form 'Erin's Hope'. In 1944, Ben Griffin and Sean MacCumhaill made an offer to Mark Byrne to buy a field which was within the town boundary of Ballybofey, but at the time the owner was unwilling to sell. In 1946, as part of the 'Civic Week' celebrations in the Twin Towns a friendly match between Sligo and Donegal was held in Mark Byrne's field. As this proved to be a great success, a Park Committee was formed and the field was finally secured for the GAA. McCool also served as secretary of the Donegal GAA from 1946 until his death in 1949.

On 1 May 1949 McCool died (at the relatively young age of 48) of a perforated gastric ulcer, shortly after Mark Byrne's field was secured for the GAA. Soon after that it was decided that the new Park would be known as Seán MacCumhaill Park, in honour of Seán McCool. On Sunday, 22 April 1956, the well equipped MacCumhaill Park was officially opened by the President of the GAA, and a plaque to the memory of the late Seán MacCumhaill was unveiled at the main gate. The name of the club was also changed from "Erin's Hope" to "Sean MacCumhaills", a name it retains to this day. A fitting tribute was given at Sean McCool's graveside: "He was a true Gael, and he loved everything that an Irishman should love. He loved the stories, language and songs of Ireland, and above all, her games."

The crowds attending McCool's funeral packed the streets of Stranorlar. After the funeral service, his tricolour draped coffin was borne through Stranorlar to the old graveyard. "Seán MacCumhaill was an extraordinary man" said Fr. Gallagher at the funeral, "he never once flinched from the ideals he had set for himself, he was an honest, God fearing Irishman."
