= The Troubles in Omagh =

Incidents in Omagh, Northern Ireland during the Troubles

The Troubles in Omagh recounts incidents during, and the effects of, The Troubles in Omagh, County Tyrone, Northern Ireland.

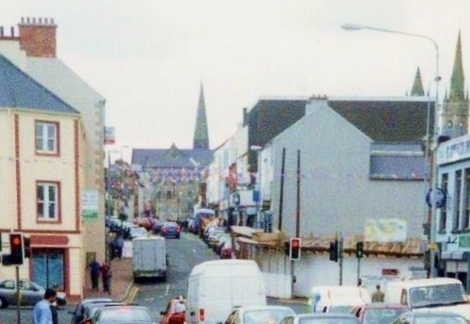
A view of Lower Market Street, site of the 1998 car bombing, where 29 people lost their lives; photo taken in 2001

Incidents in Omagh during the Troubles resulting in two or more fatalities:

1973

- 17 May 1973 - Arthur Place (29), Derek Reed (28), Sheridan Young (26), Barry Cox (28) and Frederick Drake (25), all off duty members of the British Army, were killed by a Provisional Irish Republican Army booby trap bomb while getting into a car, outside the Knock-na-Moe Castle Hotel, Omagh. Drake died on 3 June 1973.
- 25 June 1973 - Sean Loughran (37), Patrick Carty (26) and Dermot Crowley (18), all Catholics and members of the Provisional Irish Republican Army, were killed in a premature bomb explosion while travelling in a car, Gortin Road, near Omagh.

1998

- 15 August 1998 - James Barker (12), Seán McLaughlin (12) and Oran Doherty (8), from County Donegal, Fernando Blasco Baselga (12) and Rocío Abad Ramos (23) from Spain, Geraldine Breslin (43), Gareth Conway (18), Breda Devine (1), Adrian Gallagher (21), Mary Grimes (65), Brenda Logue (17), Brian McCrory (54), Seán McGrath (61), Jolene Marlow (17), Avril Monaghan (30; pregnant with twins), Maura Monaghan (1), Elizabeth Rush (57), Philomena Skelton (39), all Catholics; Deborah-Anne Cartwright (20), Esther Gibson (36), Olive Hawkes (60), Julia Hughes (21), Ann McCombe (48), Samantha McFarland (17), Alan Radford (16), Veda Short (56), Fred White (60), Bryan White (26), Lorraine Wilson (15), all Protestants, were killed in a Real Irish Republican Army car bomb explosion, Market Street, Omagh. Inadequate warnings were given. (Seán McGrath died from his injuries on 5 September 1998.)
