= Chief of Staff of the Irish Republican Army =

Several people are reported to have served as Chief of Staff of the Irish Republican Army (Irish: Ceann Foirne Óglaigh na hÉireann) in the organisations bearing that name. Due to the clandestine nature of these organisations, this list is not definitive.

== Chiefs of Staff of the Irish Republican Army (1917–1922) ==
Image	Name	Assumed position	Left position	Source
	Cathal Brugha^{[a]}	27 October 1917	23 March 1918	
	Richard Mulcahy	23 March 1918	15 January 1922	
	Eoin O'Duffy	15 January 1922	July 1922	

From this point on, this lineage diverts to Chief of Staff of the Defence Forces

a. Chairman of the Resident Executive

== Chiefs of Staff of the (anti-Treaty) Irish Republican Army (1922–1969) ==
Image	Name	Assumed position	Left position	Source
	Liam Lynch (1st time)	26 March 1922	18 June 1922	
	Joe McKelvey	18 June 1922	30 June 1922	
	Liam Lynch (2nd time)	30 June 1922	10 April 1923	
	Frank Aiken	20 April 1923	12 November 1925	
	Andrew Cooney	12 November 1925	July 1926	
	Maurice (Moss) Twomey	1926 (acting); 1927 (official)	June 1936	
	Seán MacBride	June 1936	1937	
	Tom Barry	1937	1937	
	Mick Fitzpatrick	1937	1938	
	Seán Russell	1938	April 1939	
	Stephen Hayes	April 1939	30 June 1941	
	Pearse Kelly (aka Paul Kelso)	1941	27 November 1941	
	Seán Harrington	Aft. November 1941	10 February 1942	
	Seán McCool	10 February 1942	14 August 1942	
	Eoin McNamee	c. March 1942	c. May 1942	
	Hugh McAteer	19 July 1942	12 October 1942	
	Charlie Kerins	October 1942	16 June 1944	
	Position vacant for some months	16 June 1944	1944	
	Harry White	1944	1945	
	Patrick Fleming	1 March 1945	1947?	
	Willie McGuinness	1947	1948?	
	Tony Magan (1st time)	November 1948	6 July 1957	
	Richard Burke	January 1957	May 1957	
	Tony Magan (2nd time)	May 1957	6 July 1957	
	Seán Cronin (1st time)	July 1957 (acting); 11 November 1957 (official)	October 1958	
	John Joe McGirl	October 1958	24 October 1958	
	Ruairí Ó Brádaigh (1st time)	24 October 1958	Late May 1959	
	Seán Cronin (2nd time)	Late May 1959	June 1960	
	Ruairí Ó Brádaigh (2nd time)	Summer 1960	7 September 1962	
	Cathal Goulding	7 September 1962	December 1969	

At an IRA General Army Convention held at Knockvicar House in Boyle, County Roscommon in December 1969, the IRA split into two factions, the majority Official IRA and the minority Provisional IRA.

== Chiefs of Staff of the Provisional Irish Republican Army (1969–2005) ==
Image	Name	Assumed position	Left position	Source
	Seán Mac Stíofáin	December 1969	19 November 1972	
	Joe Cahill	November 1972	March 1973	
	Seamus Twomey (1st time)	March 1973	June 1973	
	Éamonn O'Doherty	June 1973	June/July 1974	
	Seamus Twomey (2nd time)	June/July 1974	December 1977	
	Gerry Adams^{[a]}	3 December 1977	18 February 1978	
	Martin McGuinness^{[b]}	1978	Autumn 1982	
	Ivor Bell	Autumn 1982	September 1983	
	Kevin McKenna	September 1983	October 1997	
	Thomas "Slab" Murphy	October 1997	1998	
	Brian Keenan	1998	2002 or May 2008	
	Sean “Spike” Murray	May 2008	Incumbent	

a. Some noted Irish and British historians, including Ed Moloney, author of A Secret History of the IRA, have claimed that Gerry Adams has been part of the IRA leadership. Adams has always denied IRA membership, let alone being chief of staff.

b. Although he admitted in his lifetime to IRA membership, he denied ever being Chief of Staff

== Chiefs of Staff of the Official Irish Republican Army (1969–present) ==
Image	Name	Assumed Position	Left Position	Source
	Cathal Goulding	December 1969	Summer 1976	
	Sean Garland^{[a]}	Summer 1976		

a. Hanley and Millar (2010) wrote: Goulding was "replaced by Garland after an Army Council vote in summer 1976. Long dismissive of the IRA's titles and formal military structure, Garland was reluctant to adopt the title of Chief of Staff; but he was now undoubtedly in charge".

== Chiefs of Staff of the Continuity Irish Republican Army (1986–present) ==
Image	Name	Assumed Position	Left Position	Source
	Dáithí Ó Conaill	1986	1991	

== Chiefs of Staff of the Real Irish Republican Army (1997–present) ==
Image	Name	Assumed Position	Left Position	Source
	Michael McKevitt	1998	2002	
	Aidan O'Driscoll			

== See also ==
- Irish Republican Army
- IRA Quartermaster General
- IRA Director of Intelligence
