= South West Acute Hospital =

Hospital in Enniskillen, Northern Ireland

- Western Health and Social Care Trust
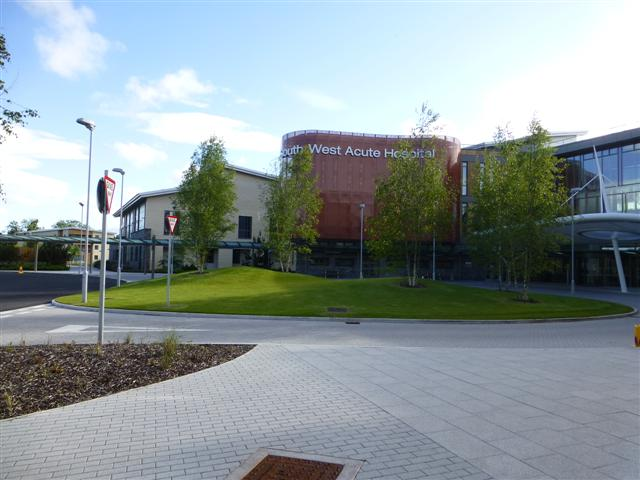
- South West Acute Hospital

- Location in Northern Ireland

Geography
- Location: 124 Irvinestown Road, Enniskillen, County Fermanagh, Northern Ireland
- Coordinates: 54.3657°N 7.6414°W

Organisation
- Care system: Health and Social Care
- Affiliated university: Queen's University Belfast; Royal College of Surgeons in Ireland

Services
- Emergency department: Yes
- Beds: 232

History
- Founded: 2012

Links
- Website: westerntrust.hscni.net/hospitals/south-west-acute-hospital/

South West Acute Hospital is a local teaching hospital located in Enniskillen, County Fermanagh, Northern Ireland. It is managed by Western Health and Social Care Trust.

== Location and access ==
The hospital is on the northern outskirts of Enniskillen, and the main entrance is via the A32 Irvinestown Road. Buses 397a, 94 and 194 serve the hospital.

== History ==
The hospital was built to replace the Erne Hospital, and was opened by the Queen and the Duke of Edinburgh on 21 June 2012. It was the first new hospital to be built in Northern Ireland for more than a decade, and was the first hospital in Northern Ireland with single ensuite rooms for every patient.

== Facilities ==
The hospital has up to 210 inpatient and 22 day-case beds.

== Services ==
The hospital has been designated as one of the nine acute hospitals in the acute hospital network of Northern Ireland on which healthcare would be focused under the government health policy 'Developing Better Services'.

== Teaching ==
The hospital is a university teaching hospital for both Queen's University Belfast and the Royal College of Surgeons in Ireland.
