= Omagh Courthouse =

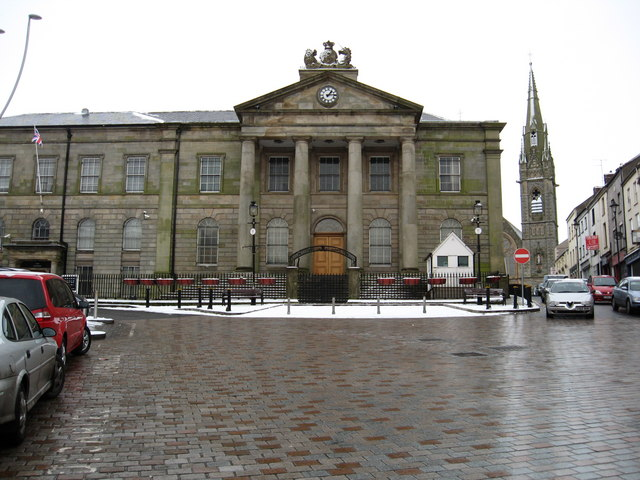
- Omagh Courthouse

- Shown in Northern Ireland
- 54.6001°N 7.3044°W
- Location: Omagh, County Tyrone

History
- Built: 1814

Site notes
- Architect: John Hargrave
- Architectural style: Neoclassical style

Listed Building – Grade B+
- Official name: Courthouse, High Street, Omagh
- Designated: 23 November 1976
- Reference no.: HB 11/13/001

Omagh Courthouse is a judicial facility in High Street, Omagh, County Tyrone, Northern Ireland. It is a Grade B+ listed building.

== History ==
The building, which was designed by John Hargrave in the Neoclassical style, was completed in 1814. The design involved a symmetrical main frontage facing the High Street; the central section featured a tetrastyle portico with Tuscan order columns supporting a frieze and a pediment containing a clock. A carving depicting the Royal coat of arms was installed at the apex of the pediment. It was extended to the south with five extra bays to the designs of William Joseph Barre of Newry in 1863.

The building was originally used as a facility for dispensing justice but, following the implementation of the Local Government (Ireland) Act 1898, which established county councils in every county, it also became the meeting place for Tyrone County Council. In the 1960s, county leaders decided that the courthouse was too cramped to accommodate the county council in the context of the county council's increasing administrative responsibilities, especially while the courthouse was still acting as a facility for dispensing justice, and therefore chose to move to County Hall, conveniently located a short distance to the north east of the courthouse on the north side of the River Strule, in 1962.

On 15 August 1998 there was a car bomb attack by the dissident Irish republican paramilitary group, the Real Irish Republican Army: the intended target had been the courthouse, but because the driver was unable to find a parking space in front of the building he parked the car in Market Street, roughly 365 yards (334 m) to the east the courthouse, killing 29 people (including a woman pregnant with twins) and injuring some 220 others.

The clock, which had stopped working in 2013, was finally repaired, after the Courts and Tribunals Service had found the necessary funding, in early 2019. In November 2020 the justice minister, David Ford, said that he accepted an inspection report recommending that the Omagh Courthouse should be designated a "satellite court" in a proposed rationalisation of the court system.
