= Tyrone County Hospital =

- Western Health and Social Care Trust
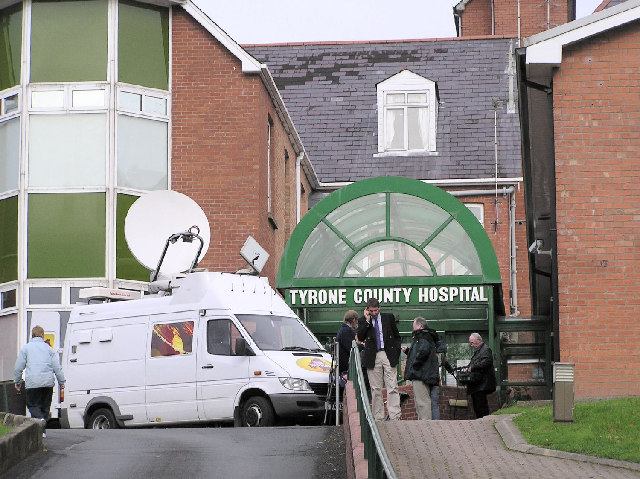
- The hospital in October 2005

Geography
- Location: Omagh, County Tyrone, Northern Ireland, United Kingdom
- Coordinates: 54.598°N 7.280°W

Organisation
- Care system: Health and Social Care in Northern Ireland
- Type: General

History
- Opened: 1899
- Closed: 2017

Links
- Lists: Hospitals in Northern Ireland

Tyrone County Hospital was a hospital and the main health facility in Omagh, County Tyrone, Northern Ireland. The hospital occupied the same site in the town from 1899 until it closed to new patients on 20 June 2017 when it was replaced by the newly built Omagh Hospital and Primary Care Complex.

== History ==
The hospital has its origins in an infirmary which was opened in Market Street in Omagh in 1796. The hospital moved to a new site on Hospital Road in 1899. A post graduate centre for students of Queen's University Belfast was opened by Richard Needham in July 1988 and a new renal unit followed in August 1989.

In June 2002 the then Health Minister Bairbre de Brún announced the closure of the hospital, a decision which was confirmed by the new Health Minister Michael McGimpsey in January 2009. After services transferred to the new Omagh Hospital and Primary Care Complex the Tyrone County Hospital closed at 08:00 AM on 20 June 2017.
