= Omagh bombing =

1998 car bombing in Northern Ireland

- Part of the Troubles
- The red Vauxhall Cavalier containing the bomb. This photograph was taken shortly before the explosion; the camera was found in the rubble.
- Location: 54°36′01″N 07°17′56″W; Omagh, County Tyrone, Northern Ireland
- Date: 15 August 1998; 28 years ago 3:04 pm (BST)
- Target: Courthouse
- Attack type: Car bomb
- Deaths: 29
- Injuries: About 220 initially reported; later reports stated over 300
- Perpetrator: Real IRA

A car bombing took place in the town of Omagh in County Tyrone, Northern Ireland on 15 August 1998. It was carried out by the Real Irish Republican Army (Real IRA), a Provisional Irish Republican Army (IRA) splinter group who opposed the IRA's ceasefire and the Good Friday Agreement, signed earlier in the year. The bombing killed 29 people and injured about 220 others, making it the deadliest incident of the Troubles in Northern Ireland and the second deadliest incident of the conflict overall after the Dublin and Monaghan bombings of 1974. Telephoned warnings which did not specify the location had been sent almost forty minutes beforehand, and police inadvertently moved people towards the bomb.

The bombing caused outrage both locally and internationally, spurred the Northern Ireland peace process, and dealt a severe blow to the dissident Irish republican campaign. The Real IRA denied that the bomb was intended to kill civilians and apologised; shortly after, the group declared a ceasefire. The victims included people of many backgrounds and ages: Protestants, Catholics, six teenagers, six children, a woman pregnant with twins, two Spanish tourists and others on a day trip from the Republic of Ireland. Both unionists and Irish nationalists were killed and injured. As a result of the bombing, new anti-terrorism laws were swiftly enacted by the United Kingdom and Ireland.

There have been allegations that British, Irish and US intelligence agencies had information which could have prevented the bombing, most of which came from double agents inside the Real IRA, but this information was not given to the Royal Ulster Constabulary (RUC). In 2008, the BBC reported that British intelligence agency GCHQ had recorded conversations between the bombers as the bomb was being driven into Omagh.

A 2001 report by the Police Ombudsman said that the RUC Special Branch failed to act on prior warnings and criticised the RUC's investigation of the bombing. Police reportedly obtained circumstantial and coincidental evidence against some suspects, but were unable to convict. Colm Murphy was tried and convicted of conspiring to cause the bombing, but was released on appeal after it was revealed that the Garda Síochána forged interview notes used in the case. Murphy's nephew Sean Hoey was also tried but was acquitted. In June 2009, the victims' families won a £1.6 million civil action settlement against four defendants, who were found liable for the bombing. In 2014, Seamus Daly was charged with the murder of 29 people; the case against him was withdrawn in 2016.

== Background ==
After negotiations to end the Troubles failed in 1996, political violence resumed in Northern Ireland and peaked during the Drumcree crises. The peace process resumed in 1997. Sinn Féin accepted the Mitchell Principles in September 1997, which involved commitment to non-violence as part of the peace process negotiations. Dissident members of the Provisional Irish Republican Army (IRA), who saw this as a betrayal of the republican struggle for a united Ireland, left in October 1997 to form the Real Irish Republican Army (Real IRA).

The Real IRA's tactics were the same as those of the IRA before it. It targeted the British security forces and carried out bombings of symbolic or economic targets. Its goal was to damage the economy and cause severe disruption, thereby putting pressure on the British government to withdraw from Northern Ireland. Warnings were sent before such bombings, along with a code word so that the authorities would know it was genuine. The Real IRA began its paramilitary campaign with an attempted car bombing in Banbridge, County Down, on 7 January 1998. The 300 pounds (140 kg) explosive was defused by security forces. Over the following months, it mounted several car bomb and mortar attacks. There were also attacks or attempted attacks in Moira, Portadown, Armagh, Newry, Lisburn, Belfast, and Belleek, as well as another car bombing in Banbridge on 1 August, which caused thirty-five injuries but no deaths.

The Omagh bombing took place thirteen weeks after the Good Friday Agreement was signed in April 1998. Intended to be a comprehensive solution to the Troubles, the agreement had broad support both in Ireland and internationally.

== Attack ==
=== Preparation and warnings ===
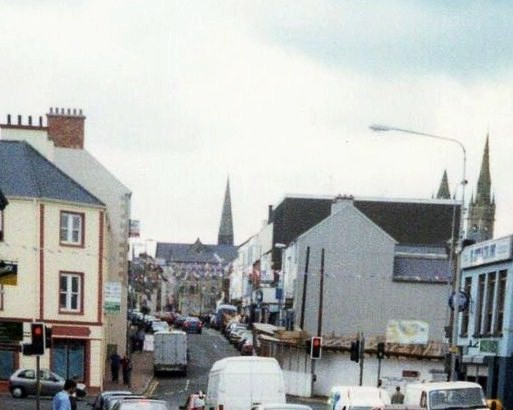
Lower Market Street, site of the bombing, 2001. The courthouse is in the background

On 13 August, a maroon 1991 Vauxhall Cavalier was stolen from outside a house at St Macartan's Villas in Carrickmacross, County Monaghan, Republic of Ireland. At that time, it bore the County Donegal registration number 91-DL-2554. The bombers replaced its Republic of Ireland number plates with fake Northern Ireland plates (MDZ 5211), and loaded the car with about 500 pounds (230 kg) of fertiliser-based explosives.

On Saturday 15 August, the bomb car was driven from County Monaghan across the Irish border to Omagh, County Tyrone, travelling north and west. A scout car drove ahead of the bomb car to warn it of any checkpoints, and the two cars were in constant contact by mobile phone. At 14:19, the bomb car was parked outside S.D. Kells' clothes shop on Omagh's Market Street, at the eastern edge of the town centre, near the crossroads with Dublin Road. The driver could not find a parking space near the intended target, Omagh Courthouse. The two male bombers armed the bomb and set the timer to detonate it in forty minutes. They left the car and walked east down Market Street towards Campsie Road before leaving Omagh in the scout car. A family of Spanish tourists happened to take photos next to the car; the man and child in the photograph survived but the photographer did not.

At around 14:30, three phone calls were made warning of a bomb in Omagh, using the same codeword that had been used in the Real IRA's bombing in Banbridge two weeks earlier: "Martha Pope". The calls were made from telephone boxes many miles away in southern County Armagh. The first warning was telephoned to Ulster Television saying, "There's a bomb, courthouse, Omagh, main street, 500lb, explosion thirty minutes." One minute later, the office received a second warning saying, "Bomb, Omagh town, fifteen minutes." The caller claimed the warning on behalf of "Óglaigh na hÉireann". The next minute, the Coleraine office of the Samaritans received a call stating that a bomb would go off on the "main street" of Omagh "about 200 yards" (180 m) from the courthouse. The recipients passed on the information to the Royal Ulster Constabulary (RUC).

BBC News stated that police "were clearing an area near the local courthouse, forty minutes after receiving a telephone warning, when the bomb detonated. But the warning was unclear and the wrong area was evacuated." The warnings mentioned "main street" when there was no street by that name in Omagh, although Market Street–High Street was the town's main shopping street. It runs for hundreds of yards east–west from the site of the bomb to the courthouse. Given the warnings, police believed the bomb was near the courthouse, so they evacuated the surrounding buildings and streets. As it happened, they moved people away from the courthouse and towards the site of the bomb, placing a cordon at Scarffe's Entry. The courthouse is roughly 365 yards (334 m) from the spot where the car bomb was parked. During the later Special Criminal Court trial of Real IRA director Michael McKevitt, witnesses for the prosecution said that the inaccurate warnings were accidental. McKevitt was a former "quartermaster general" in the Provisional IRA.

=== Explosion and aftermath ===
The scene in Market Street minutes after the bomb went off

The car bomb exploded at 15:04 BST in the crowded shopping area. It tore the car into deadly shrapnel and created a fireball and shockwave. People were caught in "a storm" of glass, masonry and metal as the blast destroyed shop fronts and blew the roofs off buildings. A thick cloud of dust and smoke filled the street. The blast was so strong that it tore up concrete and pipes burst; water running down the street turned red from the blood of dead and wounded people. Within twenty-five minutes journalists were on the street taking pictures. Twenty-one people who had been standing near the bomb were killed outright. Eight more died on the way to or in a hospital.

Injured survivor Marion Radford described hearing an "unearthly bang", followed by "an eeriness, a darkness that had just come over the place", then screams as she saw "bits of bodies, limbs" on the ground while she searched for her 16-year-old son, Alan. She later discovered he had been killed yards away from her after the two became separated minutes before the blast.

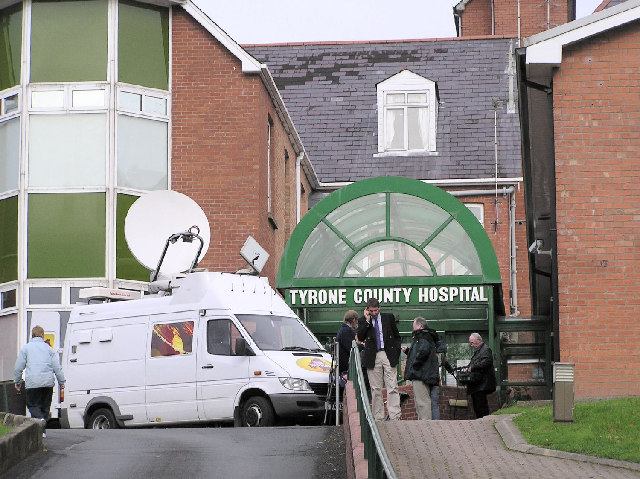
Tyrone County Hospital, where many of the bomb victims were taken

BBC News said that survivors described scenes of "utter carnage," with the dead and dying "strewn across the street and other victims screaming for help". The injured were initially taken to two local hospitals, the Tyrone County Hospital and the Erne Hospital. A local leisure centre was set up as a casualty field centre, and the British Army's Lisanelly Barracks served as a makeshift morgue. According to the Conflict Archive on the Internet, rescue workers likened the scene to "battlefield conditions". Tyrone County Hospital became overwhelmed and appealed for local doctors to come in to help.

Because of the stretched emergency services, buses, cars and helicopters were used to take the victims to other hospitals in Northern Ireland, including the Royal Victoria Hospital in Belfast and Altnagelvin Hospital in Derry. A Tyrone County Hospital spokesman stated that they treated 108 casualties, 44 of whom had to be transferred to other hospitals. Paul McCormick of the Northern Ireland Ambulance Service said, "The injuries are horrific, from amputees, to severe head injuries to serious burns, and among them are women and children." The morning after the bombing, a man was killed when his car collided with an ambulance ferrying bomb victims to hospitals in Belfast.

Omagh Leisure Centre was used as a base for relatives and friends of the victims. There they could receive news updates.

=== Victims ===
Twenty-nine people were killed, eighteen Catholics (including two Spaniards), ten Protestants and one Mormon. The last victim to die, Seán McGrath, was in critical condition in hospital for three weeks before dying from his injuries on 5 September.

- James Barker, 12, a Buncrana Primary School pupil on a Spanish–Irish language‑exchange trip
- Fernando Blasco Baselga, 12, from Madrid, on the same Buncrana Primary School exchange trip
- Shaun McLaughlin, 12, a Buncrana Primary School pupil on the exchange trip
- Oran Doherty, 8, a Buncrana Primary School pupil on the exchange trip
- Rocio Abad Ramos, 23, from Madrid, supervising the exchange trip
- Geraldine Breslin, 43, a married mother of one and shop assistant at Watterson's drapers
- Ann McCombe, 48, a married mother of two and shop assistant at Watterson's drapers
- Veda Short, 56, a married mother of four and shop assistant at Watterson's drapers
- Debra‑Anne Cartwright, 20, working in a beauty salon
- Gareth Conway, 18, a student
- Breda Devine, 20 months old, out with her mother
- Aiden Gallagher, 21, a self‑employed mechanic shopping with a friend
- Esther Gibson, 36, a Sunday school teacher shopping
- Mary Grimes, 66, a married mother of 12 celebrating her birthday and out shopping with her daughter and granddaughter
- Avril Monaghan, 30, a married mother of four, Mary Grimes's daughter and Maura Monaghan's mother, pregnant with twins
- Maura Monaghan, 20 months old, Avril Monaghan's daughter and Mary Grimes's granddaughter
- Olive Hawkes, 60, a married mother of two out shopping
- Julia Hughes, 21, working in a photography shop for the summer
- Alan Radford, 16, an Omagh High School pupil out shopping with his mother
- Brenda Logue, 17, a high‑school pupil from Carrickmore who was out with her mother and grandmother
- Jolene Marlow, 17, in town with her sister and great aunt
- Samantha McFarland, 17, a Strabane College student and voluntary shop assistant for Oxfam
- Lorraine Wilson, 15, a schoolgirl and Samantha McFarland's best friend also working as a voluntary shop assistant for Oxfam
- Brian McCrory, 54, a married father of three and amateur photographer out to leave in film for developing and collecting a prescription
- Seán McGrath, 61, a married father of four and retired businessman who died three weeks later from his injuries
- Elizabeth "Libbi" Rush, 57, a mother of three and shop and café owner
- Philomena Skelton, 39, a married mother of four out shopping with her husband and three daughters for school uniforms
- Bryan White, 27, shopping with his father
- Fred White, 60, a married father of two shopping with his son Bryan

=== Reactions ===
There was a strong regional and international outcry against 'dissident' republicans and in favour of the Northern Ireland peace process. Prime Minister Tony Blair called the bombing an "appalling act of savagery and evil." Queen Elizabeth II expressed her sympathies to the victims' families, while Charles, Prince of Wales (later King Charles III) paid a visit to the town and spoke with the families of some of the victims. Pope John Paul II and President Bill Clinton also expressed their sympathies. The Spanish Ambassador to Ireland visited some of the injured.

Churches across Northern Ireland called for a national day of mourning. Church of Ireland Archbishop of Armagh Robin Eames said on BBC Radio that, "From the Church's point of view, all I am concerned about are not political arguments, not political niceties. I am concerned about the torment of ordinary people who don't deserve this."

Social Democratic and Labour Party leader John Hume called the perpetrators of the bombing "undiluted fascists". Sinn Féin's Martin McGuinness said, "This appalling act was carried out by those opposed to the peace process," while Gerry Adams said, "I am totally horrified by this action. I condemn it without any equivocation whatsoever." McGuinness mentioned that both Catholics and Protestants alike were injured and killed, saying, "All of them were suffering together. I think all them were asking the question 'Why?', because so many of them had great expectations, great hopes for the future." Sinn Féin as an organisation initially refused to co-operate with the investigation into the attack because the RUC was involved. On 17 May 2007, McGuinness stated that Irish republicans would co-operate with an independent, international investigation if one were created.

The security forces believed the Real IRA were responsible. RUC Chief Constable Ronnie Flanagan accused the bombers of deliberately trying to direct civilians towards the bomb.

As the trial of a suspect started in 2006, British government prosecutor Gordon Kerr called the warnings "not only wrong but... meaningless" and said that the nature of the warnings made it inevitable that people would be moved towards the bomb.

Three days after the bombing, the Real IRA claimed responsibility for planting the bomb but strongly denied intending to kill civilians and apologised to the victims. It also announced that "all military operations have been suspended". The group came under intense pressure to end its campaign. IRA members visited the homes of sixty people connected with the Real IRA, and ordered them to disband and stop interfering with its arms dumps. On 7 September, the Real IRA called a ceasefire, although it would later resume its campaign. The Irish National Liberation Army (INLA) also called a ceasefire on 22 August. The National Consortium for the Study of Terrorism has accused the INLA of providing supplies for the bombing. The INLA continued to observe the ceasefire and later began to disarm. BBC News reported that, "Like the other bombings in the early part of 1998 in places like Lisburn and Banbridge, Omagh was a conscious attempt by republicans who disagreed with the political strategy of Gerry Adams and Martin McGuinness, to destabilise Northern Ireland in that vulnerable moment of hope. It failed – but there is a terrible irony to the way in which the campaign was halted only by the wave of revulsion triggered by the carnage at Omagh."

In response to the bombing, both the British and Irish governments vowed to enact tougher anti-terrorism laws. On 3 September, the British parliament passed the Criminal Justice (Terrorism and Conspiracy) Act 1998, and the Irish parliament passed the Offences Against The State (Amendment) Bill. Members of both governments described the measures as "draconian" and the bills were rushed through, despite protests from members of parliament and civil liberties groups. The new measures included allowing suspected members of terrorist groups to be convicted on the word of a senior police officer, curtailment of the right to silence, and longer detention periods.

== Responsibility ==
=== Allegations ===
The Real IRA claimed responsibility for the bombing at the time. On 7 February 2008, a Real IRA spokesman stated that the group "had minimal involvement in Omagh. Our code word was used; nothing more. To have stated this at the time would have been lost in an understandable wave of emotion. ... Omagh was an absolute tragedy. Any loss of civilian life is regrettable."

On 9 October 2000, the BBC's Panorama programme aired the special "Who Bombed Omagh?", hosted by journalist John Ware. The programme quoted RUC Chief Constable Ronnie Flanagan as saying, "Sadly up to this point we haven't been able to charge anyone with this terrible atrocity." Panorama alleged that the police on both sides of the Irish border knew the identity of the bombers. It said, "As the bomb car and the scout car headed for the border, the police believe they communicated by mobile phone. This is based on an analysis of calls made in the hours before, during and after the bombing. This analysis may prove to be the key to the Omagh bomb investigation." Using the phone records, the programme reported the names of the four prime suspects as Oliver Traynor, Liam Campbell, Colm Murphy, and Seamus Daly. The police had leaked the information to the BBC since it was too circumstantial and coincidental to be used in court.

Northern Ireland Secretary Peter Mandelson praised the Panorama programme, calling it "a very powerful and very professional piece of work". Irish Taoiseach Bertie Ahern criticised it, saying that "bandying around names on television" could hinder attempts to secure convictions. First Minister David Trimble stated that he had "very grave doubts" about it. Lawrence Rush, whose wife Elizabeth died in the bombing, tried legally to block the programme from being broadcast, saying, "This is media justice, we can't allow this to happen". Democratic Unionist Party assembly member Oliver Gibson, whose niece Esther died in the bombing, said that the government did not have the will to pursue those responsible and welcomed the programme.

The police believe that the bombing of BBC Television Centre in London on 4 March 2001 was a revenge attack for the broadcast. On 9 April 2003, the five Real IRA members behind the BBC bombing were convicted and sentenced to between sixteen and twenty-two years.

=== Prosecutions and court cases ===
On 22 September 1998, the RUC and Gardaí arrested twelve men in connection with the bombing. They subsequently released all of them without charge. On 25 February 1999, they questioned and arrested at least seven suspects. Builder and publican Colm Murphy, from Ravensdale, County Louth, was charged three days later for conspiracy and was convicted on 23 January 2002 by the Republic of Ireland's Special Criminal Court. He was sentenced to fourteen years. In January 2005, Murphy's conviction was quashed and a retrial was ordered by the Court of Criminal Appeal, on the grounds that two Gardaí had falsified interview notes, and that Murphy's previous convictions were improperly taken into account by the trial judges.

On 28 October 2000, the families of four children killed in the bombing – James Barker, 12, Samantha McFarland, 17, Lorraine Wilson, 15, and 20-month-old Breda Devine – launched a civil action against the suspects named by the Panorama programme. On 15 March 2001, the families of all twenty-nine people killed in the bombing launched a £2-million civil action against Real IRA suspects Liam Campbell, Colm Murphy, Seamus Daly, Seamus McKenna and Michael McKevitt. Former Northern Ireland secretaries Peter Mandelson, Tom King, Peter Brooke, Lord Hurd, Lord Prior and Lord Merlyn-Rees signed up in support of the plaintiffs' legal fund. The civil action began in Northern Ireland on 7 April 2008.

On 6 September 2006, Murphy's nephew, Sean Hoey, an electrician from Jonesborough, County Armagh, went on trial accused of twenty-nine counts of murder, and terrorism and explosives charges. Upon its completion, Hoey's trial found on 20 December 2007 that he was not guilty of all 56 charges against him.

On 24 January 2008, former Chief Constable Ronnie Flanagan apologised to the victims' families for the lack of convictions in relation to the Omagh bombing. This apology was rejected by some of the victims' families. After the Hoey verdict, BBC News reporter Kevin Connolly stated, "The Omagh families were dignified in defeat, as they have been dignified at every stage of their fight for justice. Their campaigning will go on, but the prospect is surely receding now that anyone will ever be convicted of murdering their husbands and brothers and sisters and wives and children." Police Service of Northern Ireland Chief Constable Sir Hugh Orde stated that he believed there would be no further prosecutions.

On 8 June 2009, the civil case taken by victims' relatives concluded, with McKevitt, Campbell, Murphy and Daly being found to have been responsible for the bombing. McKenna (died 14 July 2013) was cleared of involvement. The others were held liable for £1.6 million of damages. It was described as a "landmark" damages award internationally. Murphy and Daly appealed and were granted a retrial, but this second trial also found them responsible for the bombing, with the judge describing the evidence as overwhelming.

On 10 April 2014 Daly was charged with murdering the twenty-nine victims of the Omagh bombing and with other offences. He was arrested in Newry by police after he crossed the border into Northern Ireland. The case against Daly was withdrawn in February 2016, with the Public Prosecution Service deciding there was "no reasonable prospect of conviction".

In 2021, Michael Gallagher, whose son Aiden was killed during the attack, brought a case to the Belfast High Court which resulted in Mr Justice Mark Horner ruling that when considering certain grounds "there was a real prospect of preventing the Omagh bombing." Horner also called for new investigations on both sides of the Irish border.

=== Police Ombudsman report ===
Police Ombudsman Nuala O'Loan published a report on 12 December 2001 that strongly criticised the RUC over its handling of the bombing investigation. Her report stated that RUC officers had ignored the previous warnings about a bomb and had failed to act on crucial intelligence. She went on to say that officers had been uncooperative and defensive during her inquiry. The report concluded that, "The victims, their families, the people of Omagh and officers of the RUC were let down by defective leadership, poor judgement and a lack of urgency." It recommended the setting up of a new investigation team independent of the new Police Service of Northern Ireland, which had since replaced the RUC, led by a senior officer from an outside police force.

Initially, the Police Association, which represents both senior officers and rank and file members of the Northern Ireland police, went to court to try to block the release of the O'Loan report. The Association stated that, "The ombudsman's report and associated decisions constitute a misuse of her statutory powers, responsibilities and functions." The group later dropped its efforts. RUC Chief Constable Ronnie Flanagan called the report "grossly unfair" and "an erroneous conclusion reached in advance and then a desperate attempt to find anything that might happen to fit in with that." Other senior police officers also disputed the report's findings. Flanagan issued a 190-page counter-report in response, and has also stated that he has considered taking legal action. He argued that the multiple warnings were given by the RIRA to cause confusion and lead to a greater loss of life. Assistant Chief Constables Alan McQuillan and Sam Kincaid sent affidavits giving information that supported the report.

The families of the victims expressed varying reactions to the report. Kevin Skelton, whose wife Philomena died in the attack, said that, "After the bomb at Omagh, we were told by Tony Blair and the Taoiseach, Bertie Ahern, that no stone would be left unturned ... It seems to me that a lot of stones have been left unturned," but then expressed doubt that the bombing could have been prevented. Lawrence Rush, whose wife Elizabeth died in the attack, said that, "There's no reason why Omagh should have happened – the police have been in dereliction of their duty." Other Omagh residents said that the police did all that they could. The Belfast Telegraph called the report a "watershed in police accountability" and stated that it "broke the taboo around official criticism of police in Northern Ireland". Upon leaving office on 5 November 2007, Nuala O'Loan stated that the report was not a personal battle between herself and Sir Ronnie, and did not lead to one. She stated that the "recommendations which we made were complied with".

=== Independent bombing investigation ===
On 7 February 2008, the Northern Ireland Policing Board decided to appoint a panel of independent experts to review the police's investigation of the bombing. Some of the relatives of the bombing victims criticised the decision, saying that an international public inquiry covering both the Republic of Ireland and Northern Ireland should have been established instead. The review was to determine whether enough evidence exists for further prosecutions. and to investigate the possible perjury of two police witnesses made during Hoey's trial. Sinn Féin member of the Policing Board Alex Maskey stated that, "Sinn Féin fully supports the families' right to call for a full cross-border independent inquiry while the Policing Board has its clear and legal obligation to scrutinise the police handling of the investigations ... We recognise that the board has a major responsibility in carrying out our duty in holding the PSNI to account in the interests of justice for the Omagh families".

=== Advance warning allegations ===
In 2001, a double agent known as Kevin Fulton claimed he told his MI5 handlers three days before the bombing that the Real IRA was about to bring a "huge bomb" across the border. Fulton claims he also told them who he believed was making it and where it was being made. He said that MI5 did not pass his information over to the police.

RUC Chief Constable Ronnie Flanagan called the allegations "preposterous" and said the information Fulton gave his handlers was full of "distortions and inaccuracies". However, Flanagan admitted that some of Fulton's information was not passed to RUC Special Branch due to "an administrative error". In September 2001, British security forces informer Willie Carlin said the Ombudsman had obtained evidence confirming Fulton's allegations. A spokesman for the Ombudsman neither confirmed nor denied this assertion.

David Rupert, an American citizen, was jointly run as an agent by MI5 and the Federal Bureau of Investigation (FBI). He worked as a fundraiser for the Real IRA. On 11 August 1998, four days before the bombing, Rupert informed his MI5 handlers that the Real IRA was planning a car bomb attack in Omagh or Derry. It is not known whether this information was passed to the RUC Special Branch.

The Gardaí also had their own agent close to the Real IRA at the time, Paddy Dixon, who stole cars that were used by the group to transport bombs. Days before the bombing, the Real IRA had Dixon steal the Vauxhall Cavalier it would use in the attack. Dixon immediately told his handler, Detective Sergeant John White. On 12 August, White passed this on to his superior, Detective Chief Superintendent Dermot Jennings. According to White, Jennings told him that they would let the bomb go through, mainly so that the Real IRA would not become suspicious of Dixon.

In 2003, a transcript of a conversation between Dixon and White was released. In it, Dixon confirms that Gardaí let the bomb go through and says that, "Omagh is going to blow up in their faces". In February 2004, PSNI Chief Constable Hugh Orde called for the Republic of Ireland to hand over Dixon. In March 2006, Chief Constable Orde stated that "security services did not withhold intelligence that was relevant or would have progressed the Omagh inquiry". He stated that the dissident republicans investigated by MI5 were members of a different cell than the perpetrators of the Omagh bombing.

A 2013 independent report concluded that the British, Irish and US intelligence agencies "starved" police in Omagh of intelligence that could have prevented the bombing. The report was commissioned by the victims' families and produced by Rights Watch (UK).

=== GCHQ monitoring ===
A BBC Panorama documentary, titled "Omagh: What the Police Were Never Told", was aired in September 2008. It revealed that the British intelligence agency GCHQ was monitoring mobile phone calls between the bombers as the bomb car was being driven into Omagh. Ray White, former Assistant Chief of RUC Special Branch, said GCHQ had been monitoring mobile phones at their request. He said he believed GCHQ were listening to the phone calls 'live', rather than merely recording them for later. John Ware claimed that a listening device had been hidden in the car and that GCHQ had recordings of what was said. None of this information was given to the RUC in Omagh at the time. Transcripts of the phone calls were later handed over to RUC Special Branch.

=== Independent statutory inquiry ===
In February 2023, Northern Ireland Secretary Chris Heaton-Harris announced an independent statutory inquiry. As opposed to a public inquiry, the chairman would decide which portions of the investigations could be made available to the public and the press. The inquiry will look into four different issues highlighted by a 2021 High Court ruling, namely the handling and sharing of intelligence, the use of mobile phone analysis, the possibility of the existence of advance knowledge of the bomb, and whether the attack could have been prevented by disruption operations.

=== Public inquiry ===
A statutory public inquiry into the Omagh bombing was established in February 2024 under the Inquiries Act 2005, with full hearings beginning on 28 January 2025 following a preliminary session the previous year. Chaired by Lord Turnbull, the inquiry was established by the UK government to examine whether the Real IRA attack could have been prevented by UK state authorities. Its remit does not extend to identifying those responsible for the bombing. Opening statements in June 2025 included testimony from bereaved families, some of whom criticised both the UK and Irish governments for perceived failures in intelligence sharing and cooperation. The inquiry has faced delays due to the slow pace of document disclosure, with Lord Turnbull warning that claims of lost or destroyed records would be subject to rigorous scrutiny. Families have also expressed frustration at the inquiry's limited scope, which excludes preventability by Irish authorities, and have renewed calls for a parallel inquiry in the Republic of Ireland. Although the Irish government has agreed to a memorandum of understanding to provide assistance, victims' representatives have described it as inadequate.

Following the opening statements in June 2025, the inquiry held procedural hearings in July to consider the appointment of Special Advocates for closed sessions involving sensitive security material. Survivors and bereaved families argued that such advocates were essential to ensure representation in hearings from which they would otherwise be excluded. Lord Turnbull acknowledged the complexity of the issue, warning that exclusion risks could undermine public confidence.

In early August 2025, ahead of the 27th anniversary of the bombing, families renewed calls for a parallel inquiry in the Republic of Ireland, with legal action launched in Dublin to compel the Irish government to act. Critics described cross-border cooperation as inadequate and warned that the UK inquiry alone risked delivering only "half a truth". Meanwhile, the Police Service of Northern Ireland confirmed that reviewing legacy material – including 26,000 documents and 2,000 exhibits – would require a six-month reassignment of researchers to avoid multi-year delays. Counsel to the inquiry cautioned against "hindsight bias", and Lord Turnbull reiterated that any claims of lost or destroyed records would be subject to rigorous scrutiny.

A subsequent update hearing reported that almost 4,000 documents – amounting to roughly 65,000 pages – had been provided to Core Participants, with further disclosure continuing as additional material was sought from relevant agencies. Inquiry counsel Paul Greaney KC noted that Westminster had authorised the release of a transcript of confidential evidence given 16 years earlier to the Northern Ireland Affairs Committee by Norman Baxter, the senior police officer who led the original investigation, describing the mechanism used to obtain it as without precedent. The inquiry's opening phase earlier in the year had included a fortnight of testimony from bereaved families and survivors, and the next evidential hearings, scheduled for 9 March 2026, were expected to examine how the attack was planned and carried out and the individuals involved. They were later rescheduled for 21 September 2026.

== Victims' support group ==
The families of the victims of the bomb created the Omagh Support and Self Help Group after the bombing. The organisation is led by Michael Gallagher, whose 21-year-old son, Aidan, was killed in the bombing. Its website provides over 5,000 newspaper articles, video recordings, audio recordings, and other information sources relating to the events leading up to and following the bombing as well as information about other terrorist attacks.

The group's five core objectives are "relief of poverty, sickness, disability of victims", "advancement of education and protection", "raising awareness of needs and experiences of victims, and the effects of terrorism", "welfare rights advice and information", and "improving conditions of life for victims". The group also provides support to victims of other bombings in Ireland, as well other terrorist bombings, such as the 2004 Madrid train bombings. The group has protested outside meetings of the 32 County Sovereignty Movement, an Irish republican political activist group opposed to the Good Friday Agreement that the families believe is part of the RIRA.

In April 2000, the group argued that the attack breached Article 57 of the Geneva Convention and stated that they would pursue the alleged bombers using international law. Michael Gallagher told BBC Radio Ulster that, "The republican movement refused to co-operate and those people hold the key to solving this mystery. Because they have difficulty in working with the RUC and Gardaí, we can't get justice." In January 2002, Gallagher told BBC News that, "There is such a deeply-held sense of frustration and depression" and called the anti-terrorist legislation passed in the wake of the Omagh bombing "ineffective". He expressed support for the controversial Panorama programme, stating that it reminded "people that what happened in Omagh is still capable of happening in other towns".

In February 2002, Prime Minister Tony Blair declined a written request by the group to meet with him at Downing Street. Group members accused the Prime Minister of ignoring concerns about the police's handling of the bombing investigation. A Downing Street spokesman stated that, "The Prime Minister of course understands the relatives' concerns, but [he] believes that a meeting with the Minister of State at the Northern Ireland Office is the right place to air their concerns at this stage."

The death of Adrian Gallagher, along with the experiences of his father Michael and those of other families in the Omagh Support and Self Help Group formed the story of the television film Omagh, a Channel 4-RTÉ co-production. Film-maker Paul Greengrass stated "the families of the Omagh Support and Self Help Group have been in the public eye throughout the last five years, pursuing a legal campaign, shortly to come before the courts, with far-reaching implications for all of us and it feels the right moment for them to be heard, to bring their story to a wider audience so we can all understand the journey they have made." In promotion for the film, Channel 4 stated that the group had pursued "a patient, determined, indomitable campaign to bring those responsible for the bomb to justice, and to hold to account politicians and police on both sides of the border who promised so much in the immediate aftermath of the atrocity but who in the families' eyes have delivered all too little."

== Memorials ==
=== National remembrance ===
A nationwide minute of silence was observed across the Republic of Ireland at 3:10 p.m. on 22 August 1998; exactly one week after the bombing.

=== Omagh memorial ===
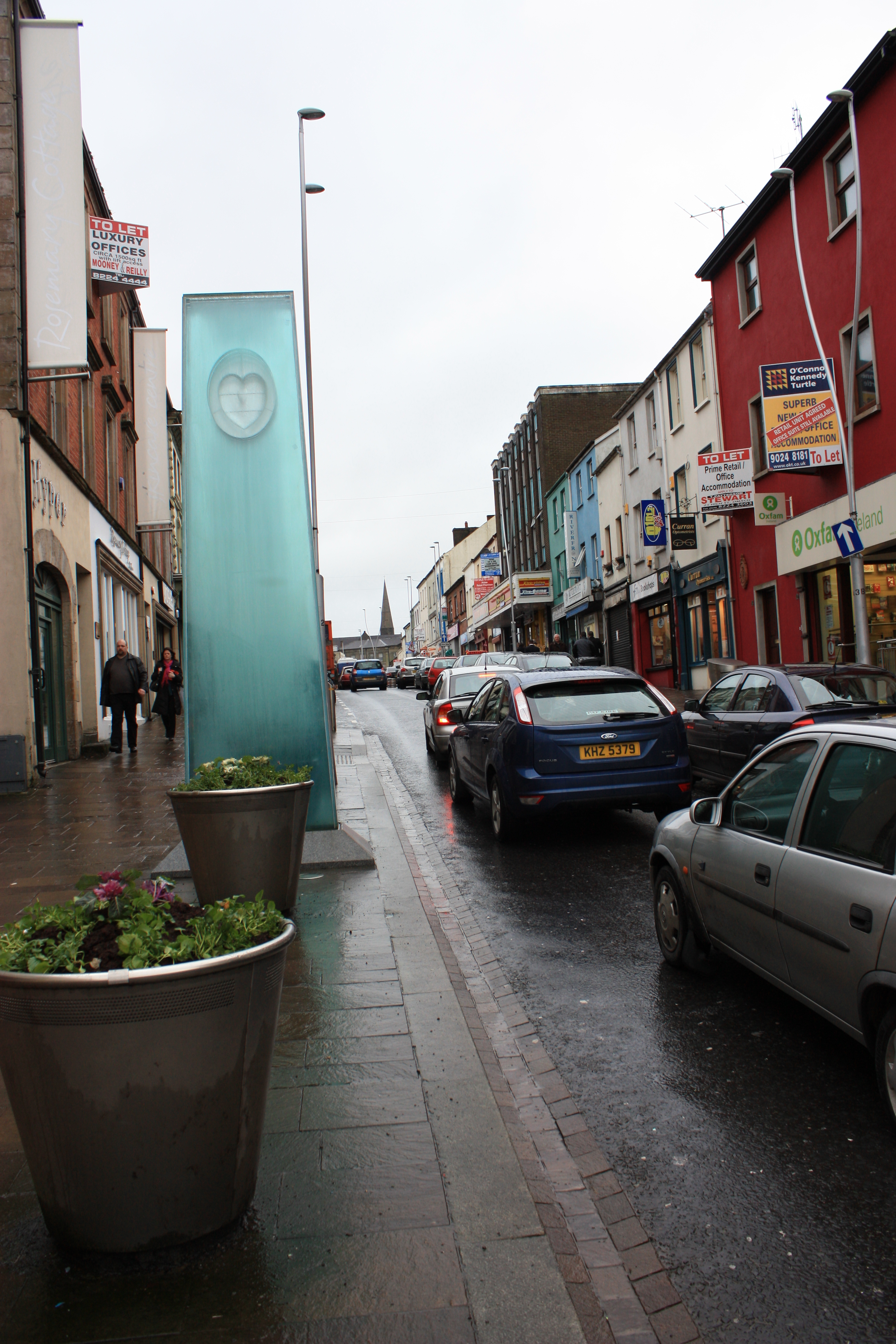
Omagh Memorial at the bomb site

In late 1999, Omagh District Council established the Omagh Memorial Working Group to devise a permanent memorial to the bombing victims. Its members come from both public and private sectors, alongside representatives from the Omagh Churches Forum and members of the victims' families. The council's chief executive, John McKinney, stated in March 2000 that "we are working towards a memorial. It is a very sensitive issue." In April 2007, the council announced the launch of a public art design competition by the Omagh Memorial Working Group. The group's goal was to create a permanent memorial in time for the 10th anniversary of the bombing on 15 August 2008. It had a total budget of £240,000.

As space for a monument on Market Street was limited, the final memorial was to be split between the bombing site and the temporary Memorial Garden about 300 metres away. Artist Sean Hillen and architect Desmond Fitzgerald won the contest with a design that, in the words of the Irish Times, "centres on that most primal yet mobile of elements: light." A heliostat mirror was to be placed in the memorial park, tracking the sun in order to project a constant beam of sunlight onto 31 small mirrors, each etched with the name of a victim. The mirrors were then to bounce the light onto a heart-shaped crystal within an obelisk pillar at the bomb site.

In September 2007, the council's proposed wording on a memorial plaque – "dissident republican car bomb" – brought it into conflict with several of the victims' families. Michael Gallagher stated that "there can be no ambiguity over what happened on 15 August 1998, and no dancing around words can distract from the truth." The Council appointed an independent mediator in an attempt to reach an agreement with those families. Construction started on the memorial on 27 July 2008.

On 15 August 2008, a memorial service was held in Omagh. Senior government representatives from the UK, the Republic of Ireland and the Stormont Assembly attended, along with relatives of many of the victims. A number of bereaved families boycotted the service and held their own service the following Sunday. They argued that the Sinn Féin-dominated Omagh council would not acknowledge that republicans were responsible for the bombing.

A memorial service was held on 15 August 2018 to mark 20 years since the bombing. A bell was rung 32 times at 15:10, the time the bomb went off, to represent the 31 victims, with an extra peal for those who have lost their lives in attacks around the world. A memorial service was also held on 13 August 2023 to mark the 25th anniversary of the bombing.

=== Media memorials ===
The bombing inspired the song "Paper Sun" by British hard rock band Def Leppard.

Another song inspired by the bombings was "Peace on Earth" by rock group U2. It includes the line, "They're reading names out over the radio. All the folks the rest of us won't get to know. Sean and Julia, Gareth, Ann, and Breda." The five names mentioned are five of the victims from this attack. Another line, "She never got to say goodbye, To see the colour in his eyes, now he's in the dirt" was about how James Barker, a victim, was remembered by his mother Donna Barker in an article in the Irish Times after the bombing in Omagh. U2 guitarist The Edge has described the song as "the most bitter song U2 has ever written". The names of all 29 people killed during the bombing were recited at the conclusion of the group's anti-violence anthem "Sunday Bloody Sunday" during the Elevation Tour; one performance is captured on the concert video U2 Go Home: Live from Slane Castle, Ireland.

Irish state broadcaster RTÉ and UK network Channel 4 co-produced the 2004 film Omagh dramatising the events surrounding the bombing and its aftermath. It was directed by Pete Travis and was first shown on television in both countries in May 2004.

== See also ==
- Timeline of Real IRA actions
- Timeline of the Northern Ireland Troubles
- The Troubles in Omagh

== Sources ==
- Darby, John (2001). The effects of violence on peace processes. United States Institute of Peace Press. ISBN 978-1-929223-31-2.
- Mooney, John; O'Toole, Michael (2004). Black Operations: The Secret War Against the Real IRA. Maverick House. ISBN 0-9542945-9-9.
- de Burgh, Hugo (2008). Investigative Journalism: Context and Practice. Routledge. ISBN 978-0-415-44144-5.
