= Tyrone and Fermanagh Hospital =

- Western Health and Social Care Trust
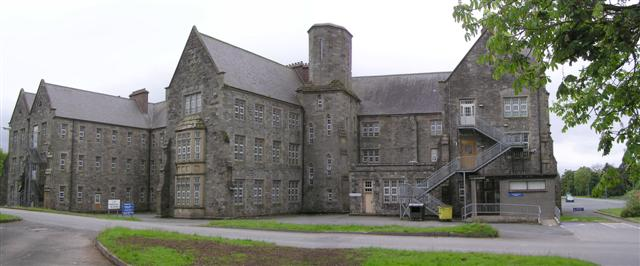
- Tyrone and Fermanagh Hospital

- Location in Northern Ireland

Geography
- Location: Omagh, County Tyrone, Northern Ireland
- Coordinates: 54.5934°N 7.2680°W

Organisation
- Care system: Health and Social Care in Northern Ireland
- Type: Specialist

Services
- Speciality: Mental health

History
- Founded: 1853

Links
- Website: www.westerntrust.hscni.net/1584.htm

The Tyrone and Fermanagh Hospital is a mental health facility in Omagh, County Tyrone, Northern Ireland. It is managed by the Western Health and Social Care Trust.

== History ==
The hospital was commissioned as an initiative of the gentry of the counties of Tyrone and Fermanagh in the early 19th century. It was designed by William Farrell in the Elizabethan Gothic style and opened as the Omagh District Lunatic Asylum in 1853. Although it was originally intended to accommodate 300 patients, this proved inadequate and additional buildings were erected and the east and west wings were both extended in the 1860s. By the 1930s the facility had become the Tyrone and Fermanagh Hospital. Following the introduction of Care in the Community in the early 1980s the hospital went into a period of decline and wards have been scheduled for closure.
