= IRA Quartermaster General =

Rank in the Provisional Irish Republican Army

The IRA Quartermaster General (QMG) oversaw the acquisition, concealment and maintenance of weaponry for the Irish Republican Army since its foundation in 1919. His department worked closely with the Engineering in the development of weapons.

A number of people held the post of IRA QMG. In 1997, the then QMG, Michael McKevitt, broke away from the Provisional IRA to form the Real IRA, taking weaponry to his breakaway organisation.

== List of Quartermasters General of the Irish Republican Army (1917–1922) ==
No.	Name	Assumed position	Left position	Source
	Michael Staines	1917	March 1920	
	Fintan Murphy	March 1920	December 1920	
	Seán MacMahon	December 1920	February 1922	

== List of Quartermasters Generals of the (anti-Treaty) Irish Republican Army (1922–1969) ==
- Liam Mellows, 1922
- Sean O'Muirthile, 1923–1924
- Andrew Cooney, July 1924–1925
- Seán Russell, 1927–1936
- Mick Fitzpatrick, 1936–1937
- James Hannegan, from 1937
- Charlie McGlade, from 1941
- Harry White, 1942–1943
- Archie Doyle, 1940s
- Larry Grogan, from c. 1950
- Cathal Goulding, 1959–1962
- Mick Ryan, from 1962
  (also first QMG of the Official IRA from 1969)
- Jimmy Quigley, from 1966
- Pat Regan, late 1960s

== List of Quartermasters Generals of the Provisional Irish Republican Army (1969–2005) ==
- Dáithí Ó Conaill, 1969
- Jack McCabe, 1969–1971
- Denis McInerney, 1971–1972
- Patrick Ryan, 1972–1973
- Brian Keenan, from 1973
- Frank Hegarty, 1980s
- Kevin Hannaway, to 1985
- Michael McKevitt, 1985–1997

== See also ==
- Irish Republican Army
- Chief of Staff of the Irish Republican Army
- IRA Director of Intelligence
