= Michael McKevitt =

Irish republican and paramilitary leader (1949–2021)

- Mícheál Mac Dhaibhéid
- Born: 4 September 1949; County Louth, Ireland
- Died: 2 January 2021 (aged 71)
- Spouse: Bernadette Sands McKevitt
- Family: Bobby Sands (brother-in-law)
- Military career
- Allegiance: Provisional IRA; Real IRA; New Republican Forum
- Service years: 1970s–1997 (Provisional IRA); 1998–2002 (Real IRA); 2003 (New Republican Forum)
- Rank: Provisional IRA: Quartermaster General

Michael McKevitt (Irish: Mícheál Mac Dhaibhéid) (4 September 1949 – 2 January 2021) was an Irish republican and paramilitary leader. He was the Provisional Irish Republican Army's Quartermaster General. Due to the Provisional IRA's involvement in the Northern Ireland peace process, he formed the Real IRA in protest. His role in the Real IRA led to him being convicted of directing terrorism as the leader of the paramilitary organisation.

== Background ==
=== Provisional Irish Republican Army ===
McKevitt was a native of County Louth. He joined the Provisional IRA during the outbreak of the Troubles. In February 1975, he was shot in the knees by the Official IRA during a feud between the two organisations. He was a longtime senior member of the Provisional IRA and served as the organisation's Quartermaster General, with oversight of their arms caches. He quit the organisation in protest at the movement's ceasefires and its participation through Sinn Féin in the Northern Ireland peace process, which led to the Good Friday Agreement in 1998.

=== Real Irish Republican Army ===
McKevitt launched a dissident offshoot of the Provisional IRA called the Real IRA, using seized Provisional IRA weaponry, and is believed to have been the group's first Chief of Staff.

McKevitt was expelled from the Real IRA after a disagreement between a group of Real IRA prisoners in Portlaoise Prison and the outside leadership. The prisoners issued a statement urging the leadership to stand down, claiming a criminal element had taken over. McKevitt and his supporters went on to form a group called the New Republican Forum.

==== Omagh bombing ====
In June 2009, McKevitt was one of four men a civil court found liable for the 1998 Omagh bombing, in a civil action suit brought by relatives of the victims. In April 2014, The Telegraph revealed that McKevitt and Liam Campbell were appealing against the ruling in the European Court of Human Rights, citing their inability to cross-examine testimony of FBI source David Rupert as a violation of their right to a fair trial.

== Arrests, convictions, and appeals ==
McKevitt was convicted by the Republic of Ireland's non-jury Special Criminal Court on 6 August 2003 of two offences: "membership of an illegal organisation" (the Real IRA) and "directing terrorism" between 29 August 1999 and 23 October 2000. On 7 August 2003 he was sentenced to twenty years in prison. During his trial Mr Justice Richard Johnson said of McKevitt, "The accused played a leading role in the organisation which he directed and induced others to join." Given all possible reductions and remission, it means that the earliest he could have been released was 2016. The prosecution's case was based largely on the testimony of an American FBI informant, David Rupert. According to information revealed in his trial, among his plans was to attempt the assassination of the then British Prime Minister Tony Blair.

McKevitt appealed against his convictions to the Court of Criminal Appeal, arguing that Rupert's testimony was unreliable since he had been paid large sums of money for his role as an informant (a total of £750,000 from the FBI and MI5), and because of Rupert's long criminal record. In December 2005, the court rejected these arguments and said that Rupert was a credible witness. Both of McKevitt's convictions were upheld. In July 2006, McKevitt was given leave to appeal to the Supreme Court. The appeal was rejected on 30 July 2008.

In February 2014, The Court of Criminal Appeal heard a petition from McKevitt arguing that he should receive a new appeal based on a Supreme Court decision in 2012 which ruled an unrelated Garda search of a suspect's home illegal. On 20 May 2014, the Court of Criminal Appeal rejected McKevitt's bid to have his new appeal heard by the Supreme Court.

In August 2014, McKevitt petitioned for release on the grounds that, per Rule 59 (2) of prison rules, McKevitt has not been given proper consideration by prison authorities for a one third remission of sentence taking into account model inmate behavior, due to his conviction being under the Offences Against the State Act. On 1 September 2014, McKevitt withdrew his appeal and was granted release to prepare a new challenge based on judicial review. On 9 December 2014 his challenge was struck down by Dublin's High Court.

== Release ==
In March 2015, McKevitt was granted temporary release in order to treat a cancerous growth on his kidney. Subsequently, McKevitt underwent surgery to have the affected kidney surgically removed in May of the same year.

On Easter Sunday 2016, McKevitt was formally released from prison upon the completion of his sentence.

== Personal life and death ==
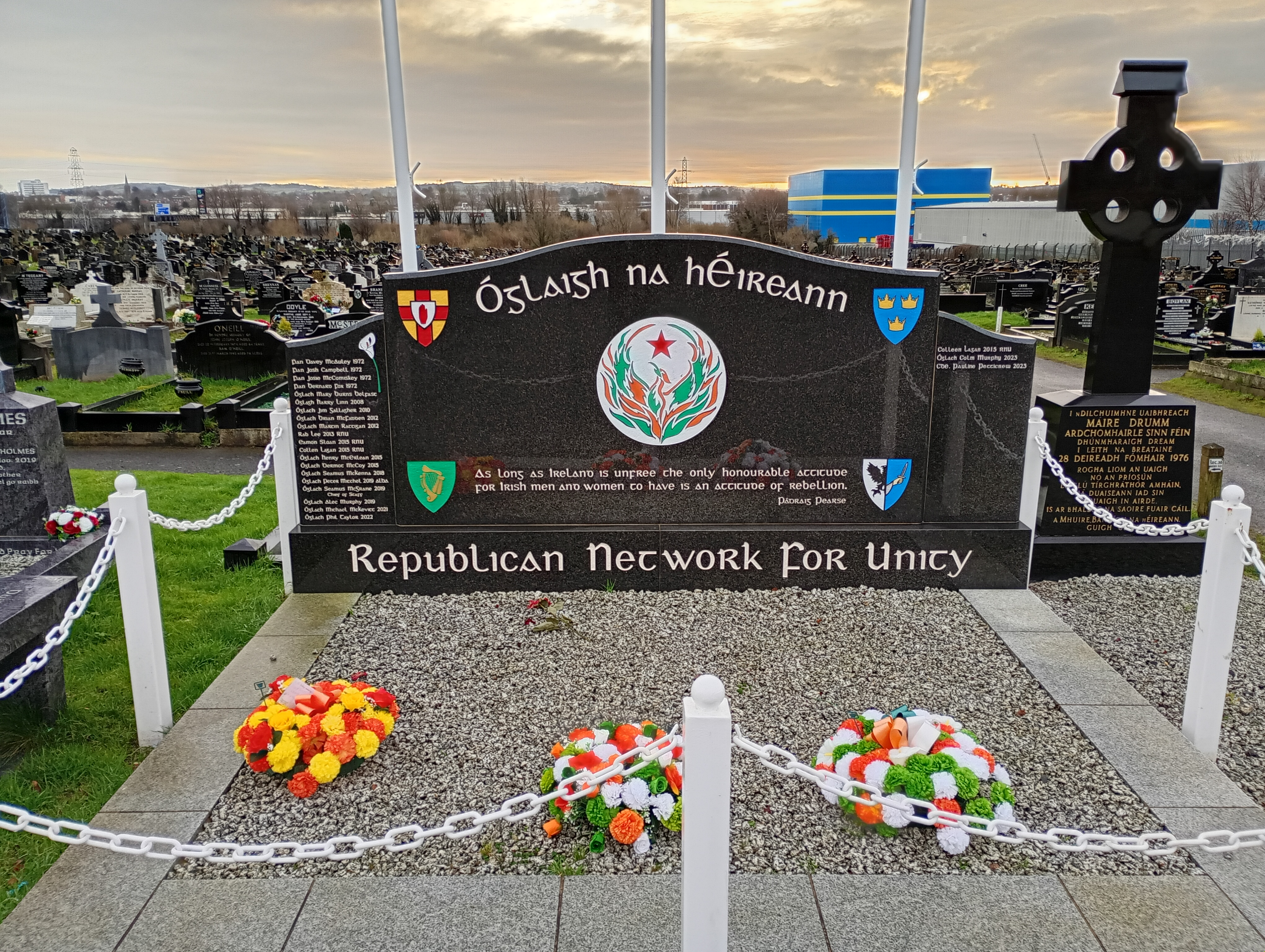
McKevitt appears on the Republican Network for Unity memorial in Milltown Cemetery, Belfast

McKevitt was married to Bernadette Sands McKevitt, a sister of 1981 Provisional IRA hunger striker and Member of Parliament (MP), Bobby Sands, who died during his hunger strike. Sands McKevitt was a leading member of the 32 County Sovereignty Movement and had been described in media reports as the third highest ranking Real IRA officer. She left the 32 County Sovereignty Movement following the imprisonment of her husband.

McKevitt died from cancer on 2 January 2021, aged 71.
