= Éamonn O'Doherty (Irish republican) =

Irish republican (1939–1999)

- Éamonn Ó Dochartaigh
- Born: 1939; Carrick-on-Suir, County Tipperary, Ireland
- Died: 27 October 1999 (aged 59–60); Carrick-on-Suir, County Tipperary, Ireland
- Military career
- Allegiance: Irish Republic
- Branch: Irish Republican Army (1958–1969); Provisional IRA (1969–1986)
- Rank: Officer Commanding; Chief of Staff (1974)
- Units: South Fermanagh Brigade (1970–1973); General Headquarters Staff (GHQ) (from 1973)
- Conflicts: Border Campaign; The Troubles

Éamonn O'Doherty (Irish: Éamonn Ó Dochartaigh; 1939 – 27 October 1999) was an Irish republican and one-time chief of staff of the Provisional Irish Republican Army (IRA). During the 1986 split, he supported Republican Sinn Féin.

== Biography ==
O'Doherty joined the IRA in 1958 in his native Carrick-on-Suir, County Tipperary, and participated in the Border Campaign.

In 1970, he went to Northern Ireland and was attached to the South Fermanagh Battalion of the Provisional IRA and later became Officer Commanding (OC) of the IRA in the Fermanagh/Monaghan/Armagh area.

In 1973, he was promoted to the IRA General Headquarters Staff (GHQ) and after the arrest of Séamus Twomey later that year, he was appointed chief of staff. He remained in this position until his own arrest and imprisonment in Portlaoise Prison in 1974.

After his release, he resumed his work with the IRA GHQ and after a year he was sent on a mission to the USA, where he was arrested and detained for one year. He subsequently undertook a number of missions in various parts of the world on behalf of the IRA.

In 1985, he wrote a book entitled The IRA at War.

In the 1986 split in the republican movement, O'Doherty sided with Republican Sinn Féin and refused to recognise the legitimacy of Dáil Éireann in Leinster House. O'Doherty felt that the decision to recognise the Republic of Ireland was a "greater treachery even than Collins and company".

He died, aged 60, in Carrick-on-Suir.

== Books ==
- O'Doherty, Eamonn, The IRA at War: 1916 to the Present. An Illustrated History, Cork: Mercier, 1985, ISBN 0-85342-753-4
