= Altnagelvin Area Hospital =

- Western Health and Social Care Trust
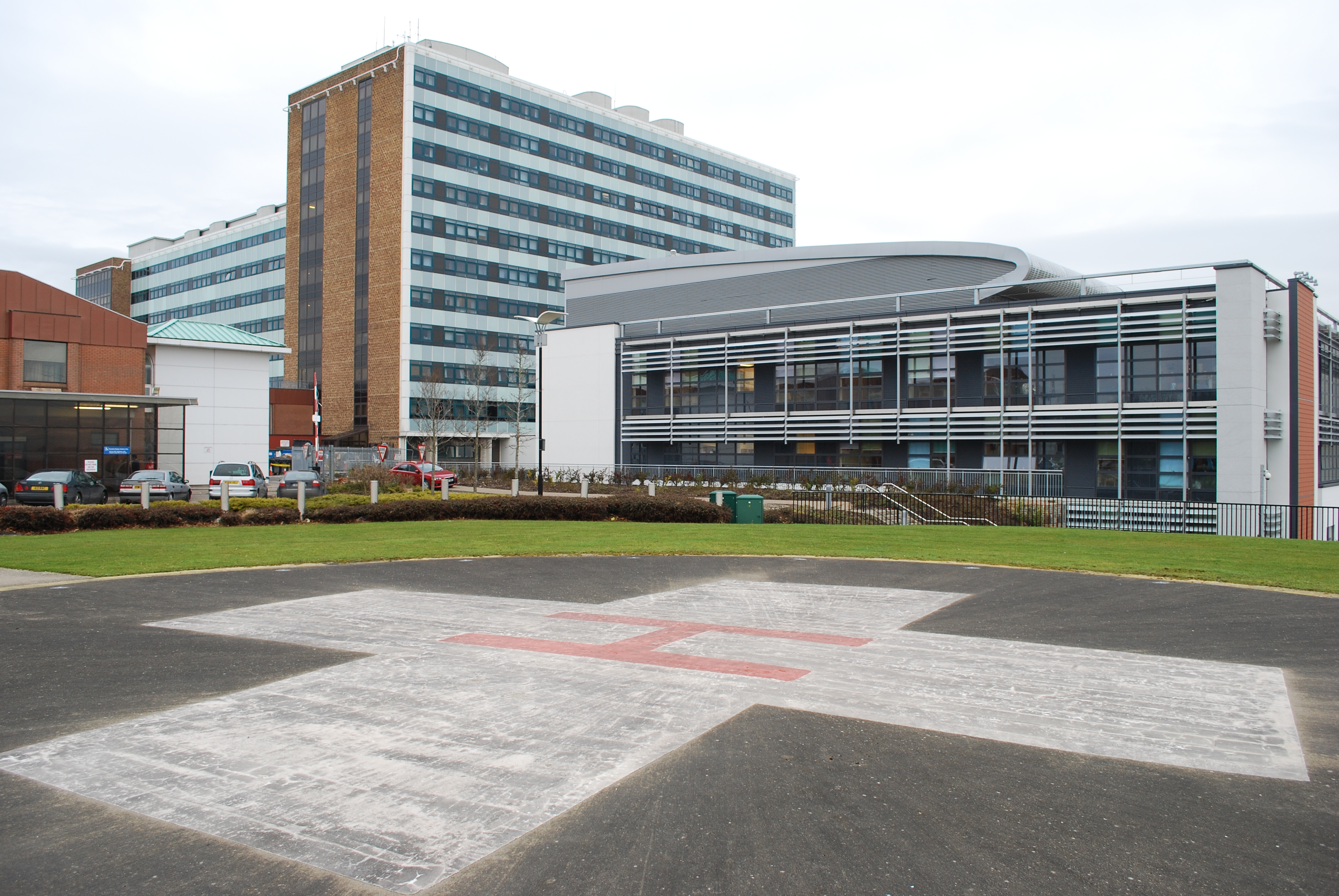
- The tower block at Altnagelvin Area Hospital

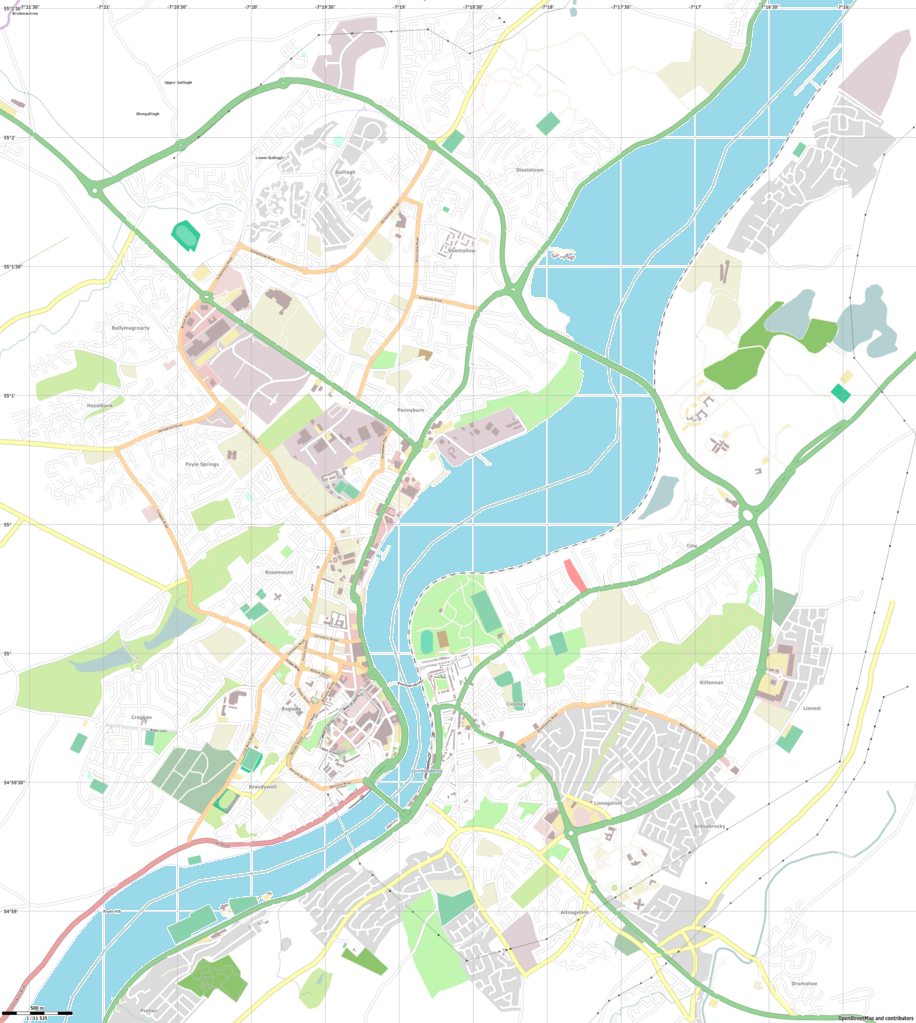
- Location in Derry

Geography
- Location: Glenshane Road, Derry, Northern Ireland
- Coordinates: 54.985°N 7.295°W

Organisation
- Care system: Health and Social Care in Northern Ireland
- Type: General
- Affiliated university: Queen's University Belfast; National University of Ireland, Galway; Ulster University

Services
- Emergency department: Yes
- Beds: 500

History
- Founded: 1960

Links
- Website: westerntrust.hscni.net/hospitals/altnagelvin-area-hospital/

Altnagelvin Area Hospital is the main hospital for the North West of Northern Ireland. It is located in Waterside, Derry. It provides services to the city of Derry and County Londonderry, but also some specialist and acute services for parts of neighbouring County Donegal, County Tyrone, County Antrim and County Fermanagh. It is managed by the Western Health and Social Care Trust.

== History ==
Altnagelvin Area Hospital was the first major hospital built in the United Kingdom after the Second World War and opened in 1960.

In February 2003 the hospital was designated as one of the nine acute hospitals in the acute hospital network of Northern Ireland on which healthcare would be focused under the government health policy 'Developing Better Services'.

A new renal hemodialysis unit was completed in 2005 and a new laboratory and pharmacy centre, procured under a private finance initiative contract, opened in 2007. A new south wing, designed by HLM Architects and built at a cost of £45 million, was completed in 2010.

In January 2011, it was revealed that 18,500 xrays taken in 2009 and 2010 in Altnagelvin's Medical Imaging Department had not been examined by a radiologist. As a result, four patients with cancer had their diagnosis delayed by several months.

In March 2011 a political row developed when Health Minister Michael McGimpsey announced the postponement of plans to develop a regional radiotherapy unit at the hospital.

== Ambulance services ==
The Western Division of the Northern Ireland Ambulance Service (NIAS) is headquartered at the Ambulance Station that is located within the hospital grounds.

== University affiliations ==
The hospital is a teaching hospital, and has research and teaching links with Queen's University Belfast, the National University of Ireland, Galway and Ulster University.
