= Western Health and Social Care Trust =

State health organisation in Northern Ireland

- Type: Health and social care trust
- Established: 1 August 2006
- Headquarters: Glenshane Road; Derry; BT47 6SB
- Hospitals: Altnagelvin Area Hospital; Gransha Park; Tyrone and Fermanagh Hospital; Omagh Hospital and Primary Care Complex; South West Acute Hospital
- Staff: 9,690 (2018/19)
- Website: westerntrust.hscni.net

The Western Health and Social Care Trust is a health organisation in Northern Ireland. Hospitals served by the Trust include Altnagelvin Area Hospital, Waterside Hospital, Lakeview Hospital, Roe Valley Hospital, Grangewood, North West Cancer Centre, Tyrone and Fermanagh Hospital, Omagh Hospital and Primary Care Complex and the South West Acute Hospital.

== History ==
The trust was established as the Western Health and Social Services Trust on 1 August 2006, and became operational on 1 April 2007. In September 2021, the trust made an appeal off-duty nurses to return to work to deal with the backlog of clinical cases.

== Population ==
The area covered by Western Health and Social Care Trust has a population of 294,417 residents according to the 2011 Northern Ireland census.
