= Seamus Daly =

Irish republican

Seamus Daly (Irish: Séamus Ó Dálaigh) is an Irish republican from Kilmurray, Castleblayney, County Monaghan. He was charged with being a member of the Real Irish Republican Army (RIRA) in Dublin's Special Criminal Court in 2004, pleaded guilty and was sentenced to 3 1/2 years in prison.

In 2009, he appeared in Carrickmacross District Court for failing to produce insurance and driving without a licence at Tullyvaragh, Carrickmacross and also failing to produce insurance and a driving licence when stopped in Carrickmacross Court car park. He received a 12-month driving ban and a €3,250 fine.

== Background ==
He is a builder from Cullaville, County Armagh.

== Omagh bombing ==
In 2009, Daly, along with three other Real IRA members, were ruled to be civilly liable for the Omagh bombing and ordered by a Belfast court to pay £1.5 million to the victims of the attack. All four men refused.

On 10 April 2014, arising out of the police investigation into the Omagh bombing, Daly was charged with the murder of 29 people in Omagh in 1998, two charges linked to the explosion and two counts linked to an attempted explosion in Lisburn in April 1998. He appeared in court on 11 April and was remanded in custody due to the possibility he may flee the jurisdiction. On 6 May, Daly's case was adjourned for four weeks at the prosecutor's request.

In February 2015 Northern Ireland's Director of Public Prosecutions ordered that Daly face charges "both for the Omagh bomb and Lisburn bomb and the charges associated with those two incidents." After their star witness contradicted himself in a pre-trial hearing, prosecutors in the North dropped all charges against Daly.

Since his arrest in 2014, Daly's family and friends maintained his innocence. A committee was established in 2014 to work on highlighting the case, and released a number of statements. A website and social media campaign was established in July 2015 to highlight his ongoing imprisonment, which campaigners described as "the age old tactic of internment by remand."

He was released from Maghaberry high-security prison in County Antrim on 1 March 2016.
