= Pearse Kelly =

Irish journalist and republican activist

- Born: 14 October 1916; Dungannon, County Tyrone
- Died: 6 April 1974 (aged 57)
- Other name: Paul Kelso
- Occupations: Journalist and republican activist
- Known for: Officer Commanding the Belfast Brigade of the Irish Republican Army

Patrick Pearse Kelly (14 October 1916 – 6 April 1974), also known as Paul Kelso, was an Irish journalist and republican activist.

== Biography ==
Born in Dungannon in County Tyrone, Kelly began working as a journalist at the Dungannon Observer, before moving to the Tyrone Courier and then working as a freelancer for the Irish Press. A group of his friends from school had bonded over Irish language lessons and, inspired by seeing British troops readying for action World War II, they considered forming their own republican paramilitary group. However, they decided in late 1939 or early 1940 to instead all join the local Irish Republican Army (IRA), in the hope that this would reinvigorate it, and that its name and tradition would prove useful. Kelly, personally, was also inspired by attending future IRA Chief of Staff Eoin McNamee's trial as a reporter.

Following training, Kelly's friends burnt down a hall which was being used to drill British troops. Kelly was quickly marked out as a leader, establishing a "Republican police" locally to crack down on local nuisance behaviour. They beat up a group of people involved in this, increasing local regard for the IRA. As a result, he was ordered to Belfast, where he was appointed as the Officer Commanding its Belfast Battalion early in 1941. There, he obtained a code being used by British forces, which they had carelessly left in a chemists' shop run by an IRA sympathiser. This was then returned to the troops without arousing suspicion, enabling the IRA to crack British messages for some time, although it did not ultimately lead to any useful results for the organisation. A few months later, he was called to Dublin to take part in the IRA's investigation of its chief of staff, Stephen Hayes. In July, he was selected as Hayes' replacement, but in November in company of the German spy Hermann Görtz, he was arrested and subsequently interned at the Curragh.

At the Curragh, Kelly took over as Officer Commanding republican internees, although his predecessor, Liam Leddy, refused to recognise him, leading to an ongoing rift. However, Kelly increasingly won over internees, and proved successful in improving their conditions, ending physical punishments, increasing education and starting concerts and sporting activities.

Kelly was released in 1946 and found work at the Irish Independent. He remained there until 1958, when he was appointed editor of the Evening Herald, then in 1961 he became the Head of News for Raidió Teilifís Éireann. A dispute arose in 1966 when Kelly approved a news item which showed Minister for Agriculture Charles Haughey contradicting Rickard Deasy, President of the National Farmers' Association, and Minister for Posts and Telegraphs Joseph Brennan stated that he would have censored the item had he known about it. Kelly resigned and instead found work with the Bord Fáilte.

Military offices
Preceded by Liam Rice	Officer Commanding the Belfast Brigade of the Irish Republican Army; 1941	Succeeded by Hugh Matthews
