= First Amendment of the Constitution of Ireland =

Amendment on the definition of war

The First Amendment of the Constitution Act 1939 amended the Constitution of Ireland to extend the definition of "time of war" to include a war in which the state is a non-belligerent. It allowed the government to exercise emergency powers during World War II, in which the state remained neutral. It was introduced and signed into law on 2 September 1939, the day after the German invasion of Poland. The war period within Ireland is called the Emergency.

== Background ==
Article 28.3.3° of the constitution grants the state sweeping powers during a state of emergency, but in the form in which the article was adopted in 1937, they could be invoked only during a "time of war or armed rebellion". The First Amendment specified that "time of war" could include an armed conflict in which the state was not actually taking part.

On 2 September 1939, the amendment bill was introduced in Dáil Éireann by Éamon de Valera, who was Taoiseach in the Fianna Fáil government. The bill was passed by both houses of the Oireachtas (Dáil Éireann at 4pm and Seanad Éireann at 5.45pm) and signed into law at 6pm by Douglas Hyde, the first President of Ireland. Unlike most constitutional amendments, the bill was not submitted to a referendum; Article 51 of the transitory provisions of the constitution allowed this exception during the first three years of Hyde's presidency.

== Changes to the text ==
Addition of the text in bold to Article 28.3.3°:

3° Nothing in this Constitution shall be invoked to invalidate any law enacted by the Oireachtas which is expressed to be for the purpose of securing the public safety and the preservation of the State in time of war or armed rebellion, or to nullify any act done or purporting to be done in pursuance of any such law. In this sub-section "time of war" includes a time when there is taking place an armed conflict in which the State is not a participant but in respect of which each of the Houses of the Oireachtas shall have resolved that, arising out of such armed conflict, a national emergency exists affecting the vital interests of the State.

== Legislation ==
As soon as the president had signed the amendment bill into law, each house of the Oireachtas passed a resolution that a time of war existed within the revised meaning of Article 28.3.3°. The Emergency Powers Bill was then introduced and in the early hours of 3 September it was signed into law. It granted sweeping powers to the government which would have been unconstitutional if the exception provided by Article 28.3.3° were not in force. Further Emergency Powers Acts were passed over the course of World War II extending "the Emergency".

== Doubts over legality ==
=== Expedited signature ===
The constitution provides that a bill must be signed into law by the President at least five (and at most seven) days after it has been passed by both houses of the Oireachtas, unless an early signature is requested by the government and confirmed by a resolution of the Seanad. There was an exception for bills to amend the constitution, because those would ordinarily be subject to a referendum between passage by the houses and signature by the President. It was unclear how this exception interacted with the Article 51 exception to the requirement for a referendum: if a constitutional amendment bill did not have a referendum, was the five-day waiting period required? No early signature motion was passed on 2 September for the First Amendment bill, de Valera having told the Seanad it was unnecessary. (Note: The Seanad did pass an early signature motion for the Emergency Powers Bill.)

In 1940, Paddy McGrath and Thomas Harte, members of the Irish Republican Army, were sentenced to death by a military court established under the Emergency Powers (Amendment) (No. 2) Act 1940. They took a judicial review claiming that the First Amendment bill was not legally enacted because Hyde had not waited five days. The High Court and Supreme Court rejected their argument and they were duly executed by firing squad. Jurist John M. Kelly has disputed the courts' verdict. Gerard Hogan suggests that "after the events of State (Burke) v Lennon the previous December, a degree of legal realism had set in and the courts were no longer in the mood ... for judicial activism in cases of this kind so long as the very survival of the country was at stake."

=== Irish text ===
The First Amendment was passed only in English and amended only the English-language text of the constitution. (Note: An official Irish translation was published as required by Article 25.4.5° of the constitution, but this did not have the force of law.) This meant the English and Irish texts were inconsistent. The constitution's transitory provisions provided that "In case of conflict between the Irish and the English texts, the Irish text shall prevail", but only in relation to the original version enrolled in 1938; there was no corresponding provision in relation to subsequent amendments. The doubt over whether the 1939 amendment had force was not tested in court.

The Second Amendment of the Constitution was an omnibus amendment passed in 1941 (also without referendum, under Article 51) whose own text was in both English and Irish and which amended the English and Irish texts of the constitution. Among its many changes were:

- amending the Irish-language text of Article 28.3.3° to match the addition made by the First Amendment to the English text
- providing that the constitution should be re-enrolled after amendments
- extending the precedence of the Irish version to amendments

Despite the Second Amendment's putative remediation of the deficiencies of the First Amendment, John M. Kelly has raised a continuing doubt over its validity, on the theory that only an Irish-language statute can amend the Irish-language text.

== Later amendments ==
Article 28.3.3° was amended on two further occasions. The Second Amendment of 1941 clarified that emergency provisions must be within the time of war or armed rebellion itself and added a clause at the end of the last sentence, which specified that a "time of war" could extend beyond the termination of hostilities. (The emergency declared in 1939 was not formally ended until 1976, although no emergency laws were in force after 1946. A new emergency was immediately declared in place of the old one in response to the Troubles in Northern Ireland; it was ended in 1995 as part of the peace process.)

The Twenty-first Amendment, passed in 2001, prohibited the use of the death penalty in a new subsection in Article 15.5.2°, and provided that the emergency provisions of the constitution could not be used to allow the death penalty. Those later changes to Article 28.3.3° are highlighted in bold:

3° Nothing in this Constitution other than Article 15.5.2° shall be invoked to invalidate any law enacted by the Oireachtas which is expressed to be for the purpose of securing the public safety and the preservation of the State in time of war or armed rebellion, or to nullify any act done or purporting to be done in time of war or armed rebellion in pursuance of any such law. In this subsection "time of war" includes a time when there is taking place an armed conflict in which the State is not a participant but in respect of which each of the Houses of the Oireachtas shall have resolved that, arising out of such armed conflict, a national emergency exists affecting the vital interests of the State and "time of war or armed rebellion" includes such time after the termination of any war, or of any such armed conflict as aforesaid, or of an armed rebellion, as may elapse until each of the Houses of the Oireachtas shall have resolved that the national emergency occasioned by such war, armed conflict, or armed rebellion has ceased to exist.

== See also ==
- State of Emergency
- Politics of the Republic of Ireland
- History of the Republic of Ireland

== Sources ==
=== Primary sources ===
Oireachtas

- "First Amendment of the Constitution Bill, 1939 (Bill 27 of 1939)". Bills. Oireachtas. [Bill text and Debates]

Irish Statute Book

- Constitution of Ireland
- First Amendment of the Constitution Act 1939
- Emergency Powers Act 1939
- Second Amendment of the Constitution Act 1941
- Emergency Powers Act 1976

Court cases

- Re Harte and McGrath, 1941 I. R. 68 (Supreme Court 26 August 1941).

=== Secondary sources ===
- Kelly, J. M. (1984). The Irish Constitution (2nd ed.). Dublin: Jurist. p. 144.
- Hogan, Gerard; Whyte, Gerry (2003). J. M. Kelly; The Irish Constitution (4th ed.). LexisNexis Butterworths. p. 396. ISBN 9 781854 758958.
- Hogan, Gerard W.; Kinsella, Eoin (2012). The Origins of the Irish Constitution: 1928–1941. Royal Irish Academy. ISBN 9781904890751.
