= Maurice O'Neill (Irish republican) =

Irish activist (executed 1942)

Maurice O'Neill (1917-1942) was an Irish Republican Army (IRA) Captain, captured in 1942 after a shoot out with Irish police (Garda Síochána), and promptly tried and executed. He was one of only two people executed in independent Ireland for a non-murder offence.

== Background ==
O'Neill was a farmer from an Irish republican family in the farming community of Caherciveen, County Kerry. He and his older brother Sean were dedicated Irish republicans. Maurice O'Neill fought in the Irish Republican Army's 1942-44 Northern Campaign and was assigned to the IRA's General Headquarters (GHQ) at the time of his capture. In the early 1930s, O'Neills brother Sean served in the IRAs Dublin Brigade and served on GHQ Staff IRA in various capacities from 1945 to 1955.

== Arrest ==
On 24 October 1942, Maurice O'Neill was arrested after a raid by the Irish Police in which Garda Detective Officer Mordant was shot and killed in Donnycarney, Dublin. The mission of the police raid was the capture of Harry White – the IRA Quartermaster General. White escaped capture and O'Neill was arrested but not charged with the murder of the Detective Officer but with "shooting with intent". It is thought that the Detective Officer Mordants death may have been a result of cross fire between Special Branch policemen.

== Trial and execution ==
In 1939 the Irish legislature, the Oireachtas, passed the Offences against the State Acts 1939–1998, which established Special Criminal Courts. O'Neill was promptly tried in a Military Court and found guilty of a capital offence. Sentenced to death, and with no appeal provided for in the relevant law, he was executed on 12 November 1942, just 19 days after his arrest, by the Irish Army in Mountjoy Prison. O'Neill's body was buried in the grounds of the prison. O'Neill was one of seven IRA men executed in Ireland between September 1940 and December 1944: Patrick McGrath, Thomas Harte, Richard Goss, George Plant, and Maurice O'Neill were executed by firing squad, while two others were hanged – Tom Williams in Crumlin Road Gaol, Belfast and Charlie Kerins in Mountjoy Prison, Dublin. Maurice O'Neill and Richard Goss were the only people executed by the Irish state for a non-murder crime.

O'Neill's execution provoked particularly widespread protests, as he was a popular figure in his native Kerry. The 25 year old O'Neill apparently was stoic and calm when his fate became clear. In a letter to his elder brother Sean from Arbour Hill Prison, he wrote: "I suppose you saw in the papers where I met my Waterloo last Saturday night. Well, such are the fortunes of war...there is only one sentence, death or release. So I believe it is the full penalty for me. There is no good in having false hopes, hard facts must be faced." In his last letter to his father O'Neill wrote: "I am glad that I am not being reprieved as the thought of the torture I would have to endure in Portlaoise makes me shudder."

Many Irish republican prisoners were released in 1948 as was the body of O'Neill (on 17 Sep 1948). Volunteer O'Neill is buried in the Republican plot at Kilavarnogue Cemetery, Cahersiveen, County Kerry, Ireland. O'Neill's name is listed on a monument in Fairview Park, Dublin with the names other IRA members of that period who lost their lives. The Maurice O'Neill Bridge to Valentia Island was built in 1970 and named in memory of the young farmer who had been executed in 1942. In Kilflynn, County Kerry the Crotta O'Neill's Hurling club is named after him. In 2011 an Irish television documentary focused on how O'Neill's execution affected his family.

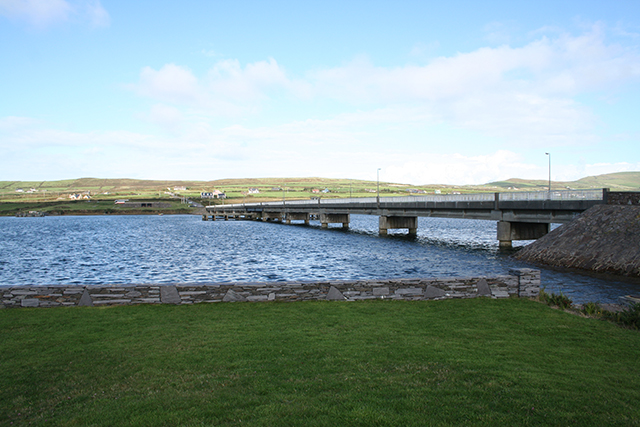
Maurice O'Neill Bridge
