= Richard Goss =

Irish Republican

Richard (Richie) Goss (1915–1941) was an executed Irish Republican born to Patrick Goss and Margaret Clinton who had married at Inniskeen Roman Catholic Church In 1909 . His parents were both Roman Catholic as is shown in the 1911 census despite the misinformation that he himself was one of the few Protestant members of the Irish Republican Army (IRA) in the 1940s. Goss was a leader in a major bombing and sabotage campaign in England (1939–40), known as the S-Plan

== Background ==
Richard Goss was from Dundalk and joined the North Louth Battalion of the IRA at age 18. Goss was arrested several times for his IRA activities and (in 1941) was arrested and shortly thereafter executed by the Irish Defence Forces (at age 26).

== S-Plan and Arrest ==
In early 1938, the then IRA Chief of Staff, Sean Russell, ordered Goss to go to Dublin to assist in the ongoing preparations the upcoming sabotage campaign in England (S-Plan). The S-Plan was a campaign of bombing and sabotage against the civil, economic and military infrastructure of the United Kingdom from 1939 to 1940. During the campaign there were 300 explosions, 10 deaths and 96 injuries. Richie Goss was then sent to England where he helped to organise IRA Units, safe-houses etc. for the campaign. During the campaign Goss was the IRA's Operations Officer in Manchester. In May 1939 Goss was arrested in Liverpool (while waiting for a bus back to Manchester) for refusing to account for £20 in his possession and was sentenced to seven-days in Walton Gaol - when released he reported back to the IRA in London.

About two months later, he returned to Ireland but was unlucky enough to be arrested and interned by the Irish Defence Forces during their nationwide round-up of known and suspected IRA members and supporters. The Republican-minded lawyer, Seán MacBride (former Chief of Staff of the IRA) supported the Republican prisoners and on 1 December 1939, (due to McBride's 'habeas corpus' application) Richie Goss and fifty-two other Republican prisoners were released from Mountjoy Jail.

== Arrest and execution ==
The men reported back to their IRA Unit's and continued the fight - Richie Goss was promoted to the position of Divisional Officer Commanding of the North-Leinster/South Ulster IRA. On 18 July 1941, Richie Goss was staying in the house of a family named Casey in Longford when it was surrounded by Irish Government troops and Special Branch police of the Garda Síochána; a shoot-out ended in the capture of the then twenty-six years old Richie Goss. In the cross fire two soldiers were wounded, resulting in a charge of shooting at members of the Garda and members of the Defence Forces with intent to evade arrest. Although Goss was not charged with the wounding of the soldiers and no one was killed, in July 1941 a Military Court (under the Emergency Powers Act 1939) returned a guilty verdict on Richie Goss and sentenced the IRA man to death (at that time there was no right to appeal for rulings of a Military Court). Speaking in court after his sentencing Goss stated (in part):

The liberation of the Six Counties from Britain and the securing of Irish Freedom was my sole motive. I regret that circumstances should have brought about the clash for which you have tried me, I hope that the future will witness the bringing about and the realization of the ideals of Irish Freedom. That is all I have to say."

He was executed by firing squad in Portlaoise Prison on 9 August 1941 and buried in the prison yard. On 18 September 1948 the bodies of six executed Irish Republicans associated with the S-Plan (Richard Goss, Patrick McGrath, Thomas Harte, George Plant, Maurice O'Neill and Charlie Kerins) were disinterred in prison yards and given to their relatives for re-burial. Maurice O'Neill and Richard Goss were the only people executed by the state for a non-murder crime. Within the 20th century, a total of 163 people were executed by the Irish State with 31 executions occurring between the years 1924-1954. Richard Goss was reinterned in Dowdallshill Cemetery, Dundalk, County Louth.
