= The Emergency (Ireland) =

State of emergency in the Republic of Ireland during World War II

Early years of World War II in Europe (1939-1941). Note the position of Ireland with respect to the United Kingdom and Nazi Germany.

The Emergency (Irish: Ré na Práinne / An Éigeandáil) was a state of emergency in the Republic of Ireland during World War II, throughout which the state remained neutral. It was proclaimed by Dáil Éireann on 2 September 1939, allowing the passage of the Emergency Powers Act 1939 by the Oireachtas the following day. This gave sweeping powers to the government, including internment, censorship of the press and correspondence, and control of the economy. The Emergency Powers Act lapsed on 2 September 1946, although the Emergency was not formally ended until 1976.

== Background of the Emergency ==
On 6 December 1922, following the Anglo-Irish Treaty that ended the War of Independence, the island of Ireland became an autonomous dominion, known as the Irish Free State. On 7 December 1922, the parliament of the six north-eastern counties, already known as Northern Ireland, voted to opt out of the Irish Free State and remain in the United Kingdom. This Treaty settlement was immediately followed by the Irish Civil War between the pro-Treaty and anti-Treaty factions of the Irish Republican Army (IRA).

After 1932, the governing party of the new state was the republican Fianna Fáil, led by Éamon de Valera (a veteran of both Irish wars and the Easter Rising). In 1937, de Valera introduced a new constitution, which distanced the state further from the United Kingdom, and which changed its name to "Ireland". He had also conducted the Anglo-Irish trade war between 1932 and 1938.

De Valera had good relations with the British Prime Minister, Neville Chamberlain. He resolved the two countries' economic differences, and negotiated the return of the Treaty Ports – Berehaven, Cobh, and Lough Swilly – which had remained under British jurisdiction under the Anglo-Irish Treaty of 1921. The major remaining disagreement between the countries was the status of Northern Ireland. The Irish saw it as rightfully Irish territory, while the UK saw it as rightfully British territory. Within Ireland itself, armed opposition to the treaty settlement took the name of the anti-treaty IRA, seeing itself as the "true" government of Ireland. This IRA mounted a sabotage/bombing campaign, the S-Plan, exclusively in England from January 1939 to March 1940. These attacks consisted of approximately 300 explosions and acts of sabotage, resulting in 10 deaths and 96 injuries.

== Declaration of the Emergency ==
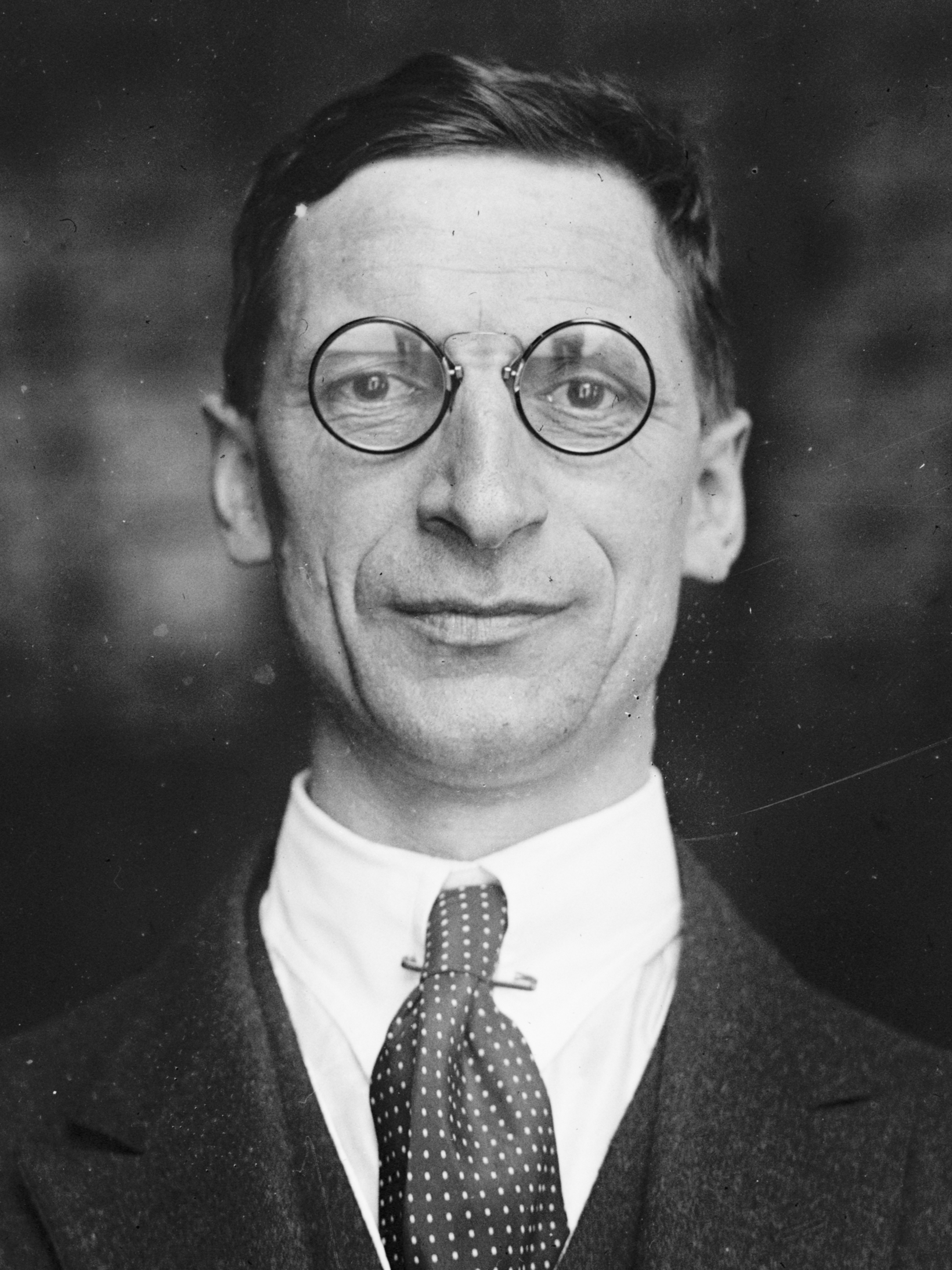
Éamon de Valera, leader of Ireland between 1932 and 1948

On 1 September 1939, German troops invaded Poland from the west, followed by a Soviet Union invasion on 17 September from the east. The invasion precipitated war between Germany and the UK, France, and their allies. On 2 September, de Valera told the Dáil Éireann (the lower house of parliament) that neutrality was the best policy for the country. In this he was almost universally supported by the Dáil and the country at large (although many joined the British military). (Note: There was only one vote against neutrality in the Dáil, from James Dillon, who argued that the State should side with the Allies. He eventually resigned his Dáil seat and from Fine Gael, the main opposition party, because of their support for neutrality. (He rejoined Fine Gael in 1953 and served as their leader from 1959 to 1965.)) The 1937 constitution was amended to allow the government to take emergency powers, and then the Emergency Powers Act 1939 was passed that included censorship of the press and mail correspondence. The government was able to take control of the economic life of the country under the new Minister of Supply Seán Lemass. Liberal use was made of all of these powers. Internment of those who had committed a crime or were about to commit one would be used extensively against the IRA.

Censorship was under the charge of the Minister for the Co-ordination of Defensive Measures, Frank Aiken. It was purportedly necessary to prevent publication of matters that might undermine the neutrality of the state and to prevent it becoming a clearing house for foreign intelligence, though over the period of the Emergency, the Act started to be used for more party political purposes such as preventing the publication of the numbers of Irish soldiers serving in the United Kingdom armed forces or industrial disputes within the state. The information made available to Irish people was also controlled. De Valera performed the duties of Minister of External Affairs, though the secretary for the Department of External Affairs, Joseph Walshe, was very influential.

Most emergency measures were made by secondary legislation in the form of statutory orders under the Emergency Powers Act; the only other emergency primary legislation was the General Elections (Emergency Provisions) Act 1943, which allowed the 1943 and 1944 general elections to be held without a preceding dissolution of the Dáil. This was to allow the old Dáil to continue in the event that the election could not be completed.

== Neutrality policy ==
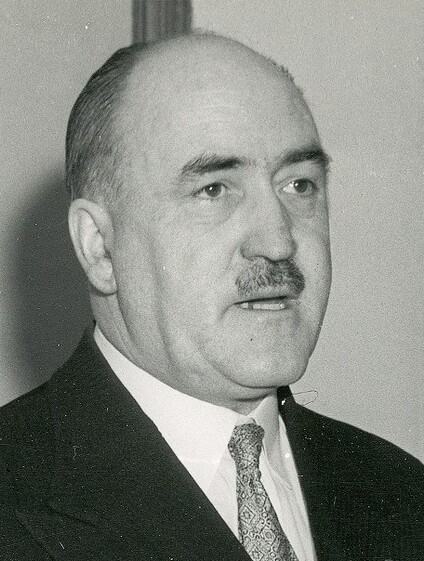
Frank Aiken, Minister for the Co-ordination of Defensive Measures, 1939–1945

On the declaration of the emergency, Walshe asked for assurances from the German minister in Dublin, Eduard Hempel, that Germany would not use its legation for espionage nor attack Irish trade with Great Britain. He then travelled to London on 6 September where he met the Dominions Secretary, Anthony Eden, who was conciliatory and defended Irish neutrality in subsequent Cabinet meetings. In addition, the appointment of Sir John Maffey as a British representative in Dublin was agreed.

For the Irish government, neutrality meant not displaying alignment with either side. On one hand, that meant the open announcement of military activity such as the sighting of submarines or the arrival of parachutists and the suppression of any foreign intelligence activity. Ireland's geographic position meant that this policy tended to benefit the Allies more than Germany. For example, British airmen who crash-landed in the State were allowed to go free if they could claim not to have been on a combat mission; otherwise they were released "on licence" (promise to remain). Many chose to escape to Great Britain via Northern Ireland. (Note: All Allied servicemen were released from internment by October 1944 while all Axis servicemen remained at the Curragh. Until 1942, it was not even a technical offence to aid the escape of an internee. Surface ships were excluded from the deal. An example of this policy is the release into Northern Ireland of six officers, including four generals, who had crash-landed in Galway en route from Africa on 15 January 1943. Hempel reported in November 1943 that only eleven out of the forty allied internees remained interned.) Also, Allied mechanics were allowed to retrieve crash-landed Allied aircraft. There was extensive co-operation between British and Irish intelligence and the exchange of information such as detailed weather reports of the Atlantic Ocean; the decision to go ahead with the D-day landings was influenced by a weather report from Blacksod Bay, County Mayo.

On the other hand, in the first few years of the war, the government did not show any overt preference for either side. This is partly because de Valera had to keep national unity, which meant accommodating the large swathe of Irish society that rejected anything to do with the British, some of whom admired Germany (which had failed in an attempt to supply a small cache of arms to the rebels of 1916) to some extent. These attitudes were shared by Aiken and by Walshe. Many, including de Valera and Richard Mulcahy, estimated Irish popular sympathies as favouring Germany due to anti-British hostility, and de Valera feared that joining the Allies would drive public opinion completely towards the Germans. The Fianna Fáil government, headed by de Valera, ruled alone and did not accommodate any other party in decision making.

== The Defence Forces and the Emergency ==
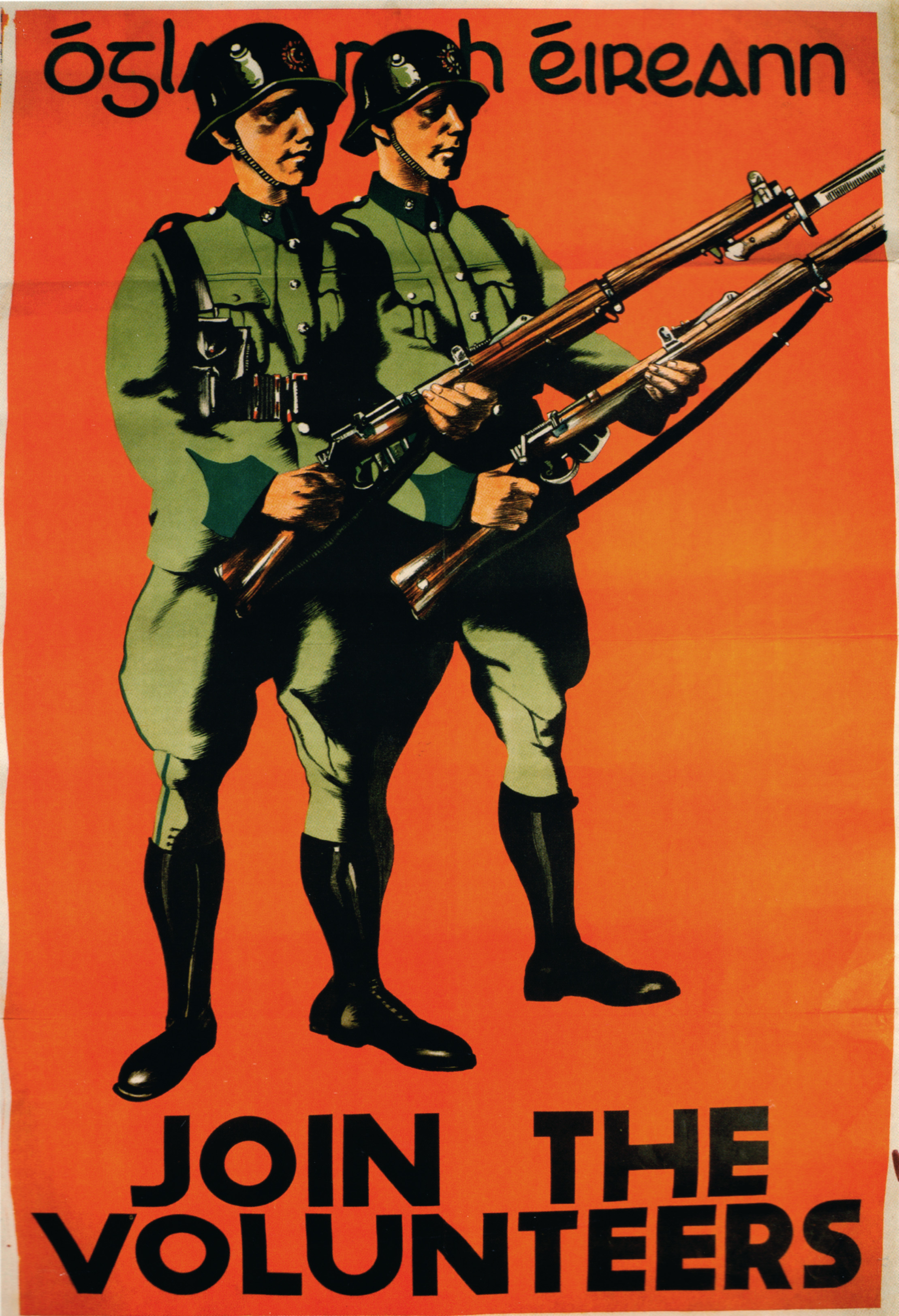
Recruitment Poster for the Volunteer Reserve Forces, 1939.

At the start of the Second World War, the Defence forces were less than 20,000 men but increased to almost 41,000 by mid 1941. In addition by June 1943 the Local Defence Force increased to 106,000. A second line reserve force 26th Infantry Battalion was formed from former members of the IRA who had fought in 1916 and the War of Independence.

== The IRA and the Emergency ==
In the early months of the emergency, the greatest threat to the State came from the IRA. In the Christmas Raid in 1939, one million rounds of ammunition were stolen from the Irish Army by the IRA (though it was mostly recovered in the following weeks) and there were a number of killings, mostly of policemen. (Note: There were a number of IRA attacks between 1935 and 1945, including ten murders, mostly between January 1939 and March 1940 (see S-Plan). Notably, these included the murder of Detective Officer John Roche by Tomás Mac Curtain in Dublin in January 1940 and of two policemen in August.) In addition, the existing emergency legislation was undermined by the obtaining of a writ of habeas corpus by Seán MacBride which resulted in the release of all those who had been interned. The government responded with the 1939 and 1940 Offences Against the State Acts, which established the Special Criminal Court, and rearrested and interned IRA activists.

During this time two IRA men died as the result of hunger strikes – demanding free association and to have two prisoners (IRA Volunteers Nicky Doherty of County Meath and John Dwyer) moved from the criminal wing to the Republican area within the prison (Mountjoy Jail). On 17 February 1940 Tony D'Arcy was arrested and sentenced to three months for refusing to account for his movements and for not giving his name and address. IRA volunteer D'Arcy died as a result of a 52 day hunger strike (16 April 1940) at the age of 32. D'Arcy left a wife and three young children. On 29 December 1939 Jack McNeela and several others were arrested in south Dublin at a location where an illegal radio transmitter was operating. McNeela and three other IRA men were imprisoned in Mountjoy Jail, tried (and found guilty) by a military tribunal for "conspiracy to usurp a function of Government" by operating a pro-Irish Republican pirate radio station, with McNeela being sentenced to two years imprisonment. With no concessions from the Irish Free State government, McNeela died on 19 April 1940 after 55 days on hunger strike in the Military Wing of St Bricin's Military Hospital, Dublin.

Two IRA men (Patrick McGrath and Thomas Harte) were executed for the murder of two policemen in September 1940. The IRA became increasingly ineffective in the face of the resolute use of internment, the breaking of hunger strikes, and the application of hanging for capital offences. A total of seven IRA men were executed in Ireland between September 1940 and December 1944: Patrick McGrath, Thomas Harte, Richard Goss, George Plant, and Maurice O'Neill were executed by firing squad, while two others were hanged – Tom Williams in Crumlin Road Gaol, Belfast and Charlie Kerins in Mountjoy Jail, Dublin. Maurice O'Neill and Richard Goss were the only people executed by the Irish state for a non-murder crime.

During 1941, the IRA's hopes of a German invasion had faded and funding from the United States had been cut off. The IRA leadership were mostly interned within the Curragh Camp, where they were treated increasingly harshly, or on the run. Most internees accepted release on parole. The IRA remained barely active in Northern Ireland, but they were not a threat to the stability of Ireland. The IRA fostered links with German intelligence (the Abwehr) and the German Foreign Ministry, with men such as Francis Stuart travelling to Germany to talk, though these attempts were largely ineffectual due to a combination of Abwehr and Foreign Ministry incompetence and IRA weakness. Germans also came to Ireland, including Hermann Görtz, who was captured in possession of "Plan Kathleen", an IRA plan that detailed a German-supported invasion of Northern Ireland.

== Ireland and the United Kingdom 1939–1941 ==
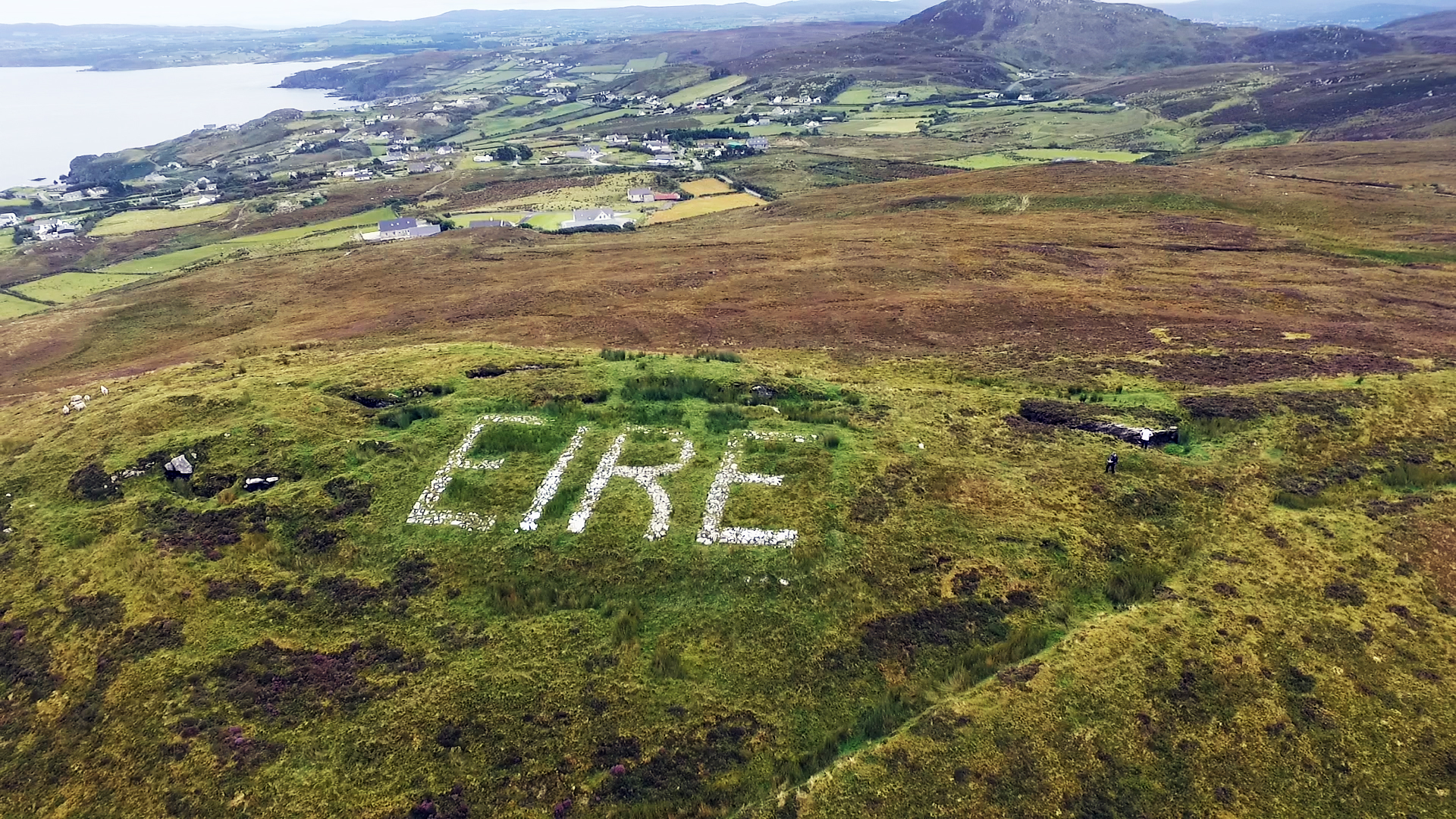
Markings to alert aircraft to neutral Ireland ("Éire" English: "Ireland") during WWII on Glengad Head, County Donegal (pictured 2015)

There was a reluctance on the part of the British to accept the policy of Irish neutrality. Anthony Eden, Dominions Secretary in the new British war cabinet, said "we do not want formally to recognise Eire as neutral while Eire remains a member of the British Commonwealth" as this he said would be in conflict with the "constitutional theory of the indivisibility of the crown". A prevalent view in the UK was that Ireland was obliged to support the UK in the war. Winston Churchill said at the time that "Southern Ireland is at war, but skulking".

After the German invasion of Norway in April 1940, Churchill became the British Prime Minister. The fall of France in June 1940 brought the war close to Ireland, as German troops occupied the French coastline across the Celtic Sea.

The United Kingdom was now the only major impediment to Germany. A major British concern was now whether Germany would invade Ireland. The British view was that the Irish Army was not powerful enough to resist an invasion for long enough for reinforcement from the UK, particularly with the IRA as a potential fifth column, and wished to be able to forestall this by stationing troops and ships within the Irish state. In addition, this view made the UK reluctant to provide military supplies because of the risk of their falling into German hands after an invasion. The Irish government's view was that they would be more successful against the Germans than the states already occupied, and there could be no agreement for joint military measures while partition continued, and would not commit themselves beyond neutrality for the whole island should it end.

=== Unification refused ===
By June 1940, the British representative in Ireland, Maffey, was urging that "the strategic unity of our island group" should take precedence over Ulster Unionism, and Churchill was making clear that there should be no military action taken against Ireland. The British Minister for Health, Malcolm MacDonald, who had negotiated the 1938 trade agreement with Ireland whilst Secretary of State for Dominion Affairs, was sent to Dublin to explore possibilities with de Valera. From these Chamberlain produced a six-point proposal that committed the UK government to a united Ireland and proposed the setting up of a joint body to effect this. A Joint Defence Council would be set up immediately and the State provided with military equipment. In return the State would join the Allies and intern all German and Italian aliens. Rejected by the Irish government, the proposal was then amended to strengthen the steps towards a united Ireland, and no longer requiring Ireland to join the war, but only to invite British forces to use Irish bases and ports. De Valera rejected the revised proposal on 4 July and made no counter proposal.

One reason for this would have been the difficult calculation of how damaging the inevitable split in Ireland would be if such a proposal was accepted. One of the main reasons was that the Irish Government thought that the UK would lose the war and did not want to be on the losing side: during the negotiations Walshe had produced two memoranda for de Valera (one entitled Britain's Inevitable Defeat) predicting the isolation of Great Britain, the dismemberment of its empire, and finally its inevitable crushing by Germany. Walshe also wrote approvingly of the character of the Pétain government. Walshe's memoranda affected de Valera, with him telling MacDonald that Great Britain "could not destroy this colossal [German] machine". Nevertheless, from May 1940, Walshe and Col Liam Archer of Irish Military Intelligence discussed the defence of Ireland in the event of a German invasion with counterparts in Northern Ireland and a general strategic plan for UK military action "Plan W" across the border "if invited" was developed.

=== Ports and shipping ===
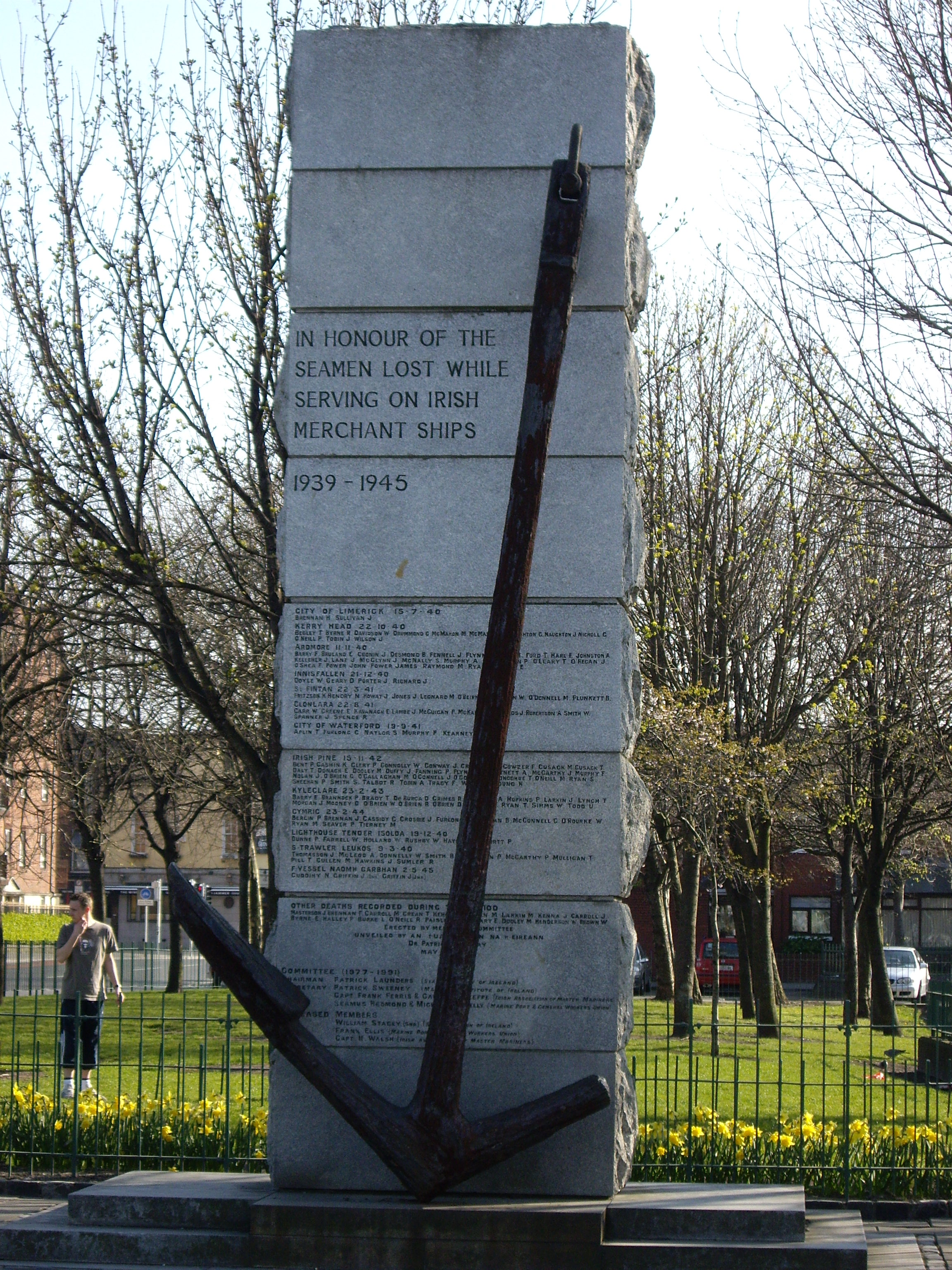
A memorial erected in Dublin in 1991 to members of the Irish mercantile marine lost during the Emergency

The great majority of Ireland's trade was with the United Kingdom, and most of its supplies came from there. This created great difficulties for the Irish government as Germany tried to blockade the UK. Additionally the UK required Irish ships to operate under their "navicert" system. In September 1940, a joint agreement on trade, shipping and exports fell through—"the main sticking point between the two sides was the prices on offer from Britain" owing to the refusal to allow transshipment and repair facilities following German pressure, including the threat to blockade Ireland and the bombing of Ambrosetown and Campile in County Wexford. In the autumn of 1940, the threat of German invasion had receded, but relations between the UK and Ireland deteriorated, largely as a result of the increased losses of Allied shipping to U-boat attack. To try to prevent some of these losses, the UK wanted sea and air bases in western Ireland. On 5 November, in the House of Commons, Churchill complained:

The fact that we cannot use the South and West coasts of Ireland to refuel our flotillas and aircraft and thus protect the trade by which Ireland as well as Great Britain lives, is a most heavy and grievous burden and one which should never have been placed on our shoulders, broad though they may be.

The Irish government chose to interpret this sentence as a threat of invasion. Some sort of armed occupation was a real possibility (the UK had occupied Iceland in May 1940), but the balance of evidence is that there was never a serious threat. Large elements of the British cabinet and government and those of its allies were opposed to any armed intervention in Ireland; however, in late 1940 and early 1941, relations between the two countries did worsen. The British stopped informing Ireland of their order of battle in Northern Ireland, while the Irish Army drew up plans for defence against the British. The United Kingdom also started to restrict trade to Ireland, reasoning that if Ireland would not do anything to protect the lives of those bringing in supplies, it should at least share in the deprivations being felt in the UK. Relations between the two countries only really eased in the middle of 1941 with the invasion of the Soviet Union by Germany and an agreement to allow Irish immigration to Britain to work in the war industries, resulting in up to 200,000 Irish people doing so by 1945.

=== The economy ===
The wartime Irish economy was largely dependent on Britain for coal, manufactured goods and fuel oils. Supplies of these were reduced after the fall of France in mid-1940, causing price inflation and a busy black market. It was said that "the poor are like hunted rats looking for bread", as wheat supplies fell, and that the introduction of full rationing was "seriously belated". Typhus reappeared and the government started planning for famine relief in late 1941. John Betjeman, the British press attaché in Dublin, reported "No coal. No petrol. No gas. No electric. No paraffin. Guinness good." In March 1942 the government banned the export of beers, and decided that more wheat should be grown, and less barley. The prospect of a shortage of beer led on to barter deals whereby Britain supplied wheat suitable for making bread flour, and coal, and in return Ireland allowed the export of beers. "These supplies were to keep neutral Ireland afloat during World War II and enable the continuance of Irish neutrality".

== Ireland and the neutral United States ==
At the beginning of World War II, Franklin D. Roosevelt was serving his second term as the President of the United States. The United States was neutral, and Roosevelt's actions were circumscribed by neutrality legislation; however, Roosevelt was a vehement anti-Nazi, an unequivocal supporter of the UK in the war, and personally close to Churchill. The US minister to Ireland was David Gray, a personal friend of Roosevelt and his wife Eleanor. De Valera saw the US as a bulwark against invasion from any party, while the US saw the support of Britain in the war as the priority, and so while supportive of Irish neutrality was sceptical of it extending over the whole island and wanted an arrangement to be made with the UK over ports, possibly through the leasing of them.

The sale of arms was a major issue. The declaration of war legally impeded the US from selling any arms to belligerents under the laws in force at the time; this led to Ireland being briefly considered as a possible conduit for arms sales to circumvent the law. However, in November 1939 Congress agreed to change the law to allow the sale of arms to all belligerents on a "cash and carry" basis. Nevertheless, the Irish government wanted the US to sell them arms. This was supported by Gray, and by the British government, but only if not at the expense of their own allocation. As a result, in 1940 all surplus US arms were sold to the UK and Canada.

The strong support of the UK by the Roosevelt administration led the Irish government to try to bolster anti-Roosevelt isolationist opinion in the November 1940 presidential election and a Christmas radio broadcast by de Valera to the US supporting isolationism. An attempt to influence Roosevelt's special emissary, Wendell Willkie, on a visit to Great Britain and Ireland in January 1941, failed. In a further attempt to obtain arms from the US de Valera decided that Aiken should visit Washington. Gray supported the idea of a visit, but had doubts over whether Aiken was the right person to make it, and stressed that the Irish were only likely to obtain arms if they co-operated with the British Purchasing Commission. Aiken left Ireland in March 1941. For his St Patrick's Day address, de Valera claimed that Ireland was under blockade from both sides and that neutrality protected Ireland from "the hazards of imperial adventure". Aiken's visit was disastrous. His anti-British views and, in American eyes, overestimation of Ireland's military capabilities went across all the administration's policies towards the war. As well as alienating Roosevelt and other members of the administration, he failed to use the letters of introduction to senior Democrats, including Eleanor Roosevelt, provided to him by Gray. Aiken spent the last seven weeks of his visit on what was seen as an anti-administration speaking tour, associating closely with isolationist opinion. The result was that the US would not sell any armaments to the State, and relations between the two countries significantly worsened, the US becoming even more unequivocal in its support of the UK. In October 1941 on receiving a note from the Irish government asking for its intentions with regard to Northern Ireland on the stationing of personnel associated with lend-lease, the US State Department referred them to the British government as Northern Ireland was, they insisted, part of the UK.

== Significant events ==
=== Belfast Blitz ===
Meanwhile, Northern Ireland (as part of the United Kingdom) was at war and the Harland and Wolff shipyards in Belfast were among the strategic targets for German attack. The Luftwaffe carried out a bombing raid on Belfast on 7 April 1941; eight people died. On 15 April 1941, 180 Luftwaffe bombers attacked Belfast. There was only one RAF squadron and seven anti-aircraft batteries to defend Belfast. Over 200 tons of explosives, 80 landmines attached to parachutes and 800 firebomb canisters were dropped. Over 1,000 died and 56,000 houses (more than half of the city's housing stock) were damaged, leaving 100,000 temporarily homeless. At 4.30 AM Basil Brooke, Northern Ireland's Minister of Commerce, asked de Valera for assistance. Within two hours, 13 fire tenders from Dublin, Drogheda, Dundalk and Dún Laoghaire were on their way to cross the Irish border to assist their Belfast colleagues. De Valera followed up with his "they are our people" speech. Although there was a later raid on 4 May, it was confined to the docks and shipyards.

=== Dublin bombing ===
On 2 January 1941, there were several minor German bombings of Irish territory, which led to three deaths in Borris, County Carlow and other incidents in Wexford, Dublin and at the Curragh. The public mood was already agitated, fearing a German invasion and the implications of the bombings added to the concern. So as not to antagonise the Germans further, the Irish authorities initially declined to confirm that the bombs were German. Public speculation, and IRA claims, that the bombs were British, or German but released by British aircraft, later prompted Irish Government denials.

On the night of 30/31 May 1941, Dublin's Northside was the target of a Luftwaffe air raid. Thirty-eight were killed and seventy houses were destroyed on Summerhill Parade, North Strand and the North Circular Road. Unlike the earlier bombing incidents, there was no public speculation that the perpetrators were anyone other than the Luftwaffe. The Irish government promptly protested and Germany apologised, claiming that high winds or British interference with navigation signals were to blame. Churchill later conceded that the raids might have been the result of a British invention which distorted Luftwaffe radio guidance beams so as to throw their planes off course. Dublin had limited blackout regulations at the time, so the city was clearly visible, unlike British cities.

On 3 October, the German news agency announced that the German government would pay compensation, but only West Germany paid this after the war, using Marshall Aid money.

=== The Allies and neutrality ===
- In June 1940, to encourage the neutral Irish state to join with the Allies, Churchill indicated to de Valera that the United Kingdom would push for Irish unity, but believing that Churchill could not deliver, de Valera declined the offer. The British did not inform the Government of Northern Ireland that they had made the offer to the Irish government, and de Valera's rejection was not publicised until 1970.
- When, in 1941, the Irish police discovered "Operation Green" in a residence where German agent Hermann Görtz had been staying, the Irish promptly passed copies to MI5 in London, who in turn forwarded them to the Royal Ulster Constabulary (RUC) in Belfast. Joint plans of action were then drawn up between the British and Irish intelligence services and military under Plan W.
- General McKenna, the Irish Army's Chief of Staff, regularly visited British officers in Belfast and in 1942 twelve Irish officers undertook training with British special forces in Poyntzpass, County Armagh. Cooperation did not end there and also included the British signalling through GPO lines when it believed German planes were headed towards Ireland.
- From December 1940 onwards the Irish Government agreed to accept over 2,000 British women and children evacuated from London due to "The Blitz". These evacuees included over two hundred children orphaned by the bombing. (Note: The British paid for the food and clothing allowance of the orphans, but the Irish paid for their lodgings, attempts were also made to have the British pay for their hospital treatment, but it was dropped when the request was "unfavourably received" in London.)
- Attacks on Irish vessels, such as that on the Kerlogue, which the British had initially attributed to the Germans, but later admitted responsibility for and offered to pay compensation when fragments of British ammunition were discovered embedded in the ship. The ship had been attacked by aircraft of the No. 307 Polish Night Fighter Squadron, after being mistaken for a French vessel.
- The mining of the St George's Channel to within 7 miles (11 km) of the Irish coast at Dungarvan, and the use of Irish waters for British shipping traffic.
- London was informed when U-boats were sighted.
- The Donegal Corridor allowed British flying boats based on Lough Erne to take a short-cut over Irish territory when flying patrols over the Atlantic. The Catalina which located the German battleship Bismarck when it was heading for France in 1941 was one example.
- Throughout the war, the Irish Air Corps shot down dozens of escaped British barrage balloons.
- A British armed trawler, the Robert Hastie, was stationed at Killybegs, from June 1941, for air/sea rescue (ASR) duties.
- The decision to go ahead with the D-day landings being decided on, in part, by a weather report from Blacksod Bay, County Mayo.
- Several Allied aircrew who crashed or landed in Ireland were interned though many were returned to Britain or Northern Ireland, especially after 1942. The final release was made in June 1944.
- De Valera protested vociferously to the American Government about its "invasion of Ireland" when U.S. troops had landed in Northern Ireland.
- On the death of Roosevelt, de Valera made arrangements for a commemoration service in St Mary's (Catholic) Pro-Cathedral. The Ambassador, David Gray, said that he would not attend unless it was held in St. Patrick's (Church of Ireland) Cathedral, Dublin. Walsh tried to contact the Ambassador, but was told that Gray was unavailable. Neither service was held. Since the Ambassador would be unavailable to receive condolences, de Valera sent his secretary to deliver his condolences rather than trying to deliver them in person. De Valera then instructed that flags be lowered to half-mast as a mark of respect to the late President.

=== The Axis and neutrality ===
- German pilots, aircrew and naval personnel who were discovered in Ireland were always interned and remained so for the duration of the conflict. (Note: According to the Irish Defence Department, there were "no International Conventions specifically governing the treatment of belligerent internees and accordingly it appears open to neutral States... to prescribe conditions of internment in whatever manner they think fit." That is why the Irish felt that they could release British pilots but retain German ones. De Valera argued that blow-by-blow parity, returning German aircrews to Germany could not take place as they could bring back militarily-valuable information. However, Hempel was to find out in 1943 that the Irish had been negotiating with the British over returning German internees.) One German prisoner was shot while attempting to escape from Oldcastle prison camp.
- In July 1940, three German Abwehr agents were arrested outside Skibbereen after landing near Castletownshend, County Cork. The agents' mission had been to infiltrate Britain via Ireland.
- Ralph Ingersoll, who visited Britain in late 1940, wrote that year that "Many informed people in Great Britain suspect that the [German] submarines are using bases in Ireland. There are many stories of submarine crews being seen in the cafés in Dublin out of uniform."
- The chief Abwehr spy in Ireland was Hermann Görtz. Approximately 12 spies were deployed, mostly with little success, including Günther Schütz, Ernst Weber-Drohl (a former circus strongman) and Henry Obed, an Indian.
- The activities of German agents in Ireland throughout the war years and their attempts to contact and court both IRA and disaffected Irish Army personnel. Many of these agents, if not all, were captured/exposed.
- The German ambassador at the German Legation in Dublin, Eduard Hempel, had his radio confiscated in 1943 to prevent him from passing information to his leaders. This is thought to have occurred at the insistence of the American forces stationed in Northern Ireland. Hempel had been relaying Irish Army strength and troop movements to Berlin throughout the war, and he is also thought to have relayed weather reports to the German battleships Scharnhorst and Gneisenau in February 1942. The British military had been intercepting and logging his transmissions.
- The U-boat torpedo attack which sank the vessel SS Irish Oak on 19 May 1943. De Valera said that "it was a wanton and inexcusable act. There was no possibility of a mistake, the conditions of visibility were good and the neutral markings on our ships were clear. There was no warning given." (Note: In most cases, each Irish ship had "Éire" painted in large lettering on the side and decking, and flew the Flag of Ireland. Irish ships sunk by U-boat included the Munster, the Kerry Head, the City of Limerick, and the SS Kyleclare. The City of Bremen was sunk by German planes south-west of Mizen Head on 2 June 1942.)
- The "North Strand Bombing" on 31 May 1941 and others that took place in Malin, County Donegal on 5 May 1941, and Arklow on 1 June 1941.
- Repeated attempts to offer captured British weaponry to de Valera if he would side with the Germans.

== Relations with Germany ==
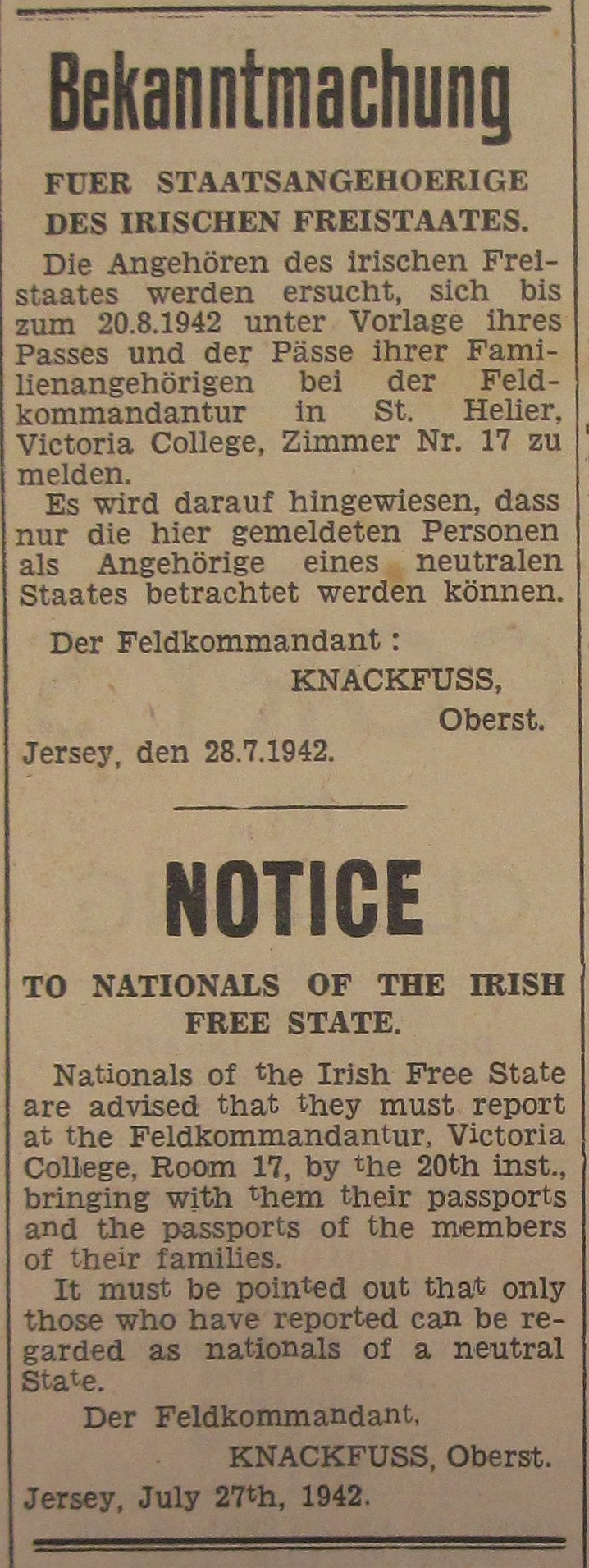
Notice from German-occupied Jersey inviting Irish citizens to register as "nationals of a neutral state."

In pursuit of its policy of neutrality, the Irish Government refused to close the German embassy. In 1939, the German Government had very little intelligence on Ireland and Britain. This is because Hitler had hoped for a détente or alliance with Britain, whom he considered the "natural allies" of Nazi Germany. When concerted efforts to build a reliable picture of British military strength did begin around 1939–1940, efforts were first made to infiltrate spies to Britain via Ireland, but these attempts consistently failed (see Operation Lobster and Operation Seagull). The Abwehr also made attempts to foster intelligence gathering links with the IRA, but found that the IRA was in no condition to be of serious use — these attempts were to occur during the period 1939–1943. The German military also drew up plans detailing how an invasion of Ireland might take place. These plans were titled Plan Green and any invasion was to act as a diversionary attack in support of a main attack to conquer Britain titled Operation Sea Lion. Both of these plans were shelved by 1942. When US Army troops began to be stationed in Northern Ireland in 1942, Plan Green was reprinted because there was a fear amongst the German High Command (and the Irish Government) that the US Army might attempt an invasion of Ireland, following its occupation of Iceland (after the British invasion) and Greenland in 1941. These fears led to another German intelligence plan – Operation Osprey – but it was abandoned when the feared American invasion failed to take place.

The British also had a plan to occupy the entire island as a response to any attempted German invasion. They had always sought to privately reassure de Valera that any invasion by their troops would be by invitation only. This scheme was titled Plan W and intricate details were worked out with the Irish government and military over how to react to a German invasion. The Irish military shared details of their defences and military capabilities with the British and troops stationed in Northern Ireland. The reassurances from the British did not altogether console de Valera however, and he was frequently suspicious, while German forces still threatened Britain, that the British might invade the territory of the State. He did not know that the Prime Minister of Northern Ireland, Craigavon, was urging London to seize the port at Cobh, or that attempts had been made to split the consensus over the Neutrality policy. Concessions such as relaxing of the claim on Lough Swilly to allow British navy and air force patrols did go some way to easing the tension. As the war turned against Nazi Germany in their eastern campaign, and as the Abwehr became less and less effective, around 1943–1944, operations in the island of Ireland ceased to be of interest to the German Government and military and therefore the British. Overall, during the period the focus of de Valera was maintaining Irish neutrality. The Irish authorities' pursuit of an aggressive campaign of internment against the IRA, including raising the Local Security Force (LSF), executions, and aggressive action by Irish Military Intelligence (G2) meant that the activities of the German Legation in Dublin were supervised closely and attempts to infiltrate spies into the country were quickly discovered.

On the occasion of the death of Adolf Hitler, de Valera paid a controversial visit to Hempel to express sympathy with the German people over the death of the Führer. This action has been defended as proper given the state's neutrality. Sir John Maffey, the British Representative, commented that de Valera's actions were "unwise but mathematically consistent". Douglas Hyde, Ireland's president, also sent condolences, an action which enraged the United States minister as no similar action had taken place on the deaths of President Franklin D. Roosevelt or the former British Prime Minister David Lloyd George.

=== Attitudes to the Holocaust ===
Elements of Irish public opinion were markedly different in their treatment of the Axis powers. A Limerick Leader editorial in 1945 noted that, "The campaign against war criminals is strangely confined to those who happen to fight on the wrong side." However it continued to say that

Allied atrocities cannot excuse the monstrous barbarism of the Reich. (Note: In Kilkenny in 1945, a letter to a local newspaper declared that newsreel footage of Belsen was "all propaganda" and had been faked by the British using starving Indians. Also in Kilkenny the first prize in a fancy dress ball went to "the Beast of Belsen".)

According to some sources, it appears that there was official indifference from the political establishment to the Jewish victims of the Holocaust during and after the war. This was despite De Valera having knowledge of the crimes committed against Jewish victims of the Holocaust as early as 1943. Other sources report that De Valera was so aware in 1942 and the government sought to secure the release of Jews from then. After the war had ended, Jewish groups had difficulty in getting refugee status for Jewish children – whilst at the same time, a plan to bring over four hundred Catholic children from the Rhineland encountered no difficulties. The Department of Justice explained in 1948 that:

It has always been the policy of the Minister for Justice to restrict the admission of Jewish aliens, for the reason that any substantial increase in our Jewish population might give rise to an anti-Semitic problem.

However, De Valera over-ruled the Department of Justice and the 150 refugee Jewish children were brought to Ireland in 1948. Earlier, in 1946, 100 Jewish children from Poland were brought to Clonyn Castle in County Meath by a London Jewish charity.

=== Irish victims of the Holocaust ===
Six Irish Jews are known to have been murdered in the Holocaust: Ettie Steinberg (born in Carpathian Ruthenia, lived in Dublin 1925–37), her Belgian-born husband Wojtech Gluck and their son Leon Gluck, who were all murdered at Auschwitz in 1942; Isaac Shishi, killed at Viekšniai, Lithuania in 1941; and siblings Ephraim and Jeanne (Lena) Saks, murdered at Auschwitz in 1944. Shishi and the Sakses were all born in Dublin but moved to continental Europe before war broke out. Six Stolpersteine commemorate them in Donore Avenue.

== Relations with Japan ==
Around 650 Irish citizens serving with the British armed forces were taken prisoner by the Japanese, of whom nearly a quarter died in captivity. Irish missionaries were also interned.

The county Clare town of Ennistymon was put on alert against a Japanese invasion after radio reports of the attack on Pearl Harbor were misheard to be referring to the nearby town of Bellharbour.

== The Emergency after the end of World War II ==
Emergency Service Medal

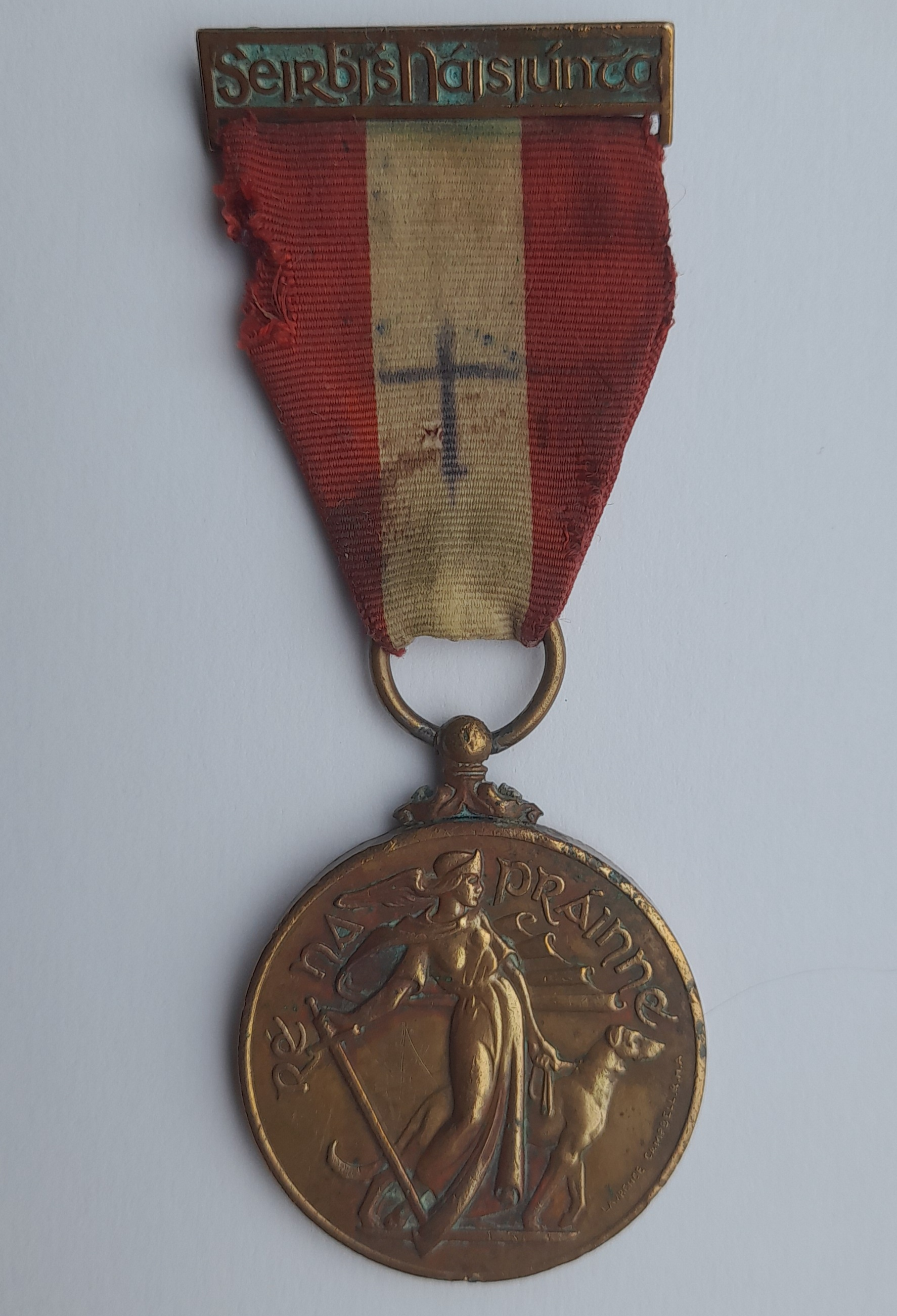
Obverse: Ré na Práinne "The Emergency Period"

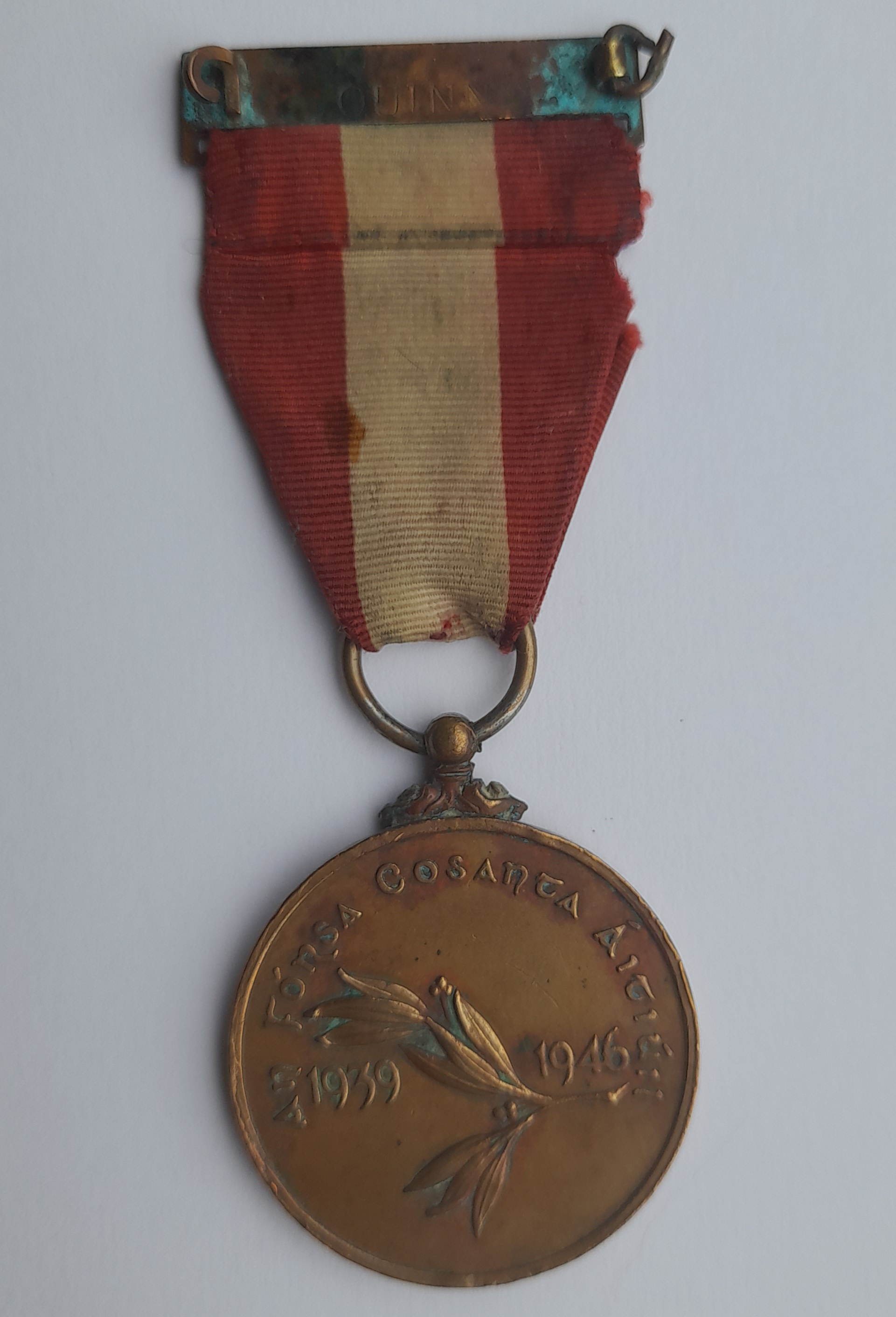
Reverse: Fórsa Cosanta Áitiúil 1939–1946

De Valera's reluctance to recognise a difference between World War II and previous European wars was illustrated by his reply to a radio broadcast by the British Prime Minister, Churchill on V-E Day. Churchill praised Britain's restraint in not occupying Ireland to secure the Western Approaches during the Battle of the Atlantic:

the approaches which the southern Irish ports and airfields could so easily have guarded were closed by the hostile aircraft and U-boats. This indeed was a deadly moment in our life, and if it had not been for the loyalty and friendship of Northern Ireland, we should have been forced to come to close quarters with Mr. de Valera, or perish from the earth. However, with a restraint and poise to which, I venture to say, history will find few parallels, His Majesty's Government never laid a violent hand upon them, though at times it would have been quite easy and quite natural, and we left the de Valera Government to frolic with the German and later with the Japanese representatives to their heart's content.

De Valera replied to Churchill in another radio broadcast, which was popular when broadcast in Ireland:

Allowances can be made for Mr. Churchill's statement, however unworthy, in the first flush of victory. No such excuse could be found for me in this quieter atmosphere. There are, however, some things it is essential to say. I shall try to say them as dispassionately as I can. Mr. Churchill makes it clear that, in certain circumstances, he would have violated our neutrality and that he would justify his actions by Britain's necessity. It seems strange to me that Mr. Churchill does not see that this, if accepted, would mean that Britain's necessity would become a moral code and that when this necessity became sufficiently great, other people's rights were not to count ... that is precisely why we had this disastrous succession of wars – World War No.1 and World War No.2 – and shall it be World War No.3? Surely Mr. Churchill must see that if his contention be admitted in our regard, a like justification can be framed for similar acts of aggression elsewhere and no small nation adjoining a great Power could ever hope to be permitted to go its own way in peace. It is indeed fortunate that Britain's necessity did not reach the point where Mr. Churchill would have acted. All credit to him that he successfully resisted the temptation which I have no doubt many times assailed him in his difficulties, and to which, I freely admit, many leaders might have easily succumbed. It is indeed hard for the strong to be just to the weak, but acting justly always has its rewards. By resisting his temptation in this instance, Mr. Churchill, instead of adding another horrid chapter to the already bloodstained record of the relations between England and this country, has advanced the cause of international morality – an important step, one of the most important indeed that can be taken on the road to the establishment of any sure basis for peace. ...

Mr. Churchill is proud of Britain's stand alone, after France had fallen and before America entered the war. Could he not find in his heart the generosity to acknowledge that there is a small nation that stood alone not for one year or two, but for several hundred years against aggression; that endured spoliations, famine, massacres, in endless succession; that was clubbed many times into insensibility, but each time on returning to consciousness took up the fight anew; a small nation that could never be got to accept defeat and has never surrendered her soul?

=== Punishment of Irish Army deserters ===
Unlike other neutral states, Ireland did not introduce a general prohibition on its citizens opting for foreign enlistment during the war. However, one serious concern of government in this regard was the relatively high number of Irish soldiers deserting and leaving the jurisdiction. Estimates of between 4,000 and 7,000 members of the Irish armed forces deserted to join the armed forces of belligerent nations, the majority serving in the British Army, Royal Air Force and Royal Navy.

On 17 May 1945, Minister for Defence Oscar Traynor stated that he proposed introducing legislation which would deprive deserters of any right "for a long time to come" to employment paid for from public funds. The legislation in question was the Emergency Powers (No. 362) order which was passed on 8 August 1945. This punished those who had deserted during the Emergency in four ways:

- Deserters forfeited all pay and allowances for the period of their absence.
- They lost any rights to pensions they might have earned due to their years of service.
- They lost any entitlement to unemployment benefits normally available to former members of the Irish Army.
- For a period of seven years they could not qualify for any employment remunerated from public funds.

The Order only applied to personnel who had been called to active duty during the Emergency or who had enlisted "for the duration" of the Emergency and affected 4,000 men.

The government's reasons for passing the order have been given as follows:

- To ensure that those personnel who had faithfully served the country in the defence forces had first chance of obtaining jobs with state and local authorities following demobilisation
- To deter future desertion
- To allow deserters to be dealt with in a cost-effective and expeditious way, rather than go the immense expense of court-martialling each man individually

On 18 October 1945 Thomas F. O'Higgins moved to annul the order. He did not condone desertion, but felt that the order was specifically awarding harsh punishment to those deserters who had served in the Allied forces. General Richard Mulcahy also spoke against the Order, disagreeing with the way in which it applied to enlisted men and not to officers. However, despite the arguments put forward by O'Higgins and Mulcahy, the Dáil voted in favour of the order.

An amnesty was enacted in the Defence Forces (Second World War Amnesty and Immunity) Act 2013, which admitted that the penalties were 'now considered to have been unduly harsh' and offered an apology to those affected. The Minister of Defence, Alan Shatter, commented that it 'was a tribute to how far we had come as a society that such a sensitive issue could get practically unanimous support from all sides in the Dáil'.

In April 1995 Taoiseach John Bruton paid tribute to those who "volunteered to fight against Nazi tyranny in Europe, at least 10,000 of whom were killed while serving in British uniforms. In recalling their bravery, we are recalling a shared experience of Irish and British people. We remember a British part of the inheritance of all who live in Ireland."

== End of the Emergency ==
The end of the Emergency was not declared until 1976, at the time of the Troubles. On 1 September 1976 a motion was passed in the Dáil "that the national emergency created by the armed conflict referred to in the Resolutions, pursuant to the said Article, of Dáil Éireann and Seanad Éireann of the 2nd September, 1939, has ceased to exist". The purpose of this was to allow the government to declare a new emergency, arising out of the conflict in Northern Ireland.

== See also ==
- Caught in a Free State – a television drama series on German wartime spies in Ireland, made by RTÉ
- Glen of Imaal disaster – an accidental explosion which occurred during the Emergency and remains the greatest loss of life in a single incident involving the Irish Defence Forces
- History of the Republic of Ireland
- Minister for Supplies
- Ulster Defence Volunteers
- Oskar Metzke
- Glimmer Man
