= Murphy v Ireland =

Irish Supreme Court case

Thomas Murphy v Ireland and Others
- Coat of arms of Ireland
- Court: Supreme Court of Ireland
- Full case name: Thomas Murphy v Ireland, The Attorney General and The Director of Public Prosecutions
- Decided: 11th March 2014
- Citation: [2014] 1 ILRM 457; [2014] IESC 19; [2014] 1 IR 198
- Transcript: https://www.bailii.org/ie/cases/IESC/2014/S19.html

Court membership
- Judges sitting: Denham C.J., Murray J., Hardiman J., Fennelly J., O'Donnell Donal J.

Case opinions
- Argued the DPP's failure to provide reasons for the issuing of a certificate under Section 42(6) of the Offences against the State Act 1939 were repugnant to the Constitution Of Ireland 1937 and section 42(6) was incompatible with the State's obligations under the ECHR. The court dismissed all the declarations of invalidity made by the plaintiff and the trial proceeded.
- Decision by: O'Donnell J.

Keywords
- Constitution | Criminal Law | Challenge to constitutionality of provision | Administration of Justice | Equality | ECHR Compatibility | ECHR

Thomas Murphy v Ireland and Others [2014] IESC 19; [2014] 1 ILRM 457; [2014] 1 IR 198; was an Irish Supreme Court case where the Court held that the Director of Public Prosecutions (DPP) is not required to provide information justifying a decision to hold a trial in the Special Criminal Court, unless it can be shown the decision was made mala fides. This decision further specified that the European Convention of Human Rights (ECHR) neither specified the nature of a fair trial nor identified trial-by-jury as a right.

However, by identifying some circumstances in which the DPP would be required to justify its decision to hold a trial in the Special Criminal Court and in stating that Murphy's failure to challenge the DPP's decision in a timely manner vitiated his claim, the decision ultimately weakened the "special protection" traditionally enjoyed by the DPP regarding judicial review.

== Background ==
The plaintiff, Thomas Murphy, was charged in November 2007 with failure to fill out a tax return, which violated the Taxes Consolidation Act 1997. The DPP issued a certificate that stated, under Section 42(6) of the Offences Against the State Act 1939, ordinary courts were inadequate to deal with the issue, secure the effective administration of justice and preservation of public peace. It also stated that the case should be forwarded to trial at the Special Criminal Court. As a result, on January 10, 2008, the District Court Judge made an order returning a date for trial to a sitting of the Special Criminal Court. The plaintiff brought judicial review proceeding challenging this return to trial, on the basis that the certain technical defects contained within them had been modified in proceedings in which Mr Murphy had not been represented. The High Court subsequently made an order to quash the return to trial but the effect of this quashing was "formal and procedural: it was accepted that a proper return for trial could be made and the trial proceed."

Instead of seeking a challenge of judicial review of the certificate, the plaintiff issued a plenary summons on 5 November 2008, seeking declarations that, by the court refusing to provide adequate reason for the issuing of the certificate, the court was in breach of his rights under the ECHR and the Constitution. The plaintiff also argued Section 42(6) of the 1939 Act failed to uphold his right to equality under Article 40.1 of the Constitution and therefore, the section was repugnant to the Constitution and was incompatible with the state's obligations under the European Convention of Human Rights.

== Judgement of the Supreme Court ==
O'Donnell J delivered the judgement to a unanimous court. The court agreed that the plaintiff had been treated unfairly, however they rejected the plaintiff's argument that the courts were in violation of Article 40.1 on the basis that his co-accuseds had been tried in the ordinary courts:

"When there isn't a prima facie case of mala fides, the Director of Public Prosecutions can't be ask to explain his decision and the reasons for it, or what information he has based that decision on. (State (McCormack) v. Curran [1987] ILRM at page 237)"

The court considered the compatibility of Section 42(6) of the 1939 Act with the ECHR, concluding that there was no incompatibility between the two stating that although the ECHR provides the right to a fair trial it does not detail how that trial should be provided: "Article 6 of the Convention guarantees a fair trial but the way the trail will be provided is not specified. This article does not guarantee in any instances, a right to a trial by jury."

The court also rejected the plaintiff's argument that the decision of the DPP was effectively "unreviewable". The court stated that on review of case law over the last 15 years, the DPP's decision were overwhelmingly effectively reviewable both 'in theory and in fact': "The court dismissed any idea the decision of the Director was unreviewable, instead it agrees that the Director would have been prepared to review the case and adjust the decision accordingly. The idea a jurisdiction is for good reason shouldnt be dismissed, although it is narrow it still is a reason."

In relation to the Plaintiff's claim that he should be provided with adequate reason for the issuing of the declaration, the court states that when the DPP makes a sole decision whether a case, which would ordinarily be tried before a jury, should be tried in the Special Criminal Court, fair procedures requires the DPP to provide reason to why ordinary courts are not sufficient to secure the administration of justice, however in this case since the offense was triable either way the District Court Judge could direct a trial without a requirement to provide reasons or a hearing:

When a decision is made in the District Court to direct trial on an offence that is triable either way, is subject to review by the Judge. If the District court judge refuses jurisdiction, this decision does not need any hearing or reasons. Similarly in Mallak, there is no question of the constitutional validity of the section.

=== Conclusion ===
The court concluded that there was no implications for the constitutional validity for section 42(6), as it did not set out any procedure or preclude the giving of reasons. The court dismissed all the declarations of invalidity made by the plaintiff and the trial proceeded.

== Subsequent developments ==
Attorney General v Marques [2015] IEHC 798, [2015] 12 JIC 1603 and Attorney General v Damache [2015] IEHC 339 both relied on Murphy to argue for judicial review of a DPP decision. Shaw v Minister for Justice and Equality [2018] IEHC 288 and Michael McKevitt v Minister for Justice [2015] IEHC 152, [2015] 1 IR 53 also base arguments on Murphy.
