= Waterford Jail disaster =

1943 wall collapse in Waterford, Ireland

The Waterford Jail Disaster occurred early morning on 4 March 1943 when the wall of the old city jail at Ballybricken in Waterford, Ireland, collapsed onto nearby houses, killing nine people and injuring seventeen.

== History ==
The old Waterford jail had been built in 1727 alongside the military barracks in the city. The building was rebuilt in 1861 and continued to be used as a prison until 1939 at the beginning of the Emergency as World War II was officially known in neutral Ireland. The following year the building was taken over by the Irish army and used as a meeting place and storage depot for the Local Defence Forces, a wartime reserve force.

== The disaster ==
On the night of the wall collapse, there had been heavy rain and a weak wall filled with water became porous at its foundations from disuse. At approximately 12:45am on the morning of 4 March, the sixty-foot high wall gave way and collapsed onto the adjacent houses of King's Terrace and part of Barker Street killing and injuring some of the occupants as they slept. A section of more than a hundred feet of wall fell in total demolishing four houses and damaging a further three. The storage of turf by the army had contributed to the problem of dampness that caused the walls to become porous. It is further believed that additional pressure had been placed on the old jail wall by rain-sodden turf which was being stored in the premises by the army for heating purposes due to the shortage of imported coal.

== Aftermath ==
Crowds assisted local emergency services in removing the heavy rubble, but there was nothing they could do, and nine bodies were pulled from the jail ruins, including a number of children, the youngest being two years old. Those who lost their lives in the Jail Wall tragedy were: James Roche (age 60 years), Thomas Roche (age 20 years), Maureen Roche (age 16 years), James (Seamus) Roche (age 6 years), James Barrett (age 11 years), Kitty Barrett (age 9 years), Joseph Upton (age 60 years), Patrick Upton (age 15 years), and Betty Steward (age 2 years). Seventeen people were injured.

The subsequent funerals were among the largest ever seen in Waterford City. Many hundreds attended the funerals over the following days as the city descended into a period of mourning with shops closing and blinds being drawn. Huge crowds of mourners lined the street as bands played the Dead March in Saul by Handel. The jail was eventually demolished in 1949.

== Memorial ==
Over sixty years later, a special memorial has been unveiled by Waterford City Council.
