= State (Burke) v Lennon =

Irish Supreme Court case

State (Burke) v. Lennon
- Court: Supreme Court of Ireland
- Full case name: State (Burke) v. Lennon and the Attorney General
- Decided: 1940
- Citation: [1940] I.R. 136

Case history
- Appealed from: High Court

Court membership
- Judges sitting: Sullivan C.J., Murnaghan, Meredith, Geoghegan, and Johnston JJ

Keywords
- Constitution of Ireland; Habeas Corpus; Internment without trial

State (Burke) v Lennon [1940] I.R. 136 was a landmark case during a transitional time for the Constitution of Ireland. The case took place from 28 November 1939 to 9 February 1940 and examined an "internment without trial" under the Offences Against the State Act 1939 in the context of habeas corpus, governed by Article 40.4 of the Irish Constitution. It was a landmark decision in establishing the power of the judiciary to declare legislation unconstitutional. In the High Court, judge George Gavan Duffy held the decision that internment without trial when ordered by a minister was inconsistent with the right "not to be deprived of personal liberty save in accordance with the law" of article 40.4 On appeal by the government, the Supreme Court of Ireland upheld Duffy's decision.

== Case details ==
James Burke (also known and addressed by his Irish name, Seamás de Búrca), a man associated with the Irish Republican Army (IRA), was arrested in Friarsquare, Ballinrobe in County Mayo, under section 55 of the Offences Against the State Act 1939, for alleged activities "calculated to prejudice the preservation of the peace, order, or security of the State" after it was discovered that Burke possessed "seditious" and incriminating documents in his home in County Mayo. The nature of the alleged documents found at Burke's home remains unclear.

This case took place during World War II, called The Emergency in Ireland. Although Ireland remained neutral during the conflict, Ireland's main trading partner, the United Kingdom, was part of the Allied powers and were at war with the Axis powers. The main concerns of the Irish government at the time, other than rationing food, energy, and basic necessities, was the presence of armed groups such as the IRA and the threat to neutrality these groups caused.

The Offences against the State Act 1939 gave the Minister for Justice the power to order the internment of persons without trial. The Minister for Justice was Gerald Boland, a Fianna Fáil party member. He issued the warrant to arrest James Burke:

"I, Gerald Boland, a Minister of State, in exercise of the powers conferred on me by section 55 of the Offences Against the State Act, 1939 (No. 13 of 1939), and being satisfied that James Burke of Friarsquarter, Ballinrobe, County Mayo, is engaged in activities calculated to prejudice the preservation of the security of the State do by this warrant order the arrest and detention of the said James Burke under the said section.

(Signed)

Gerald Boland, A Minister of State. A warrant, dated the 16th day of September, 1939"

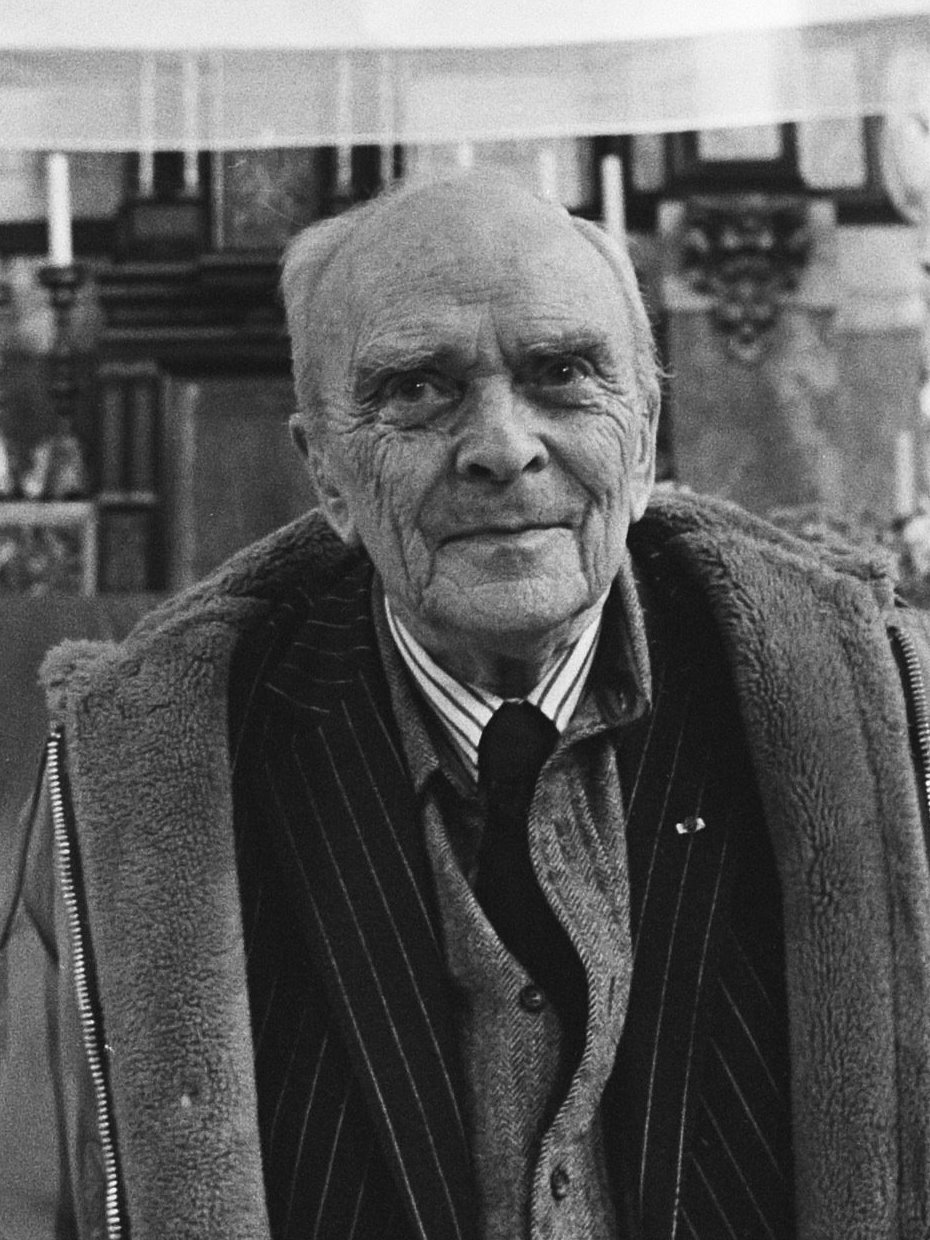
Seán MacBride

After learning of the arrest of his brother, Raymond Burke took a case against Captain Michael Lennon, the commandant of the Arbour Hill Prison where James was held. Captain Michael Lennon had been involved in other Supreme Court cases such as State (Ryan) v. Lennon [1937] and the State (Walsh) v. Lennon [1942]. James was unable to attend the case because of his detention, and thus an affidavit was used in his stead. Raymond enlisted the help of Seán MacBride, a barrister and former Chief of Staff of the IRA. MacBride argued the wording of "whenever a Minister of State is satisfied that any particular is engaged in activities calculated to prejudice the preservation of peace, order and or, security of the State, such Minister may be warrant under his hand order the arrest and detention of such person under this section". This was held to be in direct contention and conflict of Article 40 of the 1937 Irish Constitution, which states that "no person shall be deprived of his personal liberty save in accordance with the law." The judge presiding over Burke's case, George Gavan Duffy, ruled that only a judge can order an arrest and, as the minister was obviously not a judge, thus the statute was deemed unconstitutional. Duffy held that internment without trial was inconsistent with the right "not to be deprived of personal liberty save in accordance with law".

== Judgement ==
The Supreme Court ruled by a narrow majority in favor of the Burke brothers. This ruling stopped the internment without trial unless it was by an order of a judge. As a result of this decision, the government released IRA prisoners detained under the original premise. There was no possible appeal for this case. The Taoiseach Éamon de Valera claimed that the ruling would put the legislature and the judiciary "at loggerheads" and stated the government would have to introduce new legislation to nullify the decision as quickly as possible. The government brought in Offences Against the State (Amendment) Act 1940 which effectively overturned the Supreme Court. It is believed that some of the released prisoners instigated the raid on the Magazine Fort in Phoenix Park. The raid netted over a million rounds of ammunition and required 13 lorries; although there were no casualties the raid resulted in a major security alert.

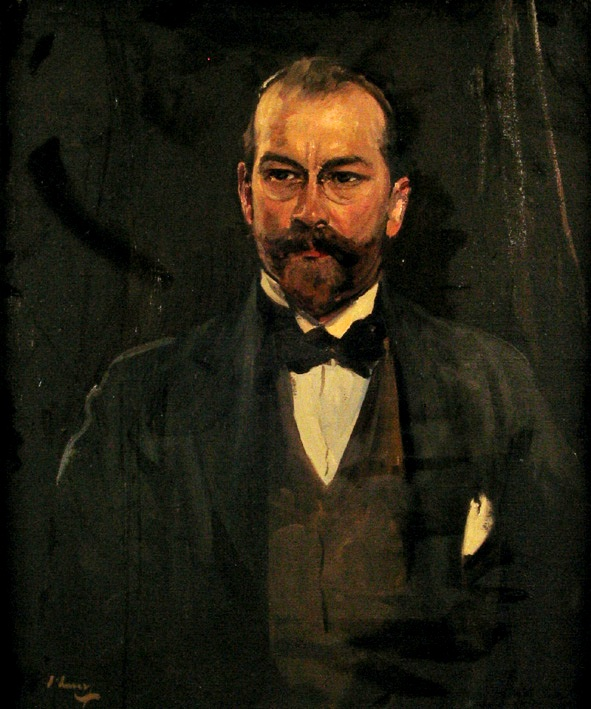
George Gavan Duffy, High Court Judge

== Precedents ==
State (Burke) v Ireland was during the very start and formative years of the Irish constitution and there was no precedent under Irish Law thus the Irish government allowed the use of precedents from other common law countries such as England.

=== Precedents used ===
- Cox v. Hakes [1890] House of Lords

This was an English case where the judge ruled on habeas corpus or internment without trial where the state must justify detention.
