= Damache v DPP =

Irish Supreme Court case

Damache v DPP and others
- Coat of arms of Ireland
- Court: Supreme Court of Ireland
- Citation: [2012] 13 ILRM 153; [2012] IESC 11; [2012] 2 IR 266
- Transcript: https://www.bailii.org/ie/cases/IESC/2012/S11.html

Case history
- Appealed from: High Court
- Appealed to: Supreme Court of Ireland

Court membership
- Judges sitting: Denham CJ, Murray J, Hardiman J, Fennelly J, O'Donnell J

Case opinions
- The Supreme Court held that any search warrant issued by a person who is associated with the investigation was invalid.
- Decision by: Denham CJ

Keywords
- Constitution; Personal Rights; Right to inviolability of the dwelling; Search warrant; Proportionality; judicial review; Unconstitutional

Damache v DPP [2012] IESC 11; [2012] 13 ILRM 153; [2012] 2 IR 266 is an Irish Supreme Court case which considered whether section 29(1) of the Offences Against the State Act 1939 was unconstitutional. This statutory provision allowed a member of An Garda Siochana, who possessed a rank not below that of superintendent, to issue a search warrant to another Garda who possessed a rank not below that of sergeant. The Supreme Court held that any search warrant issued by a person who is associated with the investigation was invalid. In this case, such a person was a deemed to be a member of the Gardaí. Thus, section 29(1) was declared unconstitutional and any evidence taken from the search warrant was inadmissible.

== Background ==
An investigation was launched into an alleged conspiracy to murder concerning a Mr Lars Vilks, who was a Swedish cartoonist that had portrayed the Muslim prophet Muhammad with the body of a dog. This caused an uproar in the Muslim community and a conspiracy to murder Mr Vilks was made. It was suspected that Damache, along with other individuals, were involved in this conspiracy. In addition, it was suspected that he made a threatening phone call to a person in America on 9 January 2010. Damache while in custody admitted that he had made a phone call of a threatening nature on 9 January 2010. A search warrant was granted under section 29(1) of the Offences against the State Act 1939 to search Damache's home. This search warrant was executed.

Subsequently, Damache was charged with an offence of threat by telephone under section 13 Post Office (Amendment) Act 1951. This was different to what he was originally arrested for which was conspiracy to murder. Damache argued that section 29(1) was against the Constitution as it allowed a search warrant to be issued by a member of the Gardai who was not independent of the investigation.

Damache sought judicial review, seeking:

1. A declaration that section 29(1) is repugnant to the constitution; and
2. A stay on any further steps being taken in the case against him.

The High Court refused his application, therefore, Damache decided to appeal this ruling to the Supreme Court.

The Supreme Court allowed the appeal.

== Submissions of the parties ==
Damache submitted that the person making the decision as to the granting of a search warrant, should be "independent, impartial and have no material interest". He further argued that section 29(1) was contrary to the Constitution and that it fails to reflect the essential balance between the requirements of common good and protection of an individual's constitutional rights.

The Director of Public Prosecutions, who were respondents to this appeal, submitted that this section was not in contrast to the Constitution and that it was necessary to prosecute people for offences against the state and against the justice system. It was further argued that any such diminution in rights was "proportionate and lawful."

== Holding of the Supreme Court ==
This case was appealed from the High Court. It was brought in advance of the trial. No evidence had been brought forward yet. However to settle this case, evidence was not required to be heard. The issue in this case was that Damache's house was searched on the basis of a warrant issued by a Garda Superintendent. Section 29(1) of the Offences against the State Act 1939 was amended by section 5 of the Criminal Law Act 1976. The amendment allows a Garda, who possessed a rank not below that of superintendent, to issue a warrant to another Garda, who possessed a rank not below that of sergeant. Furthermore, it was made clear by the courts that this was an administrative act but not an administration of justice and therefore, it did not have to be decided by a judge. Typically, a District Court judge would make such a decision. This role should be exercised judicially so as to ensure the decision is impartial and fair. Members of the Garda Siochana is allowed to issue a warrant in situations which require to act immediately and should only be exercised if it is the only last resort. These kind of warrants need to be executed within 24 hours whereas warrants under section 29 remain valid for about a week. Damache contested that the decision to issue a warrant should be made by someone who is unconnected to the investigation and by someone does not receive any benefits from issuing a warrant so that the decision made is fair. The Supreme Court cited a case called The People (DPP) v Birney, where the judge construed the meaning of section 29. This Court agreed with the literal interpretation adopted by the judge in Birney to conclude that section 29 does not prohibit a member of the Garda Siochana to issue a warrant. It was also said that the said provision does not mean the superintendent cannot be a part of the investigation. Nevertheless, the Supreme Court held that it was a well established principle that the individual granting the search warrant should be independent and impartial. Damache argued that section 29(1) fails to account for a balance between common good and his personal rights, thus making the subsection contrary to the Constitution. Respondents submitted that section 29(1) was formed to protect the state from individuals who commit crimes against the state. As this case involves a constitutional challenge, the double construction rule needs to be applied. This rule obliges a court to prefer a view that the section under scrutiny is constitutional rather than unconstitutional if the provision allows for two interpretations.

When issuing a warrant there are two prerequisite conditions which must be satisfied. Firstly, the person issuing the warrant must be independent to the investigation. Secondly, such a person must ensure that there are reasonable grounds for the issuance of a search warrant. Section 29(1) permits the issuance of a search warrant of any place which the Garda thinks will have evidence relating to the investigation. In this case, the Garda believed that a firearm would be found at Damache's house. However, a home is protected under the constitution. Article 40.5 of the constitution protects the house of every citizen and prohibits anyone to forcibly enter save in accordance with law. Also, the search of the house took place in front of Damache and he was provided with a file of the case. Furthermore, he was given an opportunity to call a lawyer. The search consisted of the checking of the phone and television sets and the investigating officials did not search any furniture, look at any documents or seize anything. The Court stated there should be a proportionate balance between the requirements of common good and the protection of individual's rights but there may be an exception if there is a situation of urgency.

The Supreme Court held that the Garda in this case was not independent of the investigation and thus the issuance of a warrant was not made in a manner as required by the law. In addition, the search carried out was at Damache's house which was protected under the constitution. So, the Court decided to allow the appeal as section 29(1) of the Offences against the State Act 1939 is against the constitution which aims to protect the dwellings of all citizens.

== See also ==
- Offences against the State Acts 1939–1998
