= Stephen Hayes (Irish republican) =

Irish republican (1902-74)

Chief of Staff of the Irish Republican Army
- In office April 1939 – June 1941
- Preceded by: Seán Russell
- Succeeded by: Pearse Kelly

Personal details
- Born: 26 December 1902 Enniscorthy, County Wexford, Ireland
- Died: 28 December 1974 (aged 72) St. John's Hospital, Enniscorthy, County Wexford, Ireland
- Party: Cumann Poblachta na hÉireann

Military service
- Branch/service: Fianna Éireann; Irish Republican Army
- Battles/wars: Irish War of Independence; Irish Civil War

Stephen Hayes (26 December 1902 – 28 December 1974) was a member and leader of the Irish Republican Army (IRA) from April 1939 to June 1941.

== Early life ==
Hayes was born in Enniscorthy, County Wexford. During the Irish War of Independence, he was Commandant of the Wexford Brigade of Fianna Éireann. He took the Anti-Treaty side during the Irish Civil War, during which he was interned in Curragh Camp. In 1936 he was one of two candidates put forward by the Irish republican political party Cumann Poblachta na hÉireann for election to the 8th Dáil. In that years Wexford by-election he received 2.85 percent share of the vote but failed to get elected.

Hayes was active in Gaelic Athletic Association circles in Wexford. In 1925, he helped Wexford win the Leinster Senior Football title. He also served as secretary to the county board for ten years, from the 1920s to 1930s.

== IRA activities ==
Hayes joined the IRA and was on the IRA Army Council in January 1939 when it declared war on the British government. (see the S-Plan).

When IRA chief of staff Seán Russell departed on IRA business to the United States (and subsequently to Nazi Germany), Hayes became IRA Chief of Staff. His time in office was marred by controversy and it is widely believed that he served as an informer to the Irish Police – the Garda Síochána.

On 9 September 1939, Hayes was almost captured during a Garda raid on an IRA safehouse at 16 Rathmines Grove in Dublin. While Hayes evaded capture, many GHQ members were captured alongside a significant amount of cash. By early 1940, Hayes was the only member of executive council still active in Ireland – with Russell overseas and the remaining members imprisoned.

As IRA Chief of Staff, Hayes sent a plan for the invasion of Northern Ireland by German troops to Germany in April 1940. This plan later became known as Plan Kathleen. He is also known to have met with German agent Hermann Görtz on 21 May 1940 in Dublin shortly after the latter's parachuting into Ireland on 5 May 1940 as part of Operation Mainau. Hayes is known to have asked Görtz for money and arms to wage a campaign in Northern Ireland but Gortz was reluctant to provide funds. Shortly after this meeting the original Plan Kathleen was discovered. The discovery of the plan led to the acceleration of joint British and Irish military planning for a German invasion known as Plan W.

On 15 August 1940 Hayes organized meeting of senior IRA men at an address on Rathgar Road, Dublin (Hayes was not in attendance). The meeting was raided by police and resulted in a gun battle in which two Detectives were killed and one wounded. Senior IRA men Paddy McGrath and Tom Harte were arrested, charged with the murders and tried by Military Tribunal, established under the Emergency Powers Act 1939. They challenged the legislation in the High Court, seeking a writ of habeas corpus, and ultimately appealed to the Supreme Court. They were represented in the courts by Seán MacBride. The appeal was unsuccessful, and they were executed by firing squad at Dublin's Mountjoy Prison on 6 September 1940. At the time of these arrests Hayes was the IRA Chief of Staff. In his written confession Hayes admits to providing the address of the meeting to government officials which resulted in the capture of Harte and McGrath.

The Officer Commanding (O/C) of the IRA's Northern Command, Seán McCaughey, arrived in Dublin in May 1941, and witnessed Hayes' use of non-IRA personnel and a largely dormant "government of Ireland". McCaughey demanded that the GHQ be re-organised, and Hayes appointed McCaughey and his adjutant Charles McGlade into IRA GHQ. Following a raid on the safe house McCaughey was staying in, he became distrustful of Hayes and was convinced he was an agent of the state.

On 30 June 1941, McCaughey arranged to meet with Hayes at a safe house in Coolock, Dublin. When Hayes arrived, IRA men aligned to McCaughey kidnapped Hayes and took him to the Cooley Mountains, accusing him of being a spy for the Free State government. From there, Hayes was taken to the Wicklow Mountains before ultimately Castlewood Park in Rathmines. Hayes was court-martialed by three senior IRA men – Charlie McCarthy from Cork, Tom Farrell from Connemara and Pearse Kelly from Tyrone. All three sentenced him to death on 23 July 1941. By his own account, he was tortured and court-martialed for treason by his comrades, and would have been executed, but McCaughey was concerned by the lack of a written confession and Hayes bought himself time composing an enormously long confession (160 pages) which he only signed on the 28 August.

On 2 September, McCaughey was arrested by Gardaí, stalling Hayes' execution further. On 8 September, Hayes was left unguarded and managed to steal a gun before throwing himself out a window to escape and handing himself in to the Garda for protection. Hayes gave evidence against McCaughey and others, and McCaughey was later convicted by a special military court on 18 September 1941 for Hayes kidnapping. After a long hunger and thirst strike in Portlaoise prison, McCaughey died on 11 May 1946.

Hayes was later sentenced to five years' imprisonment by the Special Criminal Court on account of his IRA activities. Upon his release and until his death Hayes held that his confession was fiction, made under duress and torture. The controversy surrounding the confession of Hayes was never authoritatively settled.

Within IRA circles, Hayes is still considered a traitor and an informer. One of the main allegations against him was that he informed the Garda Síochána about IRA arms dumps in Wexford. However, this was later blamed on a Wexford man named Michael Deveraux, an officer of the Wexford Battalion of the IRA who was subsequently abducted and executed by an IRA squad in County Tipperary on Hayes’ orders. George Plant, a Protestant IRA veteran, was later executed in Portlaoise for Devereux's murder.

== Later life ==
After his release, Hayes worked as a fishery bailiff in Carrick-on-Suir, County Tipperary, and was later employed by Kavanagh & Kent veterinary surgeons in Enniscorthy . He also held a clerical position at Wexford County Council. His brother, Thomas Hayes, was a member of Enniscorthy Urban Council and a former member of Wexford County Council.

He died at St. John's Hospital in Enniscorthy on 28 December 1974, aged 71.

== See also ==
- Irish Republican Army–Abwehr collaboration – Main article on IRA–Abwehr links
