= George Plant =

Irish Republican Army member

George Plant (5 January 1904 – 5 March 1942) was a member of the Irish Republican Army (IRA) who was executed by the Irish Government in 1942.

== Early life, IRA service, arrest and prison ==
George Plant was born into a Church of Ireland farming family in Fethard, County Tipperary on 5 January 1904, the second eldest child and son in a family of six children. His parents were John William Albert Plant, a farmer, and Catherine Hayden.

On a Sunday in 1916, Plant and his older brother Jimmy were arrested by the Royal Irish Constabulary (RIC) after being seen speaking to two well known Republicans, Seán Hayes and Dan Breen. In custody the two brothers were beaten and mistreated; they both developed a hatred of the RIC. Plant served with the Third Tipperary Brigade of the IRA during the Irish War of Independence and with the Anti-Treaty IRA in the Irish Civil War.

In 1923, Plant and his brother Jimmy left Ireland for Canada and the United States but continued as active IRA members. In 1929 they returned to Ireland and carried out a bank raid in Tipperary town on behalf of the IRA (17 April 1929). They were arrested two days later at the family farm and subsequently sentenced to 7 years in prison. In 1932, they were released in a general amnesty after the election victory of the Fianna Fáil party and Éamon de Valera as Taoiseach (Prime Minister and head of government of Ireland).

In 1939, following the outbreak of World War II, (known in Ireland as The Emergency), de Valera was determined to maintain Irish neutrality and would not allow the IRA to jeopardise this policy. The IRA links with Germany and the IRA's 1939-40 sabotage/bombing campaign in Britain (the S-Plan) severely strained Anglo-Irish relations and emergency legislation was introduced in both Ireland and The United Kingdom.

== Stephen Hayes, Michael Devereux and George Plant ==
Sean Russell, the IRA Chief of Staff, died in August 1940 after taking ill on board a U-boat and Stephen Hayes from County Wexford became IRA chief of staff (Plant was a strong supporter of Seán Russell). On 22 August 1940 an address on Lansdowne Road Dublin was raided by the Garda Síochána. Among the men arrested was Michael Devereux, a 24-year-old married truck driver from County Wexford who was also Quartermaster of the IRAs Wexford Brigade. He was released after three days without charge. Shortly afterwards Gardaí in County Wexford found an IRA arms dump. Many in the IRA suspected that Devereux had turned informer, so Stephen Hayes ordered Devereux's execution. One of the main allegations made against Hayes was that he informed the Garda Síochána about IRA arms dumps in Wexford and set up Devereux as the informer. Within IRA circles, Hayes is still considered a traitor and an informer. In June 1941 (while being held captive) Hayes wrote a four page confession to the charges of providing information to the Irish Government.

Plant and another man, Michael Walsh from County Kilkenny, were ordered to carry out the execution of Devereux. Michael Devereux met Plant and Walsh who told Devereux that Tom Cullimore, the Wexford Brigade's OC was blamed for the discovery of the arms dump and that Plant and Walsh had shot him. They ordered Devereux to drive them to an IRA Safe house at Grangemockler in South County Tipperary. Devereux, believing he was a suspect in a murder, stayed willingly at the safe house. A week later, on 27 September 1940, Devereux was invited to go for a walk with Plant and Paddy Davern, the owner of the safe house. Somewhere along the walk Plant accused Devereux of being an informer and shot him dead. Plant was arrested nine weeks later on suspicion of IRA membership and brought before the Special Criminal Court in Dublin.

=== Trials and execution ===
In September 1941 Stephen Hayes was himself taken prisoner and accused of being an informer by a group of Northern IRA members led by Seán McCaughey. Hayes managed to escape his guards and fled to a Garda station. Shortly afterwards a large force of Garda Síochána and Irish Army descended on the area around the Davern farmhouse where they found Devereux's car buried under an onion bed and eventually discovered Devereux's body on Slievenamon mountain, a year to the day after his death. Two weeks later, Plant, already in prison on IRA membership charges, was charged with Devereux's murder. A trial was held with a senior IRA officer Joseph O'Connor also charged with Devereux's murder. The first trial collapsed after two days when Paddy Davern and Micheal Walsh, two of the prosecution witnesses, refused to give evidence. This result led to the court issuing a nolle prosequi order which should have meant the end of the affair, however both men were rearrested and recharged with the same offence, under Emergency Order 41f. Justice minister Gerald Boland transferred the case to a Special Military Court with army officers acting as judges. The men were represented by Seán MacBride who argued (unsuccessfully) that it was a fundamental rule of law that a person could not be put in jeopardy twice for the same offence. The Military Tribunal system was established under the Emergency Powers Act 1939 and has been referred to as: "...draconian legislation re-introducing internment, flogging and the death penalty for subversive activity." The Offences against the State Acts 1939–1998 allowed for the detention of persons deemed dangerous to state security and was used during the Border campaign (Irish Republican Army) 1956-1962.

In addition to Plant, Joseph O'Connor, Paddy Davern and Michael Walsh were also now charged with Devereux's murder. The second trial began at Collins Barracks, Dublin in February 1942 with Seán MacBride, the former IRA Chief of Staff and future government minister again serving as the defendant's barrister. Davern stated his original statement was given at gunpoint but under the new order even statements given under duress were admissible. The court only had two sentencing options; death or acquittal. Joseph O'Connor was acquitted and despite MacBride's best efforts the other three were sentenced to death. Davern and Walsh had their sentences commuted to life imprisonment, and were both released in 1946. On 5 March 1942 (just one week after sentence was passed) Plant was executed in Portlaoise Prison by a six-man firing squad drawn from the Military Police of the Irish army. Plant's body was buried in the grounds of the prison.

Much bitterness was caused by the treatment of Plant's relatives; neither his wife or mother or infant son were allowed to visit him in the week before his execution. His family only learned of his execution from a brief radio broadcast before they received a telegram, censorship ensured there was little mention in the newspapers. The night before Plant's execution there was a small protest on Cathal Brugha street in Dublin.

Plant was buried in the grounds of Portlaoise Prison, but was reinterred on 19 September 1948, when he was buried with full IRA military honours in his local church St Johnstown in Fethard, County Tipperary, and a Celtic cross was erected over his grave. His wife moved to the US where she remarried. Plant's brother Jimmy died in London in 1978. The Plant's family farm is now part of the Coolmore Estate.
