= EPO 362 =

Emergency Powers (No. 362) Order 1945 or EPO 362 (Statutory Rules and Orders No. 198 of 1945) was an Irish ministerial order which penalised members of the Irish Defence Forces who had deserted since the beginning of the Emergency proclaimed at the start of World War II, during which the state was neutral. The order deprived those affected of pension entitlements and unemployment benefits accrued prior to their desertion, and prohibited them from employment in the public sector for a period of seven years. Most of those affected had deserted to join the armed forces of belligerents: in almost all cases those of the Allies, and mainly the British Armed Forces.

The order was made on 8 August 1945 by Éamon de Valera as Taoiseach in the then Government, using power granted to the government under the Emergency Powers Act 1939 passed on the outbreak of the War. It was revoked with effect from 1 August 1946, a month before the 1939 act lapsed; but it was in effect continued by section 13 of the Defence Forces (Temporary Provisions) Act 1946. While some deserters had been court-martialled by the time the order was issued, most were abroad: some still on active service, others demobilised but afraid to return. For such people, the order forestalled any court-martial or consequent punishment. The order only applied to members of the Army Reserve or who had enlisted for the duration of the Emergency; pre-war soldiers who deserted remained liable to court-martial. Canny lists four motivations for the order: as positive discrimination for those who had remained in the Defence Forces; to deter future desertions; to allow deserters to return to Ireland; and to provide a simpler, cheaper alternative to courts-martial. A list of personnel affected by the order was maintained by the government; it was published in 2011. Bernard Kelly has called the order "a highly pragmatic piece of political calculation".

On 18 October 1945, T. F. O'Higgins proposed in the Dáil, seconded by Patrick McGilligan, that the order be annulled, and dubbed it the starvation order because of the hardship imposed. Richard Mulcahy objected that only enlisted men were covered, not officers. Matthew O'Reilly argued the order's penalties were in fact more lenient than those to which deserters would otherwise have been subject under military law. Canny states that in practice those covered by the order were more severely treated than those already arrested and tried. O'Higgins' motion was defeated. The Exchange Telegraph report on the motion was published in many foreign newspapers, causing Joseph Walshe to complain that it gave "a mere routine measure of Army administration the character of an act of political vengeance".

The Defence Forces (Temporary Provisions) Act 1949 ended the 1946 act's prohibition on public-sector employment. This was because some of those classed as deserters under the EPO were reservists with no forwarding address: "While they were elsewhere, they were called up, but did not get the call and, consequently, did not respond to it." The permanent Defence Act 1954 repealed all earlier temporary defence acts including those of 1946 and 1949.

In the 2000s a campaign began for pardons for those who deserted to join the Allied forces. The Defence Forces (Second World War Amnesty and Immunity) Act 2013 provided an amnesty rather than a pardon, because the Constitution of Ireland provides that a pardon can only be granted individually by the President. The amnesty covered 4,634 people affected by the 1945 order or the 1946 act, and about 2,500 others who had been court-martialled or prosecuted in court. Michael Kennedy of the Royal Irish Academy has called for study of the motives and backgrounds of those who deserted, noting that desertion was highest in units near the Irish border.

== Sources ==
- Department of the Taoiseach (8 August 1945). "Emergency powers (no. 362) order 1945" (PDF). Government publications. Dublin: Stationery Office.
- Canny, Liam (1998–99). "Pariah Dogs: Deserters from the Irish Defence Forces Who Joined the British Armed Forces during 'The Emergency'". Studia Hibernica (30): 231–249. JSTOR 20495095.
- Kelly, Bernard (December 2012). "'True Citizens' and 'Pariah Dogs': demobilisation, deserters and the de Valera government, 1945". The Irish Sword. XXVIII (114): 455–470 – via Academia.edu.
