= John Roche (detective) =

- Born: 11 June 1905; Abbeyfeale, County Limerick, Ireland
- Died: 4 January 1940 (aged 34); Cork, Ireland
- Resting place: Abbeyfeale, County Limerick, Ireland
- Known for: Garda Síochána Detective assassinated by the IRA in 1940
- Spouse: May Roche
- Relatives: Son of Edmond J. Roche and Mary Anne Woulfe
- Police career
- Country: Garda Síochána
- Allegiance: Ireland
- Service years: 1923 - 1940
- Status: Deceased
- Rank: Detective

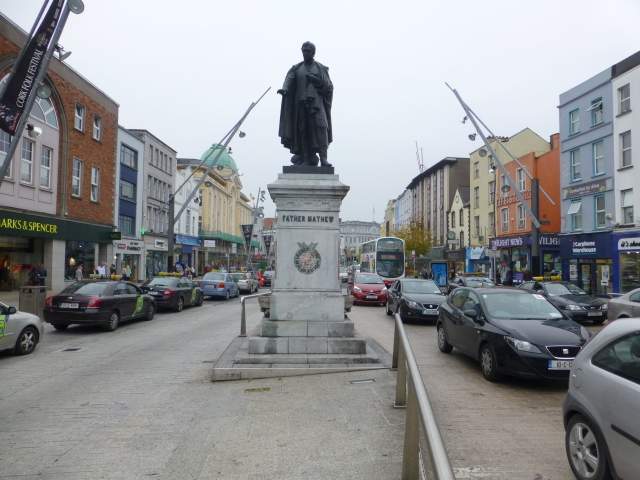
St Patrick's Street, Cork, the site of Roche's murder

John Roche (11 June 1905 – 4 January 1940) was a Garda Síochána Detective who was assassinated in 1940 during the Irish Emergency, becoming the first and most highly publicised Garda casualty of the period and resulting in widespread opposition to the Anti-Treaty IRA.

== Life ==
Roche was born on 11 June 1905 in Abbeyfeale, County Limerick. His mother Mary Anne Woulfe came from a landed Catholic family, the daughter of merchant John Richard Woulfe. His father Edmond J. Roche was a farmer and peace commissioner.

Having worked in farming, Roche joined the Special Detective Unit on 11 July 1923. He served in Kinnegad, Dungourney and elsewhere in Cork, before moving to Union Quay in 1937, where he served as Food and Drugs Inspector and in plain clothes. He was married to May Roche.

== Assassination and trial ==
On 3 January 1940, Roche was shot fatally by Tomás Óg Mac Curtain, an IRA commandant and the son of Sinn Féin Lord Mayor of Cork Tomás Mac Curtain, who had been assassination by the Royal Irish Constabulary during the Irish War of Independence. Roche and two fellow Gardaí approached and attempted to question Mac Curtain about illegal activities when the latter produced and fired a revolver. Roche was taken to the North Infirmary Hospital, where he died from his wounds the following day.

A cortège funeral was held on 6 January. Roche's coffin was carried from Cork to Mallow and to his final resting place in Abbeyfeale, where Gerald Boland, Minister for Justice, tendered his sympathy. Other attendees included Michael Kinnane, Patrick Brennan, Patrick Carroll, and James Hickey.

The case aroused considerable interest in Ireland. Following an inquest held on 8 January, Mac Curtain was tried convicted of murder and sentenced to death by hanging. A statement issued on 10 July 1940 declared: "The President, acting on the advice of the government, has commuted the sentence of death on Thomas MacCurtain to penal servitude for life".

Mac Curtain was later granted clemency and released after seven years incarceration.

== Legacy ==
Similarly to the 1942 ambush slaying of Garda Siochana Detective Sergeant Denis O'Brien, Detective Roche's death at the hands of the IRA caused widespread public hostility to the movement and strengthened support among the Irish people for the Fianna Fáil government.

The historian Uinseann MacEoin observed that some Gardaí in the Special Detective Unit were understandingly outraged following the murder of Detective Roche and the leniency granted to his killer. John Joseph Kavanagh, an IRA Volunteer, was fatally shot by the Garda Síochána on 3 August 1940 during an attempt to break IRA prisoners out of Cork Prison. Inspector Jim Moore, who led the Gardaí who prevented the prison break, later boasted that he considered Kavanagh's death to be retribution for the murder of Detective Roche.
