= Patrick McGrath (Irish republican) =

Irish republican (1894-1940)

Patrick MacGrath (1894 – 6 September 1940) was born into an old Dublin republican family and took part in the 1916 Rising (fighting on Church Street), as did two of his brothers. He was held in Frongoch internment camp after the 1916 Rising and served his time there. He was a senior member of the Irish Republican Army (IRA), hunger striker, IRA Director of Operations and Training during its major bombing/sabotage in England. McGrath was the first of six IRA men executed by the Irish Government between 1940–1944. After participating in the Easter Rebellion, MacGrath remained in the IRA, rising in rank and becoming a major leader within the organisation.

== Background ==
On 19 February 1920 Paddy and Gabriel MacGrath (later to be a leading member of the IRA Active service unit in Derry City, known as the Ten Foot Pikers) were returning from an IRA operation to their home in Rathmines, Dublin. Paddy was seriously wounded in a gun battle with police after an unsuccessful raid for ammunition in Dublin. In this incident Constable John Walsh of Galbally, Co. Wexford was killed, his companion, Sgt Dunleavy was wounded. MacGrath's wounds were so extensive (a bullet was lodged in his shoulder which was never removed) that it was found impossible to bring him to trial and after a long detention in hospital he was released. This incident ended the practice of arming uniformed Dublin Metropolitan Police and the imposition of a midnight to 5 am curfew. The murder of Constable Walsh was followed up by one of the most dramatic police and military raids in Dublin since the Easter Rising four years earlier. Military lorries, an armoured car, and a tank drove to a blinds shop owned by the MacGraths at 16/17 Aungier Street, Dublin. The shop is referred to in James Joyce's Ulysses as where Leopold Bloom had bought the roller blind in his bedroom. At one point in 1920 five of the McGrath boys were incarcerated at the same time.

In January 1923 McGrath and others were involved in a plot to kidnap the Prime Minister of the Irish Free State, William Cosgrave. The goal was to hold Cosgrave in order to prevent further executions of Republicans by the government. While on route to inspect the house where Cosgrave was to be held McGrath and the Cumann na mBan leader Maire Comerford were arrested and the plot was cancelled. While imprisoned both McGrath and Comerford took part in the 1923 Irish Hunger Strikes.

In 1940, MacGrath's speedy execution was in response to increased IRA activity and the bombing/sabotage campaign in England. In 1939–40, three bills giving the Government of Ireland (previously known as the Irish Free State) extraordinary powers were approved in the Dáil. The Treason Act 1939 (made the crime a capital offence), and the Offences against the State Acts 1939–1998 were quickly followed by the Emergency Powers Act 1939 (enacted Feb 1940), which imposed death sentences for persons found guilty of treason as defined in Article XXXIX of the Irish Constitution. These Acts provided the legal basis for the execution of MacGrath and other IRA men. At this time, the de Valera government was determined to uphold the state’s neutrality against the backdrop of the escalating military conflict in Europe. The executions also represented a critical break in the ruling party's Fianna Fáil turbulent relationship with the IRA. The Lord Mayor of Dublin, Kathleen Clarke, the widow of Tom Clarke (the main planner of the Easter Rebellion and first signer of the Proclamation of the Irish Republic) and sister of Edward Daly (under whom MacGrath had fought in 1916) appealed (unsuccessfully) to the Minister of Justice, Gerald Boland – himself a former IRA member for a reprieve of MacGrath's death sentence. Upon MacGrath's execution, Clarke ordered the national flag at half mast at Dublin City Hall, and closed the blinds of the Mansion House. In her autobiography Kathleen Clarke states that "McGraths execution to my mind was a crime, and I had to make a protest." The executions encouraged Clarke to eventually depart from the ruling Fianna Fáil party.

== S Plan ==
In 1938 MacGrath was the IRA’s Adjutant general and oversaw the bombing/sabotage campaign in England from the IRA GHQ. MacGrath worked on planning the "English Campaign" or "S-Plan" which targeted the civil, economic, and military infrastructure of the United Kingdom (specifically England). MacGrath was reputed to be one of the principal instructors in bomb making for this campaign. Two week classes were conducted in Dublin by Seamus O'Donovan and Paddy MacGrath. This bombing campaign took place from January 1939 to March 1940 involved approximately 300 explosions resulting in 10 deaths, 96 wounded and substantial damage to English infrastructure. As a result of the bombings in England, in 1939 the Irish government increased pressure on the IRA leading to MacGrath's arrest and quick execution.

=== Arrest and Hunger Strike ===
MacGrath was arrested on 22 October 1939 and went on hunger strike that same day, vowing that he would have his freedom or die. Interned in Arbour Hill Prison under the Offences against the State Acts 1939–1998, MacGrath remained on hunger strike. On 15 November 1939 he was removed to Jervis Street Hospital and on 4 December 1939 (after 43 days without food) escaped from the hospital with the assistance of a Republican sympathizer on the staff of the hospital. Three days later the government filed a request for non prosecution (Nolle prosequi) at Special Criminal Court.

== Final Arrest, Trial and Execution ==
Paddy MacGrath was an important leader during the IRAs S-Plan attacks on England. MacGrath provided IRA men with training and worked on logistical support. On 17 August 1940 MacGrath was again arrested at a house 98A Rathgar Road, Dublin by Special Branch detectives during another raid on the IRA's General Headquarters (GHQ). IRA Volunteer Thomas Harte was also arrested at that time and was later executed with MacGrath. They had been arrested after a gun battle with Garda Síochána (police) Special Branch in which Detective Sergeant Patrick McKeown and Detective Garda Richard Hyland were shot dead. Detective Garda Michael Brady was also wounded. As the two IRA men attempted to escape, MacGrath returned to assist the wounded Harte and both were arrested. Another IRA man (Tom Hunt) escaped but was subsequently arrested and also charged with the murders but had his death sentence commuted on the morning of execution and was interned in the Curragh prison camp. The topic of the meeting at the GHQ was reportedly planning to support "Plan Kathleen" which was a notional plan by the Nazis to invade Northern Ireland. At the time of these arrests Stephen Hayes (Irish republican) was the IRA Chief of Staff. On 30 June 1941, Northern-based IRA men kidnapped Hayes, accusing him of being a spy for the Irish Government. In his written confession Hayes admits to providing the address of the meeting to government officials which resulted in the capture Harte, McGrath and Hunt.

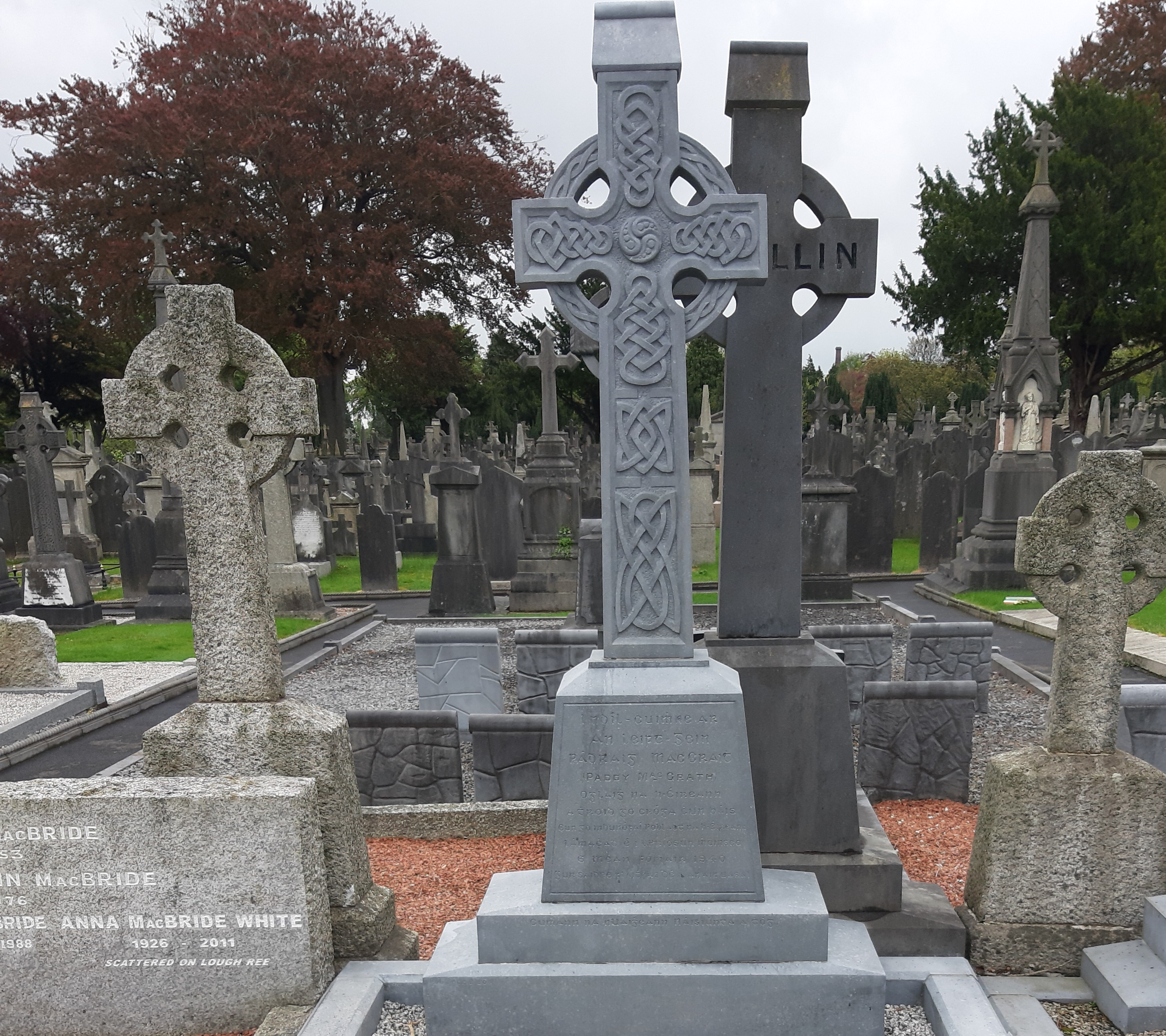
Burial Plot of Paddy MacGrath adjoining Seán MacBride and Maud Gonne MacBride

Harte, MacGrath and Hunt were tried by Military Tribunal, established under the Emergency Powers Act 1939. All three men were represented in court by the future Nobel Peace Prize winner Seán MacBride. They challenged the legislation in the Irish High Court, seeking a writ of habeas corpus, and ultimately appealed to the Irish Supreme Court. The appeal was unsuccessful (at that time there was no right to appeal the findings of a Military Tribunal) and Harte and MacGrath were executed by firing squad at Dublin's Mountjoy Prison on 6 September 1940 (22 days after the shooting).

In 1948 his remains were released to his family, he is buried in Glasnevin Cemetery. Speaking at his reburial, a founding member of Sinn Féin Brian O'Higgins stated how attitudes towards Irish Republicans had changed: "The men were put to death as criminals, outlaws, enemies, of Ireland. Today that judgement is reversed even by those who were and are opponents and they have been acknowledged to be what we have always claimed them to have been - true comrades of Tone and Emmet."

== Bibliography ==
- Beaslai, Piaras, Michael Collins and the Making of a New Ireland Vol I, London, Harper & Brothers. 1926.
- Bell, J. Bower, The Secret Army. New Brunswick, NJ: Transaction Publishers. 1997. ISBN 1560009012
- Kathleen Clarke, Revolutionary Woman, The O'Brien Press, Dublin, 2008; ISBN 978-1-84717-059-0
- Collins, Lorcan, (2019), Irelands War of Independence 1919-1921, The O'Brien Press, Dublin, ISBN 978-1-84717-950-0
- Coogan, Tim Pat, The I.R.A. London: Fontana Publishers. 1980. ISBN 0006359329
- Mark M. Hull, Irish Secrets. German Espionage in Wartime Ireland 1939–1945, 2003, ISBN 0-7165-2756-1
- McConville, Sean, Irish Political Prisoners 1920–1962, Pilgrimage to Desolation, Taylor & Francis Publishers, 2020, ISBN 1000082741
- McKenna, J, The IRA Bombing Campaign Against Britain, 1939–1940. McFarland, Incorporated Publishers. 2016. ISBN 9781476623726
- O Beachain, Donnacha, The Destiny of the Soldiers. Dublin, Gill & MacMillan, Limited. 2010, ISBN 9780717147632
