= Thomas Harte (Irish republican) =

Irish republican

Thomas Harte was the first of seven Irish Republican Army (IRA) members executed by Irish forces in Mountjoy Prison and Portlaoise Prison prisons between 1940 and 1944.

== Arrest, Plan Kathleen and S-Plan ==
On 6 September 1940 IRA Capt. Tom Harte of Lurgan, County Armagh was executed. Three weeks earlier, Capt. Harte was seriously wounded and arrested during a raid of a meeting of senior IRA men in Dublin. IRA Volunteer Patrick McGrath of Dublin (who had recently escaped from police custody) was also arrested at that time. Volunteer Tom Hunt escaped from the raid but was arrested soon after - 22 August 1940. McGrath was executed with Harte (Tom Hunt had his death sentence commuted on the morning of execution and was interned in the Curragh prison camp). They had been arrested after a gun battle with Garda (police) Special Branch in which Sergeant McKeown and Detective Hyland were shot dead. Detective Brady was also wounded (16 August 1940). The topic of the meeting was reportedly planning to support "Plan Kathleen" which was a notional plan by the Nazis to invade Northern Ireland. At the time of these arrests Stephen Hayes (Irish republican) was the IRA Chief of Staff. On 30 June 1941, Northern-based IRA men kidnapped Hayes, accusing him of being a spy for the Irish Free State government. In his written confession Hayes admits to providing the address of the meeting to government officials which resulted in the capture Harte, McGrath and Hunt.

Although information is scarce on IRA planning, during this time it was conducting a bombing/sabotage campaign in England (S-Plan). Harte had been associated with the IRA's operational planning for both plans and is said to have participated in the attacks in England. In response to the IRA's bombing campaign in England, two bills giving the Government of Eire (the territory formerly known as the Irish Free State) extraordinary powers were introduced in the Dáil (in February 1939). The first of these, called the Treason Act, imposed the death penalty for persons found guilty of treason as defined in Article XXXIX of the Irish Constitution. These Acts provided the legal basis for the execution of both Harte and McGrath.

== Trial by Military Tribunal & Execution ==
Harte was just 25 years old at the time of his arrest and execution. In 1938 Patrick McGrath was the IRA’s Adjutant General, he was also a veteran of the 1916 Easter Rising and a bullet remained lodged in his chest from that time. Harte, McGrath and Hunt were tried by Military Tribunal, established under the Emergency Powers Act 1939. All three men were represented in court by Seán MacBride. They challenged the legislation in the High Court, seeking a writ of habeas corpus, and ultimately appealed to the Irish Supreme Court. The appeal was unsuccessful (at that time there was no right to appeal the findings of a Military Tribunal). Harte and McGrath were executed by firing squad at Dublin's Mountjoy Prison on 6 September 1940 (22 days after the shooting). Harte's body was buried in an unmarked grave in the prison yard. In 1948 his remains were released to his family,

On the 50th anniversary of the Easter Rising, a crowd of 5000 supporters met to hear an oration by the veteran Irish Republican Kevin Agnew at the graveside (Lurgan cemetery) of Thomas Harte.

The North Armagh Republican Sinn Fein Cumman is named in honour of Thomas Harte. See: http://rsfnortharmagh.com/naisc-links/
