= Emergency Powers Act 1939 =

Irish legislation

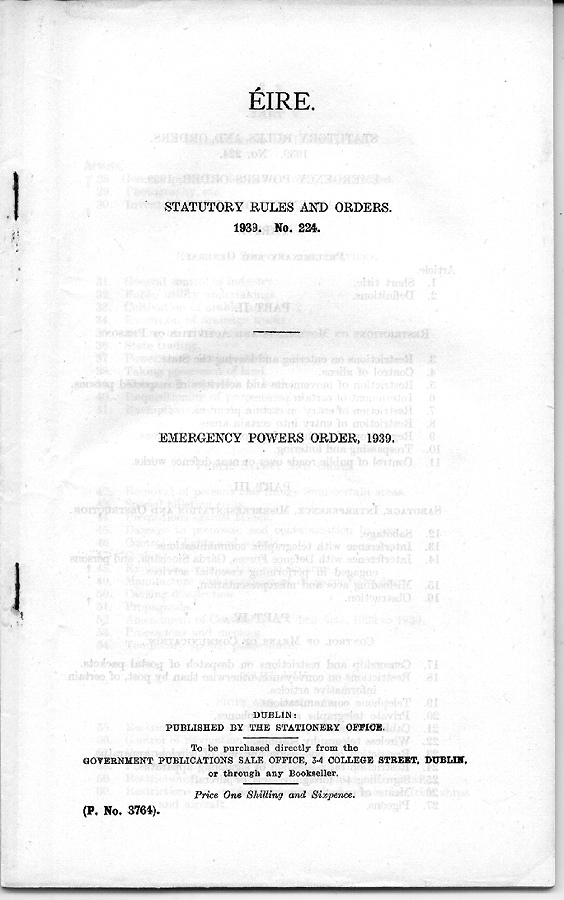
Front cover of Emergency Powers Order, 1939, under the legislation

The Emergency Powers Act 1939 (EPA) was an Act of the Oireachtas (Irish parliament) enacted on 3 September 1939, after a state of emergency had been declared on 2 September 1939 in response to the outbreak of World War II. The Act empowered the government to:

make provisions for securing the public safety and the preservation of the state in time of war and, in particular, to make provision for the maintenance of public order and for the provision and control of supplies and services essential to the life of the community, and to provide for divers and other matters (including the charging of fees on certain licences and other documents) connected with the matters aforesaid.

The EPA lapsed on 2 September 1946. The state of emergency itself was not rescinded until 1 September 1976.

== Enactment ==
As enacted in 1937, the Constitution of Ireland stated (Article 28.3.3°):

Nothing in this Constitution shall be invoked to invalidate any law enacted by the Oireachtas which is expressed to be for the purpose of securing the public safety and the preservation of the State in time of war or armed rebellion, or to nullify any act done or purporting to be done in time of war or armed rebellion in pursuance of any such law.

The Constitution also provided that, during a "war or armed rebellion", military tribunals may try civilians, and the Defence Forces are not bound by habeas corpus.

The Anglo-Irish Trade Agreement of 25 April 1938 was motivated in part by a desire by both countries to remove the distractions of the Anglo-Irish Trade War to preparations for an expected European war. After the agreement the British government shared details of the emergency laws it was preparing. The Sudetenland crisis prompted the adapting of the British "war book" for Ireland's purposes; draft legislation was already finished by 18 September 1938.

The First Amendment of the Constitution of 1939 allows an emergency to be declared during wars in which the state is a non-belligerent, subject to resolutions by the houses of the Oireachtas. This was rushed through the Oireachtas on 2 September 1939, the day after the German invasion of Poland, because the state would remain neutral in the ensuing war. Immediately after the constitutional amendment was passed, the required emergency resolution was passed, in turn enabling the passage of the EPA in the early hours of 3 September. WWII itself was never referred to officially in Ireland as "The Emergency" as is often claimed but this is a myth that grew out of the emergency powers act.

== Powers ==
The Act gave the government the ability to maintain Irish neutrality during "the Emergency" by providing it with sweeping new powers for the duration of the emergency situation; these included internment, censorship of the media, postal censorship, and additional government control of the economy. The powers given to the government by the EPA were exercised by statutory orders termed Emergency Powers Orders (EPOs) made by ministers. During the Dáil debate on the Emergency Powers Bill, Fine Gael TD John A. Costello was highly critical of the proposed increase of powers, stating that

... we are asked not merely to give a blank cheque, but, to give an uncrossed cheque to the Government.

According to Tony Gray, the EPOs "were so draconian that they effectively abolished democracy for the period, and most aspects of the life of the country were controlled by the dictatorial powers the government acquired". The Garda Síochána received extended powers of search and arrest. Compulsory cultivation of land and compulsory queuing for buses were a few topics for which EPOs were made. Once an EPO was laid before the Oireachtas, members could only annul or accept it; they could not scrutinise or amend it as they could with ordinary legislation. John A. Costello condemned the fact that EPOs could be judicially noticed in court without being introduced as evidence.

Media censorship of radio broadcasts was effected by having news bulletins read to the head of the Government Information Bureau for approval before being broadcast by Radio Éireann. Public weather forecasts were forbidden; this inconvenienced farmers and fishermen.

In 1946, Frank Aiken told the Dáil that a total of 7,864 orders had been made. Of these, 522 were made directly under the EPA, and the rest were subsidiary orders made under one of the primary orders, including about 5,330 under the Wages Standstill Orders. (Note: EPO 83 of 1941 and its amendments.) The total excluded orders made by local authorities for compulsory purchase of land for turf production and allotments, which Aiken said would take too much effort to enumerate.

== Amendment and expiry ==
The EPA originally specified a duration of one year. Amending acts, passed annually, continued the principal act until 2 September 1946, when it was allowed to lapse. There were also substantive amendments to the act's provisions; those of 1940 and 1942 increased the emergency powers, while that passed in 1945, as the war was ending, reduced them. The first 1940 amendment extended the power of internment from foreign nationals to Irish citizens, and the second 1940 amendment allowed juryless court martial of civilians. These were in response to increased activity by the Irish Republican Army (IRA); many IRA members were interned, and five (Note: A sixth, Charlie Kerins, was hanged after a trial in the Special Criminal Court (SCC). The SCC was established under the Offences against the State Act rather than the EPA.) were executed by firing squad after courts martial. Media censorship prevented much public backlash at this.

Under the 1941 Second Amendment of the Constitution, an emergency ends, not automatically when the war does, but only by Oireachtas resolutions. The EPA finally lapsed on 2 September 1946. However, the state of emergency itself was not rescinded until 1 September 1976.

=== Continued orders ===
The EPA's final year in operation began with Japan's surrender, and most EPOs were explicitly revoked before the act itself expired. The remaining orders would automatically expire when the act did. The then government wanted to keep many in force, mostly concerning economic and financial matters. These EPOs had been passed under the EPA, not because the powers they granted were otherwise unconstitutional, but because they would otherwise have required primary legislation, which is much slower to pass than secondary legislation. Several acts passed before the EPA expired kept these EPOs in force even after the EPA's expiry. The Law Reform Commission (LRC) in 2015 noted that most of these EPOs are not listed in the electronic Irish Statute Book and should be explicitly revoked "as a matter of good practice". Some of them are accessible via the Oireachtas library's online public access catalogue.

Supplies and Services (Temporary Provisions) Act, 1946
the main continuance act, in relation to production, trade, and labour cartels. The act stated that all EPOs not already revoked would remain in force. An explanatory memorandum for the bill listed, across 24 pages, the EPOs which it was proposed to include. The 1946 act was continued annually by further acts until 31 December 1957. Rationing continued until 1951.
Turf Development Act, 1946
retained EPO 92 relating to turf.
Continuation of Compensation Schemes Act, 1946
EPOs relating to compensation for war injuries and damage

Many of these EPOs were gradually revoked, according as standard primary legislation (acts of the Oireachtas) were passed in subsequent years with equivalent provisions. For example:

Defence Forces (Temporary Provisions) Act, 1946
EPO 362, which penalised deserters from the Defence Forces.
Merchant Shipping Act, 1947
EPO 2, which prescribed the Irish tricolour instead of the Red Ensign as the civil ensign
Irish Shipping Limited Act, 1947
EPOs establishing Irish Shipping
Customs (Temporary Provisions) Act 1945
EPO 52 relating to smuggling
Rent Restrictions Act, 1946
EPO 313
Widows' and Orphans' Pensions Act, 1947
EPO 382
National Health Insurance Act, 1947
EPO 381, relating to British Armed Forces pensioners
Social Welfare (Miscellaneous Provisions) Act, 1957
EPO 108, 109, and 351, for distributing food and fuel to the poor.
Superannuation Act, 1946
EPO 354

An exception which remains unrepealed is the Continuation of Compensation Schemes Act 1946. Compensation schemes originating with EPOs continued by this act were amended by statutory instruments (SIs) as late as 1979, and in 2011 the powers it grants were transferred from the Minister for Finance to the new Minister for Public Expenditure and Reform. The LRC in 2016 advised repealing the act and all its EPOs and SIs as obsolete.

== See also ==
- Irish neutrality during World War II
- List of acts of the Oireachtas
