= Offences Against the State Acts 1939 to 1998 =

The Offences Against the State Acts 1939 to 1998 is the collective citation for a series of laws in force in Ireland.

== Offences under the Act ==
The Act criminalises many actions deemed detrimental to state security. An organisation can be made subject to a suppression order under the act, after which being a member of or directing the activities of such an unlawful organisation becomes an offence. The opinion of a senior Garda can be admitted as prima facie evidence of membership. The act also criminalises obstruction of the President or government, secret societies in the police or army and unauthorised demonstrations in the vicinity of the Oireachtas, the Irish parliament.

== Special Criminal Court ==
The Special Criminal Court is created and constituted by Part V of this statute. It is authorised by Article 38 of the Constitution of Ireland to hear indictable cases without a jury when "ordinary courts are inadequate to secure the effective administration of justice".

The Court consists of a High Court, a Circuit Court and a District Court judge.

Appeals are to the Court of Appeal.

== Internment ==
This Act allows the Government to bring internment without trial into force. The Minister for Justice, Home Affairs and Migration may order the detention of persons deemed dangerous to state security. It also establishes an independent appeals commission to which prisoners can apply for release by making the case that they are not a threat to public safety. This was used during the Second World War and introduced in 1957 during the IRA border campaign and operated in the early parts of the Troubles.

== See also ==
- Good Friday Agreement
