= List of members of the Irish Republican Army =

This is a list of members of the Irish Republican Army. It is broken down in sub-lists of various organisations known as the IRA

== Irish War of Independence: 1917-1922 ==
=== A ===
- Frank Aiken (1898–1983), a founding member of Fianna Fáil; commanded the Fourth Northern Division of the Irish Republican Army (IRA) during the War of Independence. Aiken was first elected to Dáil Éireann in 1923 and would remain in politics until 1973.
- Todd Andrews (1901–1985), a member of the Irish Volunteers serving in the Irish War of Independence and participated in a 10-day hunger strike in 1920. He was later interned during the Irish Civil War after siding with Anti-Treaty forces before becoming a civil servant in his later years, most prominently as chairman of the Irish transport company, Córas Iompair Éireann.

=== B ===
- Richard Barrett (1899–1922), Irish Republican officer who was executed by the Free State during the following Civil War.
- Kevin Barry (1902–1920)
- Tom Barry (1897–1980), a prominent figure on the Irish Republican Army during the Irish War of Independence and the Irish Civil War. Although fighting with Anti-Treaty forces, he was briefly expelled from the organisation until the 1930s and was later involved in politics and writing.
- Piaras Béaslaí (1881–1965), a member of the Irish Republican Brotherhood who participated in the infiltration of the Gaelic League and fought in the Easter Rising and Irish War of Independence. He was later involved in the Sinn Féin political party and writing.
- Dan Breen (1894–1969), an early member of the Irish Volunteers and served as leader of the Irish Republican Army during the Irish War of Independence. He would later become a prominent figure in Fianna Fáil.
- George Brent (1899–1979), an American actor who acted as a courier during Irish War of Independence.
- Eamon Broy (1887–1972), an officer in the Dublin Metropolitan Police acting as a double agent during Irish War of Independence. He later served as Garda Commissioner during the mid-1930s.
- Cathal Brugha (1874–1922), former British soldier active in the Easter Rising, the Anglo-Irish War, and the Irish Civil War.
- Robert Byrne (1899–1919), trade unionist and IRA member killed in the Irish War of Independence.

=== C ===
- Michael Carolan (1875-1930), Director of Intelligence from 1922 to 1925
- Charles Carrigan (1882–1916), a member of the Irish Republican Brotherhood and served as Chairman of Sinn Féin's first cumann in Scotland before his death during the Easter Rising.
- Erskine Childers (1870–1922), British author involved in gunrunning and later member of Sinn Féin. Secretary-general of the Irish delegation during negotiation of the Anglo-Irish Treaty.
- Joe Clarke (1882–1976), remained active in Sinn Féin until his death.
- Michael Collins (1890–1922), Director of Intelligence for the IRA during the Irish War of Independence and served as Commander-In-Chief of the Irish National Army
- Andy Cooney (d. 1968), a member of the Third Battalion of the Dublin Brigade and a suspected participant in the execution of the Cairo Gang
- Timothy Coughlin (d. 1928), a member of the Dublin Brigade during the War of Independence who assassinated the Vice President of the Executive Council, Kevin O'Higgins.

=== D ===
- Paddy Daly
- Liam Deasy
- Archie Doyle
- Patrick Doyle (1892–1921), convicted of treason and executed following his participation in a failed ambush at Drumcondra on January 21, 1921.
- Edward Dorins Killed at Battle of Custom House, 25/05/1921. Shot outside the building in Beresford Place while attacking an approaching tender full of Auxiliaries.
- Eamonn Duggan

=== F ===
- Stephen Fuller (d. 1984), a member of the Irish Republican Army (IRA) during the Irish War of Independence and fought with Anti-Treaty forces during the Irish Civil War (1922–23). He would later serve as a member of Fianna Fáil during the 1930s.

=== G ===
- Bill Gannon
- George Gilmore

=== H ===
- Seán Hales
- Tom Hales
- Seán Hogan
- Charlie Hurley

=== K ===
- Sean P. Keating (1903–1976) Irish Republican Army member who fought for Anti-Treaty forces during Irish Civil War, later became Deputy Mayor of New York City.
- Paddy Killoran (1903-1965) Famed fiddle player, band leader and recording artist. Volunteer in the 3rd Sligo Battalion during the war of independence.

=== L ===
- Seán Lemass
- Liam Lynch
- Dinny Lacey

=== M ===
- Seán MacBride
- Seán Mac Eoin
- Seán MacEntee
- Terence MacSwiney
- Tom Maguire
- Ned Maguire
- Dick McKee
- Joe McKelvey
- Paddy McLogan
- Liam Mellows
- Seán Moylan
- Patrick Moylett
- Richard Mulcahy

=== O ===
- Seamus O'Donovan
- Diarmuid O'Hegarty
- Frank O'Connor
- Rory O'Connor
- Peadar O'Donnell
- Florence O'Donoghue
- Dan O'Donovan
- Eoin O'Duffy
- Ernie O'Malley
- Gearóid O'Sullivan

=== P ===
- Liam Pilkington

=== R ===
- Seán Russell
- P. J. Ruttledge
- Tommy Ryan
- Séumas Robinson

=== S ===
- Martin Savage
- Austin Stack

=== T ===
- Liam Tobin
- Oscar Traynor
- Thomas Traynor
- Seán Treacy
- Moss Twomey

== The Official Irish Republican Army & Post-Independence: 1922-present ==
=== A ===
- Gerry Adams Sr.
- Frank Aiken
- Todd Andrews

=== B ===
- Peter Barnes
- Tom Barry
- Brendan Behan
- Dominic Behan
- Dan Breen
- Cathal Brugha

=== C ===
- Joe Cahill
- Erskine Childers
- Seamus Costello
- Timothy Coughlin
- Seán Cronin

=== D ===
- Liam Deasy
- Paddy Devlin
- Archie Doyle

=== F ===
- Mick Fitzpatrick
- Stephen Fuller

=== G ===
- Bill Gannon
- Seán Garland
- George Gilmore
- Cathal Goulding

=== H ===
- Tom Hales
- Thomas Harte (Irish Republican)
- Seán Harrington
- Stephen Hayes
- Seán Hogan

=== J ===
- John Graham

=== K ===
- Dan Keating
- Liam Kelly
- Pearse Kelly (Paul Kelso)
- Charlie Kerins

=== L ===
- Seán Lemass
- Liam Lynch
- Dinny Lacey

=== M ===
- Proinsias MacAirt
- Tomás MacCurtain, commanding officer IRA members interned at Curragh Military Prison during the 1950s.
- Tomás Mac Giolla
- Seán Mac Stíofáin
- Seán MacBride
- Seán MacEntee
- Tony Magan
- Tom Maguire
- Hugh McAteer
- Joe McCann
- Seán McCaughey
- Seán McCool
- John Joe McGirl
- Charlie McGlade
- Patrick McGrath (Irish Republican)
- Billy McKee
- Joe McKelvey
- Billy McMillen
- Liam Mellows
- Seán Moylan

=== O ===
- Ruairí Ó Brádaigh
- Dáithí Ó Conaill
- Denis O'Brien
- Seamus O'Donovan
- Frank O'Connor
- Rory O'Connor
- Peadar O'Donnell
- Dan O'Donovan
- Fergal O'Hanlon
- Ernie O'Malley
- Michael O'Riordan

=== P ===
- Proinsias De Rossa

=== R ===
- Seán Russell
- P. J. Ruttledge
- Frank Ryan

=== S ===
- Seamus Robinson
- Seán South
- Austin Stack
- Jimmy Steele

=== T ===
- Oscar Traynor
- Moss Twomey
- Seamus Twomey

=== W ===
- Tom Williams

== Irish Republican Army: 1969-present ==
This list includes members of the Provisional IRA as well as subsequent splinter groups including the Continuity IRA and the Real IRA.

=== A ===
- Paddy Agnew (born 1955)
- Martina Anderson (born 1962)

=== B ===
- Thomas Begley (1970–1993), member of the Belfast Brigade; blew himself up in the Shankill Road bombing which killed nine other people.
- Ivor Bell
- Séanna Breathnach (born 1957)
- Charles Breslin (1964-1985), killed by undercover British Army members
- Rosena Brown (b. 1945), Belfast actress and IRA Intelligence Officer. Was named in 1990 murder trial of Maze prison officer John Hanna. Received a 20-year prison sentence in 1993 after a booby-trap bomb was found in her possession.

=== C ===
- Joe Cahill (1920-2004)
- Liam Campbell
- Fergal Caraher (1970-1990), killed by Royal Marines
- Malachy Carey, killed by Loyalists in late 1992
- Owen Carron (born 1953)
- Peter Cleary (1950-1976), shot dead by SAS
- Eamon Collins (1954-1999), became an informant in the late 1980s and was stabbed to death at his home in Northern Ireland
- Colombia Three (Niall Connolly, James Monaghan, Martin McCauley)
- Eddie Copeland
- Marion Coyle (born 1954), took part in the kidnapping of Dr. Tiede Herrema

=== D ===
- Seamus Daly
- Matt Devlin (1950-2005), took part in the 1981 IRA hunger strike and later became a leading member of the Sinn Féin party
- Kieran Doherty (1955-1981), died in the 1981 hunger strike after lasting 73 days
- Hugh Doherty
- Joe Doherty (born 1955)
- Martin Doherty (1958-1994), shot dead preventing a bombing by the Ulster Volunteer Force
- Pat Doherty (born 1945)
- Denis Donaldson (1950-2006), became an informant and was shot dead by the Real Irish Republican Army
- Rose Dugdale (born 1941)

=== E ===
- Dessie Ellis (born 1953)

=== F ===
- Mairéad Farrell (1957-1988), killed by SAS soldiers
- Hugh Feeney (born 1951)
- Martin Ferris (born 1952)
- Kieran Fleming (1959-1984), drowned
- William Fleming (1965-1984), killed by SAS soldiers
- Bernard Fox (born 1951)
- Kevin Fulton
- Angelo Fusco (born 1956)

=== G ===
- Michael Gaughan (1949-1974)
- Brian Gillen (born 1970)
- Raymond Gilmour (born 1959)
- John Francis Green (1946-1975), shot dead by Loyalists
- Dessie Grew (1953-1990), killed by undercover British Army members
- Seamus Grew (1951/52-1982), killed by Northern Ireland police officers

=== H ===
- Brendan Hughes (1948-2008), best known as the organiser and leader of the 1980 hunger strike
- Francis Hughes (1956-1981), died during the hunger strikes
- Sean Hughes
- Martin Hurson (1956-1981), died in the hunger strikes

=== K ===
- Brian Keenan (1942-2008)
- Gerry Kelly (born 1953)
- Sean Kelly (born 1972)

=== L ===
- Jim Lynagh (1956-1987), killed by SAS soldiers
- Martin Lynch

=== M ===
- Patrick Magee (born 1951)
- Paul Magee (born 1948)
- Donna Maguire (born 1967)
- Larry Marley (1946-1987), shot and killed by Loyalists
- Alex Maskey (born 1952)
- Proinsias MacAirt (1922-1992)
- Pearse McAuley (born 1965)
- Daniel McCann (1957-1988), killed by Special Branch officers in Belfast
- Martin McCaughey (1967-1990), shot dead by undercover British Army members
- Raymond McCreesh (1957-1981), died during the hunger strikes
- Joe McDonnell (1951-1981), died during the hunger strikes
- Séamus McElwaine (1960-1986), killed by SAS soldiers while his fellow IRA friend was severely injured
- Thomas McElwee (1957-1981), died during the hunger strikes
- Brendan McFarlane (born 1951)
- Martin McGartland (born 1970)
- Gerry McGeough (born 1958)
- Pat McGeown (1956-1996)
- Antoine Mac Giolla Bhrighde (1957-1984), killed by British Army troops
- Bernard McGinn (1957-2013)
- John Joe McGirl (1921-1988)
- Dominic McGlinchey (1954-1994), later became a leader of the INLA. Shot dead by unknown assailants.
- Kevin McGrady (born 1956)
- Martin McGuinness (1950-2017)
- Anthony McIntyre
- Pádraig McKearney (1954-1987), killed in an ambush by SAS soldiers
- Tommy McKearney (born 1952)
- Billy McKee
- Kevin McKenna Former Chief of Staff of the Provisional IRA
- Laurence McKeown (born 1956)
- Michael McKevitt (born 1949)
- Thomas McMahon (born 1948)
- Joseph MacManus (1970-1992), killed by Loyalists
- Jackie McMullan (born 1955)
- Danny McNamee (born 1960)
- Eoin McNamee
- Seán Mac Stíofáin (1928-2001)
- Michael McVerry (1949-1973), killed by British Army
- Martin Meehan (1945-2007)
- Arthur Morgan (born 1954)
- Danny Morrison (born 1953)
- Conor Murphy (born 1963)
- Thomas Murphy (born 1949)
- Michael Murray (1936-1999)
- Sean Murray

=== N ===
- Kieran Nugent (1958-2000)

=== O ===
- Ruairí Ó Brádaigh (1932-2013)
- Dáithí Ó Conaill (1938-1991)
- Phil O'Donnell (1932-1982)
- Éamonn O'Doherty (1939-1999)
- Sean O'Callaghan (born 1954)
- Siobhán O'Hanlon (1963-2006)
- Dessie O'Hare (born 1956)
- Diarmuid O'Neill (1969-1996), shot and killed by London Metropolitan Police officers

=== P ===
- Dolours Price (1951-2013)
- Marian Price (born 1954)

=== Q ===
- Liam Quinn (born 1949)
- Paddy Quinn (born 1962)
- Nessan Quinlivan (born 1965)

=== R ===
- Billy Reid (1939-1971), killed by British Army members

=== S ===
- Bobby Sands (1954–1981), a member of the Provisional IRA later elected as a Member of Parliament during the 1981 Irish Hunger Strike at Long Kesh.
- Seán Savage (1965–1988), a member of the Provisional IRA killed by members of the British Special Air Service (SAS) during Operation Flavius.
- Freddie Scappaticci (1946–2023), an alleged member of the Provisional IRA who is supposed to have acted as double agent under the alias Stakeknife.
- Frank Stagg (1948–1976), a member of the Provisional Irish Republican Army who participated in several hunger strikes after his imprisonment in 1973 and later died during a hunger strike at Wakefield Prison.
- Jimmy Steele (b. 1907–1970), fought during the Irish War of Independence as a member of the Fianna and remained active with the republican movement until his death in August 1970
- Bobby Storey, recruiter of the Provisional IRA in Belfast and suspected head of intelligence to the IRA Army Council.

=== T ===
- Matt Treacy, member of the Dublin Brigade, operating from inside Leinster House.
- Seamus Twomey (1911–1989), served twice as Chief of Staff for the Provisional IRA.
- Gerard Tuite (born 1955), senior IRA figure in the late 1970s/early 1980s.
