= Guerrilla phase of the Irish Civil War =

- Part of the Irish Civil War
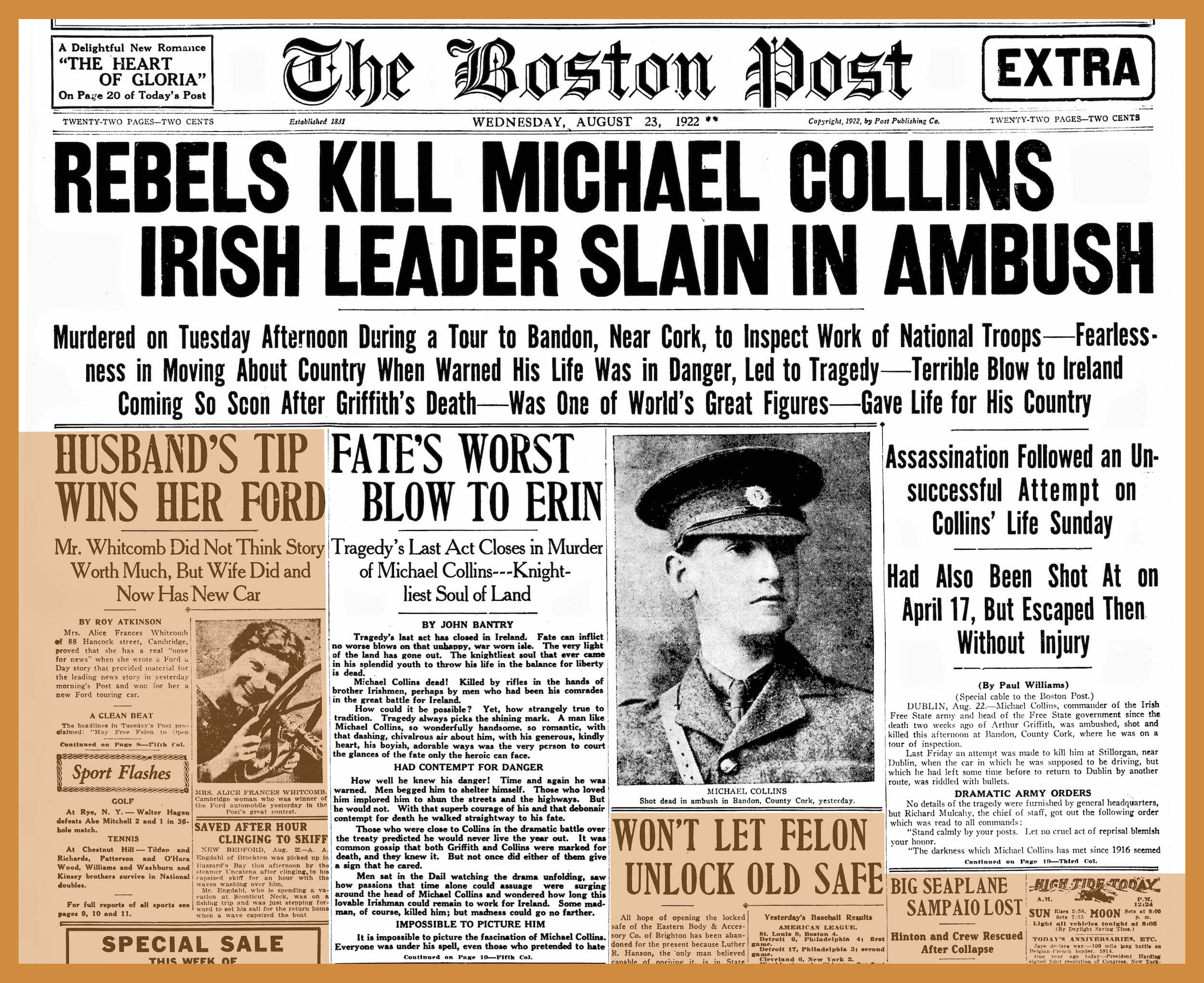
- Partial front page of a newspaper describing the death of Michael Collins on 22 August 1922.
Date	August 1922 – 24 May 1923
Location	Irish Free State
Result	Free State victory: End of the Irish Civil War

Belligerents
Irish Free State; Irish National Army; Irish Air Corps; Irish Navy; CID; Citizens' Defence Force	Anti-treaty IRA

Commanders and leaders
Michael Collins †; Richard Mulcahy	Liam Lynch †; Frank Aiken

Strength
Irish National Army: c. 55,000 soldiers and 3500 officers by end of the war; Irish Air Corps: 10 planes; Irish Navy: 1 ship; CID: 350	c. 15,000

Casualties and losses
Unknown	Unknown
- Civilians: Unknown

The guerrilla phase of the Irish Civil War began in August 1922, when the forces of the Irish Free State took all the fixed positions previously held by the Anti-Treaty IRA. The IRA then waged a guerrilla war to try to bring down the new Irish Government and overturn the Anglo-Irish Treaty. This guerrilla campaign was ultimately defeated.

The IRA called a ceasefire in April 1923 and "dumped arms" the following month. This phase of the war was characterised by small-scale military actions but also by assassinations and executions on both sides. The Free State also imprisoned up to 13,000 IRA fighters. In addition, the campaign saw the destruction of a great deal of infrastructure such as roads and railways by the IRA.

== Start of the guerrilla war ==
Government victories in the major towns inaugurated a period of guerrilla warfare. After the fall of Cork, Liam Lynch ordered Anti-Treaty IRA units to disperse and form flying columns as they had when fighting the British.

They held out in areas such as the western part of counties Cork and Kerry in the south, County Wexford in the east and counties Sligo and Mayo in the west. Sporadic fighting also took place around Dundalk, where Frank Aiken and the Fourth Northern Division of the Irish Republican Army were based and Dublin, where small scale but regular attacks were mounted on Free State troops.

Among the casualties of the guerrilla attacks was Commander-in-Chief Michael Collins, who was killed in an ambush at Béal na mBláth, while touring recently occupied territory in County Cork, on 22 August 1922. Arthur Griffith, the Free State president had also died of a brain hemorrhage ten days before, leaving the Free State government in the hands of W. T. Cosgrave and the Free State Army under the command of General Richard Mulcahy.

For a brief period, the onset of guerrilla warfare and the deaths of the two foremost leaders of the Provisional Government threw the Free State into crisis.

August and September 1922 saw widespread attacks on Free State forces in the territories they had occupied in the July–August offensive, inflicting heavy casualties on them. In this period, the republicans also managed several relatively large-scale attacks on rural towns, involving several hundred fighters. Dundalk, for example was taken by Frank Aiken's Anti-Treaty unit in a raid on 14 August, Kenmare in Kerry in a similar operation on 9 September and Clifden in Galway on 29 October. There were also unsuccessful assaults on for example Bantry, Cork on 30 August and Killorglin in Kerry on 30 September in which the Republicans took significant casualties.

However, as winter set in the republicans found it increasingly difficult to sustain their campaign and casualty rates among National Army troops dropped rapidly. For instance, in County Sligo, 54 people died in the conflict of whom all but 8 had been killed by the end of September.

In October 1922, Éamon de Valera and the anti-treaty Teachtaí Dála (TDs, Members of Parliament) set up their own "Republican government" in opposition to the Free State. However, by then the anti-treaty side held no significant territory and de Valera's "government" had no authority over the population. In any case, the IRA leaders paid no attention to it, seeing the Republican authority as vested in their own military leaders.

== The Free State gains the advantage ==
In the autumn and winter of 1922, Free State forces broke up many of the larger Republican guerrilla units.

In late September, for example, a sweep of northern County Sligo by Free State troops under Sean MacEoin successfully cornered the Anti-Treaty column which had been operating in the north of the county. Six of the column were killed and thirty captured, along with an armoured car. A similar sweep in Connemara in County Mayo in late November captured Anti-Treaty column commander Michael Kilroy and many of his fighters. December saw the capture of two separate Republican columns in the Meath/Kildare area.

Intelligence gathered by Free State forces also led to the capture on 5 August of over 100 Republican fighters in Dublin, who were attempting to destroy bridges leading into the city and on 4 November Ernie O'Malley, commander of Anti-Treaty forces in Dublin was captured when National Army troops discovered his safe house.

Elsewhere Anti-Treaty units were forced by lack of supplies and safe-houses to disperse into smaller groups, typically of nine to ten men.

An exception to this general rule was the activities of a column of Cork and Tipperary Anti-Treaty IRA fighters led by Tom Barry. In late December 1922, this group of around 100 men took a string of towns, first in Cork, then in Tipperary and finally Carrick-on-Suir, Thomastown and Mullinavat in County Kilkenny where the Free State troops surrendered and gave up their arms However, even Barry's force was not capable of holding any of the places it had taken and by January 1923 it had dispersed due to lack of food and supplies.

Despite these successes for the National Army, it took eight more months of intermittent warfare before the war was brought to an end.

== The war and the railways ==
By late 1922 and early 1923, the Anti Treaty guerrillas' campaign had been reduced largely to acts of sabotage and destruction of public infrastructure such as roads and railways. This had been an aspect of the Anti-Treaty campaign since August 1922, when Liam Lynch had issued general orders to this effect, "Owing to the use of railways by the Free State HQ for the conveyance of troops and war material and for the purposes of army communication, the destruction of the railways under Free State control is an essential part of our military policy". Not long afterwards the railway bridge at Mallow, linking Cork and Dublin, was blown up, severing rail communications between the cities.

Lynch re-emphasised the order on 29 December 1922, leading to a concerted assault on the railways early in the new year. In January 1923 the Great Southern and Western Railway released a report detailing the damage Anti-Treaty forces had caused to their property over the previous six months; 375 miles of line damaged, 42 engines derailed, 51 over-bridges and 207 under-bridges destroyed, 83 signal cabins and 13 other buildings destroyed. In the same month, Republicans destroyed the railway stations at Sligo, Ballybunnion and Listowel.

In response, the Free State set up an Army Railway Corps in October 1922, specifically to protect its rail lines. A massive programme of building fortified blockhouses around railway lines was undertaken and as a result, most lines were open again by April 1923 but the lines connecting Dublin with Cork and Kerry remained out of action until after the war.

While most of the attacks on the railways were assaults on property rather than people, in one case in Kerry, two railway workers were killed when republicans derailed their train.

== Atrocities and executions ==
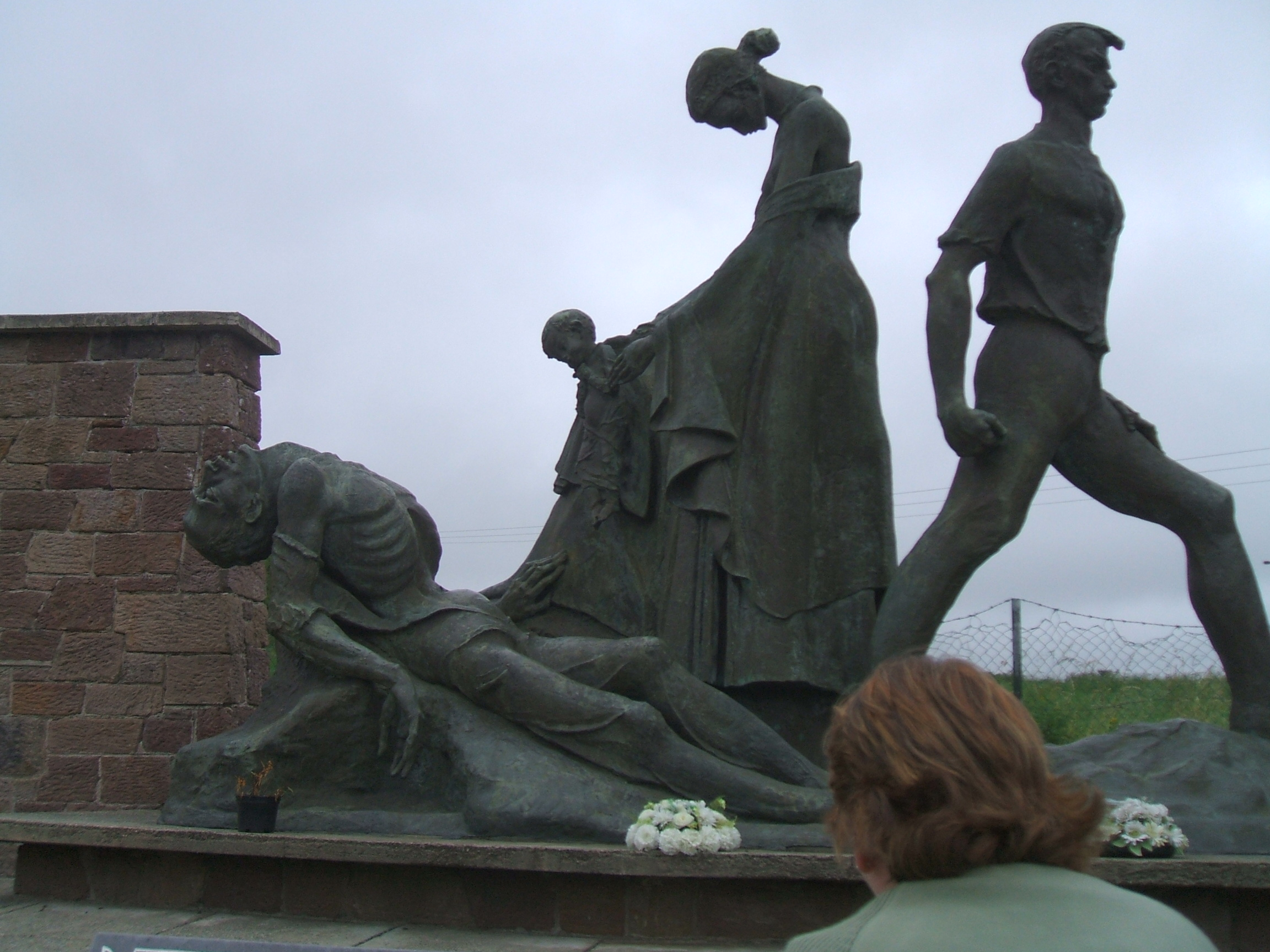
Memorial to the Republican soldiers executed by Free State forces at Ballyseedy, County Kerry, designed by Yann Goulet

The final phase of the Civil War degenerated into a series of atrocities that left a lasting legacy of bitterness in Irish politics. The Free State began executing Republican prisoners on 17 November 1922, when five IRA men were shot by firing squad. They were followed on 24 November by the execution of acclaimed author and treaty negotiator Erskine Childers. In all, the Free State sanctioned 77 official executions of anti-treaty prisoners during the Civil War.

The Anti-Treaty IRA in reprisal assassinated TD Seán Hales. On 7 December 1922, the day after Hales' killing, four prominent Republicans (one from each province), who had been held since the first week of the war—Rory O'Connor, Liam Mellows, Richard Barrett and Joe McKelvey—were executed in revenge for the killing of Hales.

In addition, Free State troops, particularly in County Kerry, where the guerrilla campaign was most bitter, began the summary execution of captured anti-treaty fighters. The most notorious example of this occurred at Ballyseedy, where nine Republican prisoners were tied to a landmine, which was detonated, killing eight and only leaving one, Stephen Fuller, who was blown clear by the blast, to escape.

The number of "unauthorised" executions of Republican prisoners during the war has been put as high as 153. Among the Republican reprisals were the assassination of Kevin O'Higgins' father and W. T. Cosgrave's uncle in February 1923.

It was also in this period that the Anti-Treaty IRA began burning the homes of Free State Senators and of many of the Anglo-Irish landed class. On 15 February 1923, Mansion of senator Brian Mahon in Ballymore Eustace, County Kildare was burned down by Anti-Treaty forces. In the remainder of the month, a total of 37 houses of senators were destroyed by the Anti-Treaty IRA. Their owners were mainly big landowners, descendants of the Protestant Ascendancy and many of them were unionists before Irish independence. Oliver St. John Gogarty was another prominent victim of house burnings. He also survived an assassination attempt in Dublin.

== End of the war ==
By early 1923, the offensive capability of the IRA had been seriously eroded and when, in February, Republican leader Liam Deasy was captured by Free State forces, he called on the Republicans to end their campaign and reach an accommodation with the Free State. The State's executions of Anti-Treaty prisoners, 34 of whom were shot in January, also took its toll on the Republicans' morale.

In addition, the National Army's operations in the field were slowly but steadily breaking up the remaining Republican concentrations. On 18 February, Anti-Treaty officer Dinny Lacey was killed and his column rounded up at the Glen of Aherlow in Tipperary. Lacey had been the head of the IRA's 2nd Southern Division and his death crippled the Republicans' cause in the Tipperary–Waterford area.

A meeting of the Anti-Treaty leadership on 26 February was told by their 1st Southern Division that, "in a short time we would not have a man left owing to the great number of arrests and casualties". The Cork units reported they had suffered 29 killed and an unknown number captured in recent actions and, "if five men are arrested in each area, we are finished."

March and April saw this progressive dismemberment of Republican forces continue with the capture and sometimes killing of guerrilla columns. Among the more well known of these incidents was the wiping out of an Anti-Treaty IRA column under Tim Lyons (known as "Aeroplane") in a cave near Kerry Head on 18 April. Three anti-treaty IRA men and two National Army soldiers were killed in the siege of the cave and the remaining five Republicans were taken prisoner and later executed. A National Army report of 11 April stated, "Events of the last few days point to the beginning of the end as a far as the irregular campaign is concerned."

=== Republicans "dump arms" ===
As the conflict petered out into a de facto victory for the pro-treaty side, Éamon de Valera asked the IRA leadership to call a ceasefire, but they refused. The IRA executive met on 26 March in County Tipperary to discuss the war's future. Tom Barry proposed a motion to end the war, but it was defeated by a vote of 6 to 5. De Valera was allowed to attend, after some debate, but was given no voting rights.

Liam Lynch, the intransigent Republican leader, was killed in a skirmish in the Knockmealdown mountains in County Tipperary on 10 April. The National Army had extracted information from Republican prisoners in Dublin that the IRA Executive was in the area and, in addition to killing Lynch, they also captured senior officers Dan Breen, Todd Andrews, Seán Gaynor, and Frank Barrett in the operation.

It is often suggested that the death of Lynch allowed the more pragmatic Frank Aiken, who took over as Chief of Staff, to call a halt to what seemed a futile struggle. Aiken's accession to leadership was followed on 30 April by the declaration of a ceasefire on behalf of the anti-treaty forces. On 24 May, Aiken issued an order to IRA volunteers to dump arms rather than surrender them or continue a fight which they were incapable of winning.

De Valera supported the order, issuing a statement to anti-treaty fighters on 24 May:

Soldiers of the Republic. Legion of the Rearguard: The Republic can no longer be defended successfully by your arms. Further sacrifice of life would now be in vain and the continuance of the struggle in arms unwise in the national interest and prejudicial to the future of our cause. Military victory must be allowed to rest for the moment with those who have destroyed the Republic.

Thousands of anti-treaty IRA members (including de Valera on 15 August) were arrested by Free State forces in the weeks and months after the end of the war, when they had dumped their arms and returned home.

== Conclusion ==
The guerrilla phase of the Civil War lasted roughly eight months. At first the Anti-Treaty, or republican, guerrillas were able to operate in large numbers and to mount relatively large-scale attacks. However their ability to do this was blunted by several factors – the onset of winter, the ongoing increase in size and competence of the National Army and their own lack of military and logistical supplies.

All of these weaknesses were compounded by a lack of widespread public support. Whereas against the British in 1919–1921, the IRA had been able to rely on the passive support, at least, of most of the population, this was no longer true when fighting a native Irish government. This was demonstrated in the elections immediately after the civil war, which Cumann na nGaedheal, the Free State party, won easily. (See 1923 Irish general election for the results.) They also faced hostility from the Press and the Catholic Church, which condemned their campaign as

a system of murder and assassination of the National forces without any legitimate authority ... the guerrilla warfare now being carried on [by] the Irregulars is without moral sanction and therefore the killing of National soldiers is murder before God, the seizing of public and private property is robbery, the breaking of roads, bridges and railways is criminal. All who in contravention of this teaching, participate in such crimes are guilty of grievous sins and may not be absolved in Confession nor admitted to the Holy Communion if they persist in such evil courses.

As the war dragged on, the Republicans' capacity to undertake large-scale military operations became more and more restricted. A great deal of their activities were devoted to destruction of government property and infrastructure. At the same time, the cycle of executions and reprisals that marked the guerrilla war meant that it left far more bitterness among the combatants than the conventional phase of the war.

Although the war ended with the defeat of the Anti-Treaty side, there was no negotiated peace. The remaining Republican guerrillas simply hid their arms and went home. This failure to end the war conclusively – either by military means or negotiation – meant that the Anti-Treaty IRA and its successors never fully accepted the 1922 Treaty settlement. This factor contributed to further campaigns by the IRA in the 1940s, 50s and later in the Troubles in Northern Ireland.

== Sources ==
- Andrews, Todd, Dublin Made Me
- Coogan, Tim Pat, De Valera
- Doyle, Tom The Civil War in Kerry, Mercier 2008
- Farry, Michael, The Aftermath of Revolution, Sligo 1921-23
- Hachey, Thomas E., The Irish Experience, A Concise History
- Hopkinson Michael, Green Against Green, The Irish Civil War
- Meda Ryan, Tom Barry, IRA Freedom Fighter, Mercier 2003
- Meath History, 1922-1958
- Executions in County Kildare
- History of the Third Tipperary Brigade
