= Bill Gannon (Irish republican) =

Irish Republican Army (1902-1965)

- Gannon in 1954

Personal details
- Born: 23 June 1902
- Died: 12 September 1965 (aged 63)
- Party: Communist Party of Ireland

Military service
- Allegiance: Irish Republic
- Branch/service: Irish Republican Army; Anti-Treaty IRA
- Battles/wars: Irish War of Independence; Irish Civil War

Bill Gannon (23 June 1902 – 12 September 1965) was a well-known militant of the Irish Republican Army (IRA) and later a leading member of the Communist Party of Ireland.

== IRA career and the O'Higgins Assassination ==
Gannon had fought in the Irish War of Independence. In the Irish Civil War he took the anti-treaty side and was among the force which seized the Four Courts in Dublin.

After the defeat of his side he spent a considerable time under internment together with numerous others. He was completely unreconciled to the victory of the "Free Staters", and together with two fellow-detainees – Archie Doyle and Timothy Coughlin – took part in forming a secret "vengeance grouping". The three vowed that once free of imprisonment they would take revenge on their opponents, whom they considered traitors to the Irish cause.

Most such private revenge pacts were broken up by the IRA leadership when it reorganised following 1924, but Gannon and his two fellow conspirators persisted and carried through their deadly aim. The act which first made Gannon (and the two others) well-known was the assassination of Justice Minister Kevin O'Higgins. On Sunday 10 July 1927, the three surprised O'Higgins on the Booterstown Avenue side of Cross Avenue in Blackrock, County Dublin and shot him down.

O'Higgins was especially hated by IRA members for having ordered the executions of seventy-seven of their fellows during the Civil War, an act for which he outspokenly took responsibility and refused to express any remorse. On 8 December 1922 O'Higgins signed off on the retaliatory executions of four senior republicans (Liam Mellows, Richard Barrett, Joe McKelvey and Rory O'Connor) for the killing of a member of Dáil Éireann. Moreover, he was a dominant member of the Free State government and the conspirators had good reasons to believe that his death would weaken it.

None of the three was ever apprehended or charged with the assassination, though Coughlin was killed by a police informer in 1928 under circumstances which remain controversial up to the present. Gannon and Doyle benefited from the amnesty for IRA members issued by Éamon de Valera on his accession to power in 1932, and after that date they could openly admit their part in assassinating O'Higgins without fear of being prosecuted.

== Communist career and the Spanish Civil War ==
By that time, Gannon had already turned to the Left and became a leading member of the Communist Party of Ireland when it was refounded in 1933. In this decision may have been influenced by Donal O'Reilly, his lifelong companion who had been with him at the Four Courts and who already joined the Communist Party in its earlier incarnation under Roddy Connolly. The radical left-wing commentator Jack Cleary approvingly mentions Bill Gannon as among the few IRA militants who had "given up the gun in favor of working-class politics" (in marked contrast to Gannon's aforementioned fellow-assassin Archie Doyle, who continued to take part in IRA armed raids well into the 1940s).

Being an Irish Communist in these years carried, however, its own risks. Gannon is mentioned as having been among the defenders of Connolly House, the party's Dublin headquarters, when it was attacked – and ultimately put on fire – by a right-wing mob in 1933. And in subsequent years Communists continued to suffer constant harassment, often descending into outright violence.

Gannon is at present mainly remembered for his major part in organising Irish volunteers (the Connolly Column) to fight on the Republican side in the Spanish Civil War, a work undertaken in close co-operation with Frank Ryan and Peadar O'Donnell, and which came to overshadow his earlier fame (or notoriety) in connection with the O'Higgins assassination.

Gannon died on 12 September 1965, age 63, and got a well-attended party funeral, his coffin being draped with a red flag and the Irish Tricolor flag.
