= Robert Byrne =

Robert Byrne may refer to:

== Robert Byrne ==
- Robert Byrne (Australian politician) (1821–1909), politician in Victoria, Australia
- Robert Byrne (author) (1930–2016), sports author, novelist
- Robert Byrne (bishop) (born 1956), British Roman Catholic bishop
- Robert Byrne (chess player) (1928–2013), American chess player
- Robert Byrne (hurler) (born 1997), Irish hurler
- Robert Byrne (North Dakota politician) (1886–1967), North Dakota Republican politician
- Robert Byrne (songwriter) (1954–2005), American songwriter
- Robert Byrne (trade unionist) (1899–1919), Irish trade unionist

== Bobby Byrne ==
- Bobby Byrne (baseball) (1884–1964), third baseman in Major League Baseball
- Bobby Byrne (cinematographer) (1932–2017), American cinematographer
- Bobby Byrne (musician) (1918–2006), trombonist
- John Edgar Byrne, known as "Bobby Byrne", Australian journalist.

== See also ==
- Bob Byrne, comics writer, artist, and publisher
