= Archie Doyle =

Irish Republican Army (1903 – 1980)

Archie Doyle (29 September 1903 – 1980) was one of three anti-Treaty members of the Irish Republican Army (1922–1969) (IRA) who on 10 July 1927 assassinated the Irish Justice Minister Kevin O'Higgins. He had had a long subsequent career in the organisation's ranks.

== War of Independence ==
Doyle fought in the Irish War of Independence and took the anti-treaty side in the Irish Civil War, and was subsequently interned among numerous others. Together with two fellow-detainees – Timothy Coughlin and Bill Gannon – he took part in forming a secret "vengeance grouping". The three vowed that once free of imprisonment they would take revenge on their opponents, whom they considered traitors to the Irish cause.

== O'Higgins murder ==
Most such private revenge pacts were broken up by the IRA leadership when it reorganised following 1924, but Doyle and his two fellow conspirators persisted and carried through their deadly aim. On 10 July 1927, the three surprised O'Higgins on his way to Mass at the Booterstown Avenue side of Cross Avenue in Blackrock, County Dublin and shot him down. (By one version, as he lay dying O'Higgins begged forgiveness from his killers).

O'Higgins was especially hated by IRA members for having ordered the executions of seventy-seven of their fellows during the Civil War, an act for which he outspokenly took responsibility and refused to express any remorse. On 8 December 1922 O'Higgins signed off on the retaliatory executions of four senior republicans (Liam Mellows, Richard Barrett, Joe McKelvey and Rory O'Connor) for the killing of a member of Dáil Éireann. Moreover, he was a dominant member of the Free State government and the conspirators had good reasons to believe that his death would weaken it.

== Aftermath ==
The three made their escape and were not apprehended. However, Timothy Coughlin was shot to death by police informer Sean Harling on the night of 28 January 1928, on Dublin's Dartry Road, under circumstances which remain controversial up to the present. A second IRA man is known to have been with Coughlin that night, in surveillance of Harling's home, and to have escaped unharmed. It is believed that Doyle was that second man, though this point – as many other details of this still rather mysterious affair – remains not quite certain.

Doyle (as well as Gannon who died in 1965) was among the beneficiaries of the amnesty issued by Éamon de Valera when he came to power in 1932, under which numerous IRA men were released from prison and the charges against others dropped. In later times Doyle openly admitted his part in the killing of O'Higgins, and indeed took pride in it, without fear of prosecution.

== Split with de Valera and the 1940s campaign ==
With the end of the IRA's alliance with de Valera and the increasing confrontation between them, Doyle – now a veteran highly respected in the IRA circles – became deeply involved in the organisation's 1940s campaigns. "Harry", the memoirs of IRA man Harry White, make repeated admiring references to "Archie Doyle of Dublin, the Tan War veteran who had fought through it all".

During the IRA's Northern Campaign, Doyle is said to have participated in the abortive raid on the British barracks at Crossmaglen, County Armagh, on 2 September 1942, in retaliation for the execution of Tom Williams earlier that morning. The IRA unit – some twenty men in a commandeered lorry and accompanying car – was discovered by a passing RUC patrol near the village of Cullaville. Doyle is mentioned in White's memoirs as having "jumped out of the car, Thompson in hand, and started shooting at the RUC". (Since the element of surprise was lost, the attack on the barracks had to be cancelled.)

A week later, on 9 September, White mentions Archie Doyle as having commanded the assassination of Sergeant Denis O'Brien, Irish Special Branch detective and himself a former IRA man, near Dublin. It was a highly controversial affair, opposed by the IRA GHQ in Belfast as damaging to the Northern Campaign, and precipitating a massive manhunt by the Irish police. It was IRA Chief of Staff Charlie Kerins who was two years later caught, charged with the O'Brien assassination and eventually executed for it. White, however, claims that it was Doyle who actually commanded that action, on Kerins's orders. (Doyle, who openly spoke of his part in killing O'Higgins, seemed far more reticent about this part of his career).

In 1943 Doyle was assigned as the IRA's Quartermaster General in Belfast.

On 1 July 1943 Doyle is mentioned as having participated, together with Kerins and with Jackie Griffith – both of them much younger men, who were only born when Doyle was already a full-fledged fighter against the British – in an operation of "fund-raising" for the hard-pressed IRA (i.e., robbery). The three men arrived on bikes at the gates of Player Wills factory on the South Circular Road, Dublin, and with scarves around their faces stopped at gunpoint a van loaded with some £5,000 for wages, and drove away with the van and the money.

== Later life ==
Griffith was shot down by the police in Dublin less than a week later, in what was charged to be an extrajudicial assassination, and Kerins – as mentioned – was caught in 1944 and executed, becoming a major IRA martyr. Doyle, however, continually survived decades of a very dangerous way of life and managed to die of old age. He died in St. James's Hospital in 1980.

In April 1987, the Irish Nationalist "New Hibernia" magazine noted: "(...)Joe McGrath and Jack O'Sheehan are dead; Archie Doyle went – though not before telling us how they had shot Kevin O' Higgins".
