= Timothy Coughlin =

Irish Republican Army (1906-1928)

Timothy Coughlan (1906–1928) was a volunteer F Coy, 4th Battalion, Dublin Brigade ASU in the Irish Republican Army, mainly known for his part in assassinating Kevin O'Higgins in 1927 and for the controversy surrounding the circumstances of his death in 1928.

== Early life ==
The second-eldest in a family of nine, Coughlan lived with his parents in the family home in Inchicore, Dublin. While only in his teens during the Irish War of Independence, he took up arms against the Black and Tans and later against the Free State forces in the Irish Civil War.

== Assassination of Kevin O'Higgins ==
As a known member of the Dublin Brigade of the IRA, he was interned by the "Free Staters" during the Civil War, but if anything became even more active and determined to continue the fighting though his side had lost the war. Together with two fellow detainees - Archie Doyle and Bill Gannon - he took part in forming a secret "vengeance grouping". The three vowed that once free of imprisonment they would take revenge on their opponents, whom they considered traitors to the Irish cause.

Most such private revenge pacts were broken up by the IRA leadership when it was reorganised following 1924, but Coughlan and his two fellow conspirators persisted and carried through their deadly aim. On 10 July 1927, the three surprised Justice Minister Kevin O'Higgins on his way to Mass at the Booterstown Avenue side of Cross Avenue in Blackrock, County Dublin and shot him down. (By one version, as he lay dying O'Higgins declared his forgiveness of his killers.)

O'Higgins was especially hated by IRA members for having ordered the executions of seventy-seven of their fellows during the Civil War, an act for which he outspokenly took responsibility and refused to express any remorse. On 8 December 1922 O'Higgins signed off on the retaliatory executions of four senior republicans (Liam Mellows, Richard Barrett, Joe McKelvey and Rory O'Connor) for the killing of a member of Dáil Éireann. Moreover, he was a dominant member of the Free State government and the conspirators had good reasons to believe that his death would weaken it.

== Death ==
Coughlan and his companions managed to escape after assassinating Kevin O'Higgins. However, he was killed six months later, on the evening of 28 January 1928, in circumstances which remain controversial up to the present. On that day he and another IRA volunteer, who may have been Archie Doyle, were on Dublin's Dartry Road, opposite 'Woodpark Lodge', at the time the home of Seán Harling - a former IRA member who was an undercover police agent.

Harling later claimed that upon his arrival home, he noticed Coughlan and Doyle, that one of them shot at him, that he pulled his gun while running and shot back in self-defence, and that later he went out to investigate and found Coughlan's body lying in the street. His version was accepted by the tribunal which looked into the case, and he was not charged.

However, the IRA claimed at the time - and many Irish nationalists continue to claim up to the present - that Coughlan was in fact ambushed and in effect extrajudicially executed. This version is especially supported by the autopsy carried out by Dr. Wilfred Lane which "amongst other anomalies, discovered that the IRA man died as a result of being shot in the back of his head". Also, the doctor found a cigarette butt in his mouth, which again indicated he had been caught unaware and killed, and tenants on Dartry Road testified that there had been unusual police activity that evening and that they heard more shots than mentioned in Harling's account.

The Dublin IRA Brigade admitted that it did intend to murder Harling, who had betrayed IRA weapons dumps to the government and who - using his former Republican credentials - was agitating among IRA supporters and calling for "a change in the IRA leadership", allegedly on orders from his government "controller" David Neligan.

However, the IRA claimed that Coughlan and Doyle had been engaged in preliminary surveillance only, and had no intention to attack Harling that evening. This is supported by the fact that, even according to Harling's version, they did not open fire until he noticed them - even though they were in place, at a location overlooking his house, before he arrived.

Whatever the truth of the matter, in the wake of this affair Harling - feeling in danger of his life - asked and got the help of the Irish Free State in departing for America. He later returned to Ireland and joined the civil service.
