= Clondulane =

Village in County Cork, Ireland

Clondulane Cluain Dalláin
- Village
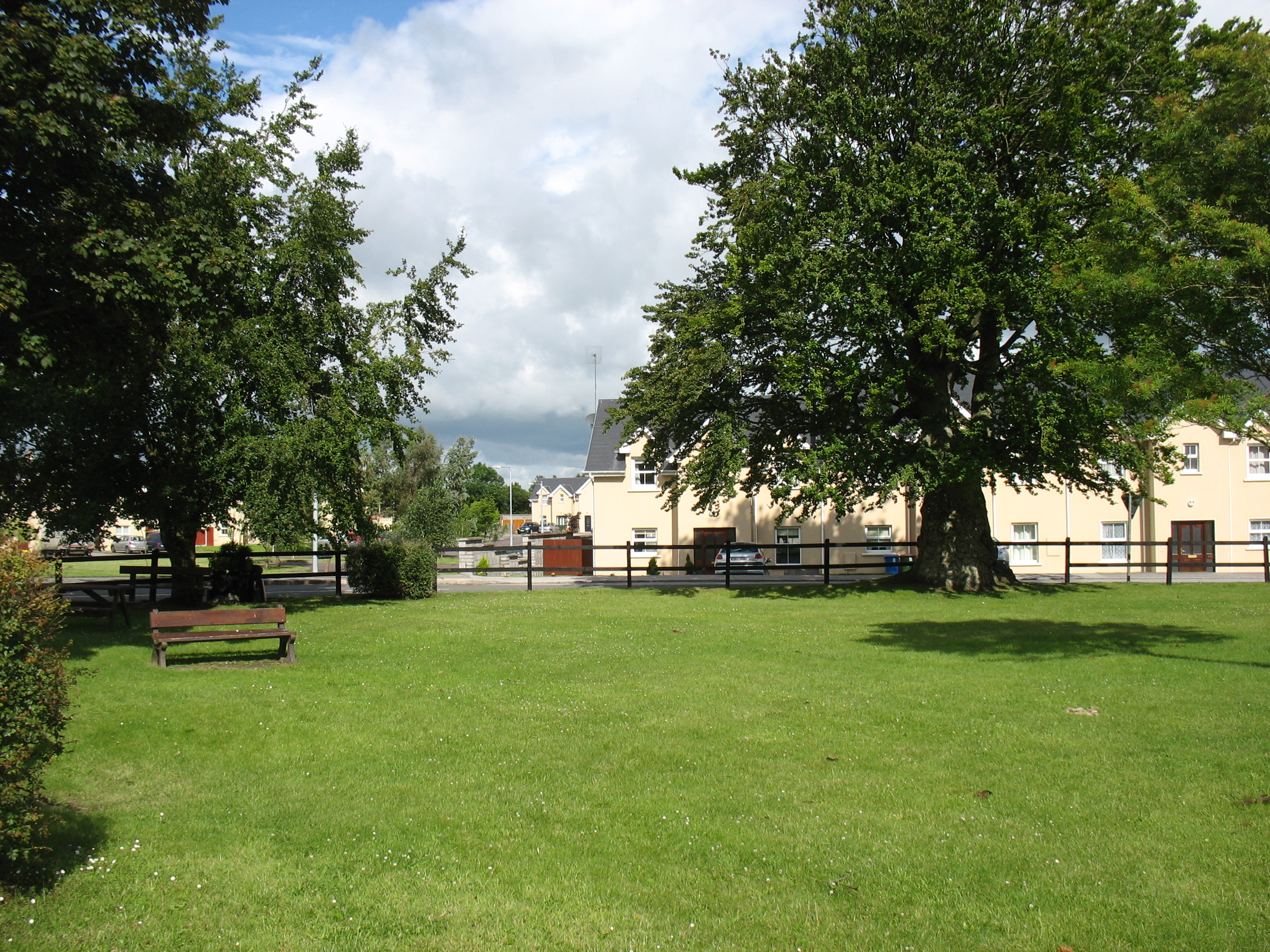
- Clondulane village green

- Location
- Coordinates: 52°08′33″N 08°13′24″W
- Country: Ireland
- Province: Munster
- County: County Cork

Population (2022)
  - Total: 470
- Time zone: UTC+0 (WET)
  - Summer (DST): UTC-1 (IST (WEST))

Clondulane (Irish: Cluain Dalláin) is a village and civil parish in north County Cork, Ireland. The village is about 4 mi (6 km) east of Fermoy, just off the main Fermoy-Dungarvan road. Originally built as a camp for the workers of a Cork Milling Company grain mill, it now has a population of over 400. Clondulane is part of the Cork East Dáil constituency.

There are three large houses of note in the village: Clondulane, Glandulane, and Careysville Houses, the latter being owned by the Duke of Devonshire (England) and used as a lodging house during the salmon season. Along with several housing estates and many stand alone dwellings, there is a school, community centre, public house, playing fields, park, disused railway station, factory, a Protestant school, Protestant church and graveyard.

== Transport ==
Clondulane railway station opened on 27 September 1872, and closed on 27 March 1967. It was located on the now dismantled Waterford to Mallow line and served by the Rosslare to Cork boat train.

== People ==
- Moss Twomey (1897–1978), Irish republican and chief of staff of the Irish Republican Army.

== See also ==
- List of towns and villages in Ireland
