= Moss Twomey =

Irish republican (1897–1978)

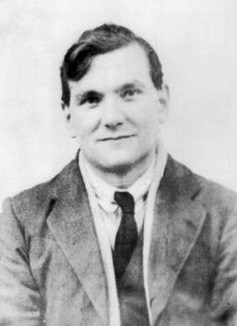

Chief of Staff of the IRA
- In office 1926 – June 1936
- Preceded by: Andrew Cooney
- Succeeded by: Seán MacBride

Personal details
- Born: Maurice Twomey; 10 June 1897 Clondulane, near Fermoy, County Cork, Ireland
- Died: 1 October 1978 (aged 81)

Military service
- Branch/service: Original IRA; Anti-Treaty IRA
- Rank: Chief of Staff (Anti-Treaty IRA)
- Battles/wars: Irish War of Independence; Irish Civil War

Maurice Twomey (10 June 1897 – October 1978) was an Irish republican and the longest serving chief of staff of the Irish Republican Army (IRA).

== Early life ==
Twomey was born in 1897 in Clondulane, near Fermoy, County Cork, Ireland and was educated by the Congregation of Christian Brothers. The son of a labourer at Hallinan's flour mill in the town, Twomey went to work there at the age of 14 where he rose to the position of works manager. In 1914 he became active in the Irish Volunteers.

== Character ==
Twomey was a dedicated and well respected Irish Republican who successfully dealt with factions within the Irish Republican movement. "He was dedicated to Irish freedom and nothing else mattered to him. Compromise was not in his vocabulary." Twomey maintained a strong faith in Roman Catholicism.

== War of Independence ==
By 1918 he was adjutant of the Fermoy Battalion and a year later became an adjutant of the Cork No. 2 Brigade. He took part in an ambush of British troops in Fermoy in September 1919, one of the first attacks on British soldiers in Ireland since the 1916 Easter Rising and one of the first of the Irish War of Independence.

During 1920 he helped direct IRA intelligence in his brigade area. He was staff commandant of Liam Lynch's 1st Southern Division when he was captured and imprisoned on Spike Island during 1921. He managed to escape from the prison by rowing boat along with Dick Barrett, Tom Crofts and Bill Quirke.

== Civil War ==
Twomey opposed the Anglo-Irish Treaty of December 1921 and was critical of the tactics adopted by the anti-Treaty forces - the occupation of the principal seat of justice in Ireland the Four Courts. He was influenced by Oscar Traynor's opinion that an attack by the newly formed Irish National Army to end the occupation of the Four Courts would destroy the Republic. The subsequent destruction of the Four Courts showed government leadership that it was out of touch with the level of opposition to the treaty and also the awesome power of artillery. Twomey concurred with Liam Mellows that if a government was to be formed in the interest of labour, it must be a republic.

During the Irish Civil War, Twomey became adjutant general on the staff of Liam Lynch (the IRA Chief of Staff), and was with Lynch when he was killed in the Knockmealdowns mountains on 10 April 1923. Twomey was imprisoned that same month in Dublin along with Tom Derrig.

== IRA Chief of Staff ==
During 1924 he became involved in the reorganisation of the IRA, inspecting its southern divisions that summer and its northern units during 1925. First elected onto the IRA Executive at the November 1925 IRA General Army Convention, he became a full-time IRA activist. He was the editor and regular contributor to the newly established Irish republican weekly newspaper, An Phoblacht. During 1926 he was acting IRA chief of staff in the absence of Andrew Cooney, and in 1927, he was confirmed in that position and held it until May 1936.

In the summer of 1925, the anti-treaty IRA had sent a delegation led by Pa Murray to the Soviet Union for a personal meeting with Joseph Stalin, in the hopes of gaining Soviet finance and weaponry assistance. A secret pact was agreed where the IRA would spy on the United States and the United Kingdom and pass information to Red Army military intelligence (GRU) spymasters in New York City and London in return for £500 a month. The pact was originally approved by Frank Aiken, who left soon after, before being succeeded by Cooney and Twomey who kept up the secret espionage relationship.

Twomey was not himself an ideological Marxist-Leninist (though there were some communists in the IRA at this time such as Peadar O'Donnell), he saw the arrangement purely as a means to gain the IRA badly needed funding. Twomey also repeatedly accused the Soviets of being "shifty" and "out to exploit us." Nevertheless, London-based IRA spymaster Seán MacBride passed specifications of "submarine detection sonar and aeroplane engines for bombers, military journals and manuals, and gas masks" to the USSR through Berlin-based GRU operative Walter Krivitsky, whom ciphered IRA communications referred to only by the code name "James". Meanwhile, the IRA's main spymaster in America "Mr. Jones", whom historians Tom Mahon and James J. Gillogly have identified as Daniel "Sandow" O'Donovan, passed "reports of the army’s chemical weapons service, state-of-the-art gas masks, machine-gun and aeroplane engine specifications, and reports from the navy, air service and army" to the Soviet GRU.

Twomey was considered a Socialist, albeit one who put practicality before ideology. Twomey considered himself a moderate, had a deep sense of history, and the belief that Ireland had the resources to provide a good living for all of its people. His policy as chief of staff was to allow individual members of the IRA to join left-wing groups, but not to let the IRA itself become attached to any political party. He simultaneously feared undermining support for Fianna Fáil and thus handing power back to Cumann na nGaedheal; but he was also apprehensive about the IRA being seen as attached to Fianna Fáil.

In 1930, Twomey married Kathleen MacLaughlin of Donegal and had two children in the early 1930s.

=== Saor Eire and Fianna Fáil ===
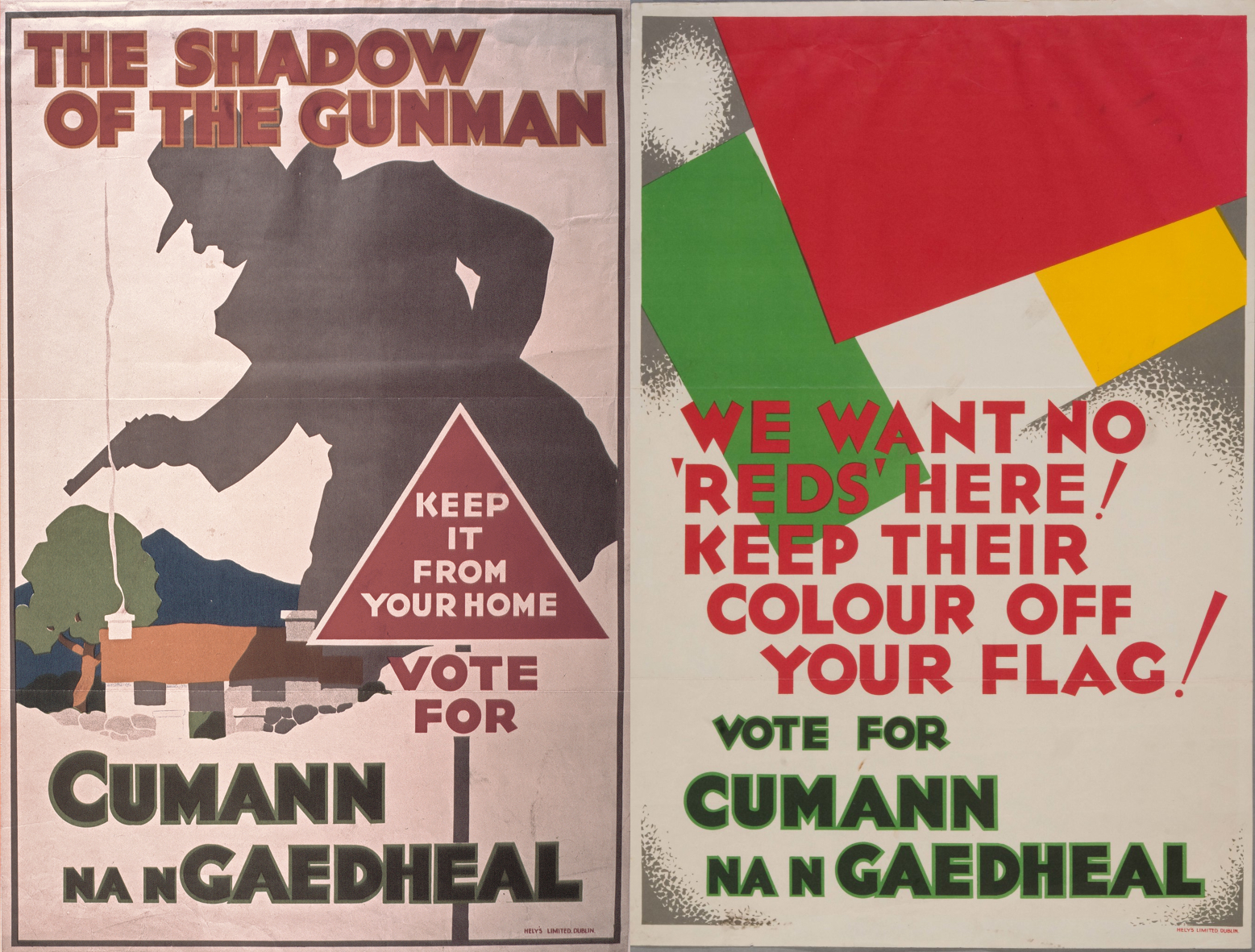
During the 1932 election Cumann na nGaedheal attempted to use red scare tactics by linking Fianna Fáil to the IRA, and the IRA to Stalinism.

Twomey had the qualities and skills of diplomacy when dealing with the various factions of the Republican movement. In 1931 Twomey tried to quell different factions within the IRA (those seeking to establish a social programme vs those against it) by permitting IRA members to create Saor Eire, a far-left political party. However, Saor Eire quickly found itself under attack from both Cumann na nGaedheal and by the Catholic Church in Ireland for being a Pro-Soviet organisation, with the IRA painted as guilty by association. Simultaneously, the Cumann na nGaedhael government gave itself emergency powers and began arresting IRA members. Both Twomey and the IRA decided that in order to hold off Cumann na nGaedheal, they would need to rally around Fianna Fáil.

In February 1932, Cumann na nGaedhael called an early election, hoping to catch both the IRA and Fianna Fáil on the backfoot. However, Fianna Fáil were able to secure victory. To the surprise of many, Cumann na nGaedhael chose to respect the result of the vote and stood aside to let Fianna Fáil into power. Initially, many Republicans and members of the IRA were overjoyed with the result. At first Fianna Fáil seem to signal goodwill to the IRA by releasing many IRA prisoners. However, it quickly dawned upon the IRA that Fianna Fáil were not going to declare a Republic, and this put them in an awkward spot. A week after Fianna Fáil came to power, an internal document produced by the IRA leadership asked two fundamental questions: "can Fianna Fáil’s methods and policies achieve the Republic?", to which they answered No, and "can the IRA launch a successful revolution against the Fianna Fáil Government?", to which they also answered No. Both Twomey and the IRA were unsure how to proceed. In Twomey's own words "nobody had visualised a Free State which Republicans were not supposed to attack".

Following the election of Fianna Fáil, Tom Barry and Twomey clashed over the direction going forward. Barry wished to see Saor Eire ended (believing its policies never gain mass support, and in fact, this made Saor Eire an undemocratic concept) and for the IRA to reconcile with Fianna Fáil. Twomey instead thought that the social programme of Saor Eire could and would gain democratic support.

On 21 May 1936 Twomey was arrested in his house in Dublin under Article 2A of the Irish Constitution. On 18 June 1936 the Fianna Fáil government banned the IRA. The following day Twomey was tried and jailed for three years for membership of the newly proscribed organisation. Under the IRA constitution, his tenure as IRA chief of staff ended automatically upon his arrest. He was imprisoned in Arbour Hill Prison and the Curragh from 1936 to 1938. During his period of imprisonment his family depended heavily on money sent to them by Joseph McGarrity of Clan na Gael, a US-based IRA fundraising organisation. On his release, Twomey became adjutant general on Seán Russell's army council. He travelled to Britain with IRA leader Jack McNeela and inspected the IRA's units there that were planning the 1939-40 sabotage and bombing campaign - the S-Plan. Twomey concluded that the IRA was in no position to launch a campaign and withdrew from IRA activity. In 1939 he opened a newsagents and confectioners in Dublin's O'Connell Street.

== Post IRA life ==
Following a crackdown on the IRA by Éamon de Valera's government, he was interned for two weeks during 1940. He remained close to the IRA, giving assistance to republicans deported from Britain and mediating in disputes between IRA factions. While he did not take an active role in politics after the 1940s, he did speak at a number of republican commemorations, most notably at the restoration of Wolfe Tone's grave at Bodenstown in 1971. He never claimed an IRA pension from the Irish government or gave an account of his record to the Bureau of Military History which had been set up to record the recollections of participants involved in the struggle against British rule.

He was badly injured in an accident in 1971 and was deeply affected by the death of his wife Kathleen Twomey in April 1978. Twomey himself died in October of that year. The presence at his funeral of members of Fianna Fáil and Fine Gael, Sinn Féin The Workers' Party and Provisional Sinn Féin, the Irish labour movement and old IRA comrades from the 1930s was evidence of his enduring popularity. He was buried in Glasnevin Cemetery, Dublin.

Twomey's papers from his period as IRA chief of staff, consisting of 28 boxes, are now kept at the Archives Department of University College Dublin.
