= Liam Lynch (Irish republican) =

Irish republican (1892–1923)

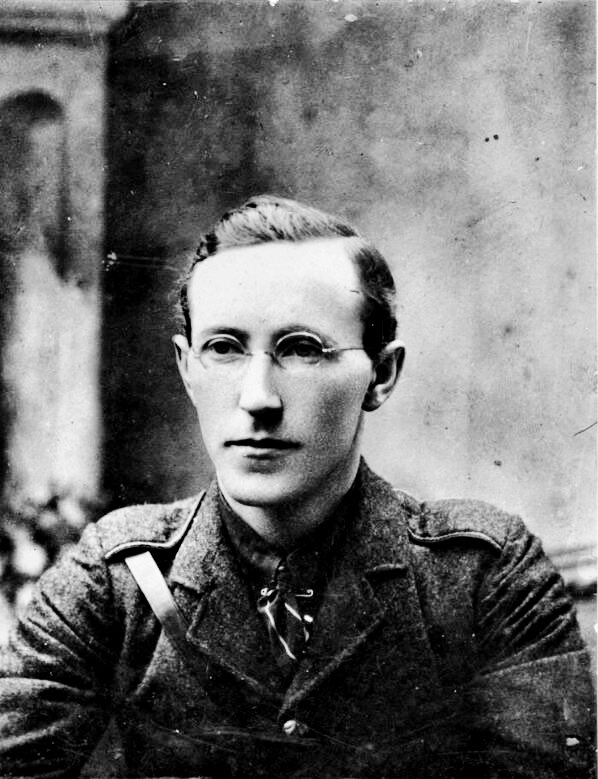
- Lynch in 1920

Chief of Staff of the Irish Republican Army
- In office 26 March 1922 – 10 April 1923
- Succeeded by: Frank Aiken

Personal details
- Born: 20 November 1892 Baurnagurrahy, County Limerick, Ireland
- Died: 10 April 1923 (aged 30) Clonmel, County Tipperary, Ireland

Military service
- Allegiance: Irish Republic
- Branch/service: Irish Republican Army
- Years of service: 1917–1923
- Rank: General
- Commands: Officer Commanding, 2nd Cork Brigade, Irish Republican Army, 1919 – April 1921; Commander, First Southern Division, Irish Republican Army, April 1921 – March 1922; Chief of Staff, Irish Republican Army, March 1922 – April 1923
- Battles/wars: Irish War of Independence; Irish Civil War †

William Fanaghan Lynch (Irish: Liam Ó Loingsigh; 20 November 1892 – 10 April 1923) was an Irish Republican Army officer during the Irish War of Independence of 1919–1921. During much of the Irish Civil War, he was chief of staff of the Irish Republican Army. On 10 April 1923, Lynch was killed whilst trying to escape an encirclement by Free State troops in south Tipperary.

== Early life ==
Lynch was born in the townland of Baurnagurrahy, Anglesboro, County Limerick, near Mitchelstown, County Cork, on 20 November 1892. His father was Jeremiah Lynch and his mother was Mary Lynch (née Kelly), both of whom are buried in Brigown graveyard, Mitchelstown. During his first twelve years of schooling he attended Anglesboro National School. Lynch was living with his parents in Baurnagurrahy for the 1901 and 1911 censuses.

In 1909, at the age of 17, he started an apprenticeship in O'Neill's hardware shop in Mitchelstown, where he joined the Gaelic League and the Ancient Order of Hibernians. Later he worked at J. Barry & Sons, Hardware Merchants Fermoy. In the aftermath of the 1916 Easter Rising, he witnessed David and Thomas Kent of Bawnard House being taken through Fermoy after their arrest by the Royal Irish Constabulary. After this, he determined to dedicate his life to Irish republicanism. In 1917 he was elected First Lieutenant of the Irish Volunteer Company, based in Fermoy.

== War of Independence ==
In Cork, Lynch reorganised the Irish Volunteers—the paramilitary organisation that became the Irish Republican Army (IRA)—in 1919, becoming commandant of the Cork No. 2 Brigade of the IRA during the guerrilla Anglo-Irish War. In June 1920, he helped capture Brigadier-general Cuthbert Lucas, wounding a British colonel named Danford during the incident. Lucas later escaped while being held by IRA men in County Clare. Lynch was captured, together with the other officers of the Cork No. 2 Brigade, in a British raid on Cork City Hall in August 1920.

Terence McSwiney, Lord Mayor of Cork, was among those captured; he later died on hunger strike in protest at his detention. Lynch, however, gave a false name and was released three days later. He then began to organise a flying column within his IRA brigade to launch attacks on British targets. Having "made himself a leader out of force of his own convictions ... possessed by a sense of mission and by revolutionary ardour", Lynch believed independence could only be "hewed" by the British.

In September 1920, Lynch, along with Ernie O'Malley, commanded a force that raided the British Army barracks at Mallow, County Cork, killing a sergeant of the 17th Lancers. The arms in the barracks were seized and the building was partially burnt. In response to the raid and other IRA activity in County Cork, British authorities increased their counterinsurgency operations in the county, resulting in a pattern of ambushes and counter-ambushes. The IRA's Mallow Battalion suffered heavy casualties in February 1921 and Lynch narrowly escaped from a firefight at the village of Nad on March 1921 that killed 4 IRA volunteers.

Between March and April 1921, the IRA was reorganised into divisions based on regions, and Lynch was made commander of the 1st Southern Division. From April 1921 until the truce that ended the war in July 1921, Lynch was put under increasing pressure by the deployment of more British forces into the area and their use of small mobile units to counter IRA guerrilla tactics. Lynch was no longer in command of the Cork No. 2 Brigade, for he had to travel in secret to each of the nine IRA brigades in Munster. By the time the truce went into effect, Lynch's volunteers were increasingly hard-pressed by the British and short of arms and ammunition. He therefore welcomed the truce as a respite but expected the war to continue after it ended.

== Treaty and truce period ==
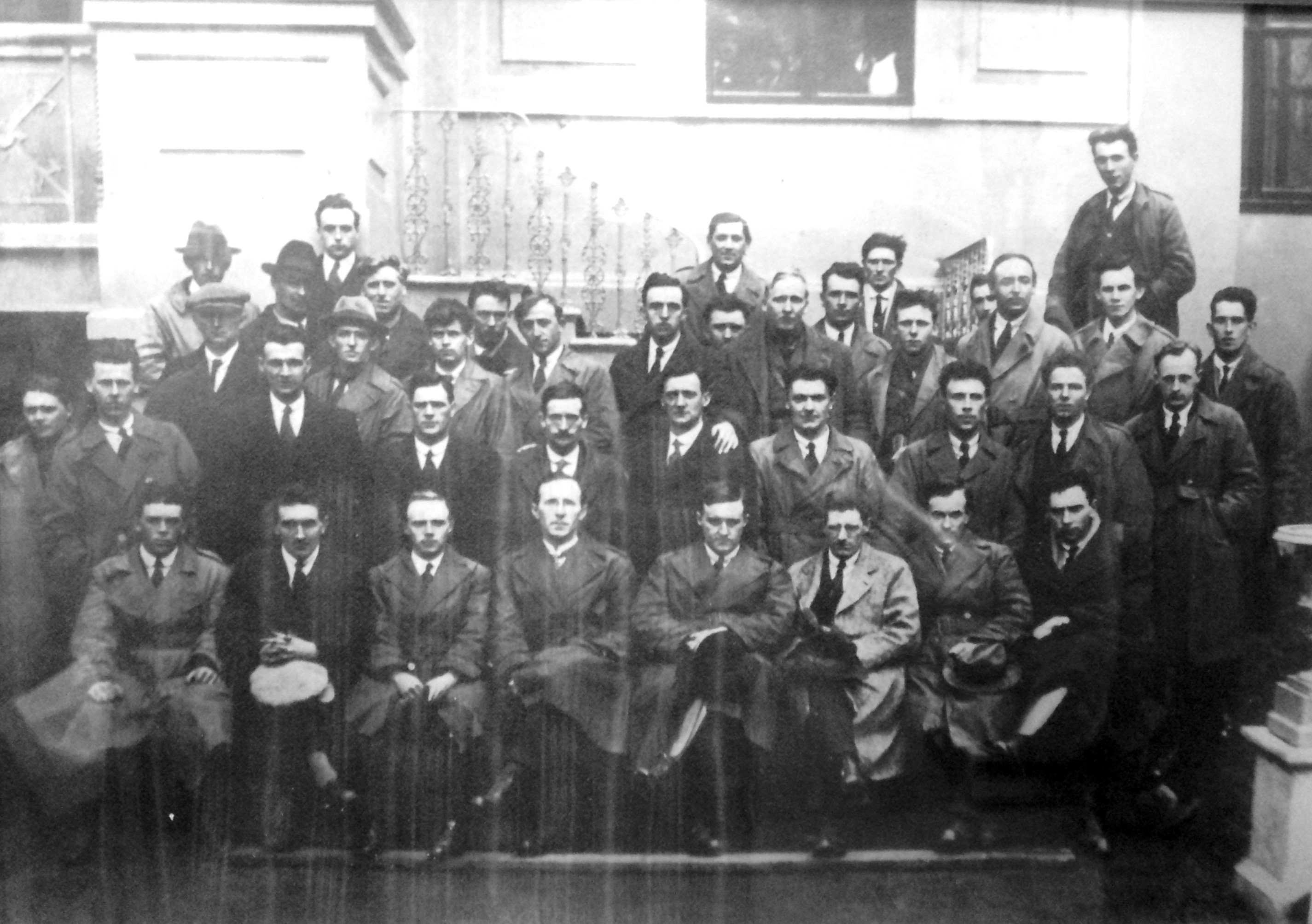
Lynch with some of his divisional staff and officers of the brigades, including the 1st Southern Division, who attended as delegates to the Anti-Treaty Army Convention at the Mansion House, Dublin, on 9 April 1922.

The War of Independence ended formally with the signing of the Anglo-Irish Treaty between the Irish negotiating team and the British government in December 1921. Lynch was opposed to the Treaty, on the grounds that it disestablished the Irish Republic proclaimed in 1916 in favour of dominion status for Ireland within the British Empire.

Lynch, however, did not want a split in the republican movement and hoped to reach a compromise with those who supported the Treaty ("Free Staters") by the publication of a republican constitution for the new Irish Free State. In Lynch's "adherence to the idea of a republic the practicalities of politics made little impact on his consciousness and he was dismissive of the popular support for the treaty." Lynch did his best to reunite a divided IRA and continued to hold discussions with the opposing side for a number of months. Both he and Michael Collins were on the IRB Supreme Council and neither wanted to see a civil war.

Lynch, who commanded by far the largest area of any divisional commander, was elected temporary chief of staff by the Republican Military Council in March. His appointment as chief of staff of the anti-treaty forces was confirmed on 9 April by the Executive appointed at the army convention of 26 March.

He did not participate in the seizure of the Four Courts in Dublin by a group of hardline republicans in April 1922. However, at the Third Army Convention on 18 June, following the defeat of a proposal he opposed — to restart hostilities with the British — a diehard faction broke away from his leadership and set up a new GHQ at the Four Courts. Lynch remained recognised as IRA chief of staff by a majority of republicans.

This rift had been healed by the time the Four Courts garrison was attacked by the newly formed National Army on 28 June, which marked the beginning of the Irish Civil War. On 27 June, Lynch and Liam Deasy had met with McKelvey and Mellows in the Four Courts. The result was a reunification of the two IRA groupings with Lynch as chief of staff. (Note: The date of 27 June given by Deasy and O'Connor is slightly at variance with the 29 June recorded by O'Malley (Ernie O'Malley et al. (2007), "No Surrender Here!" The Civil War Papers of Ernie O'Malley 1922–1924 (Dublin, Lilliput Press), p. 32). However, as Deasy's account refers to the Four Courts bombardment starting the next morning (28 June), it may be more reliable)

== Civil War ==
On 28 June, Free State forces arrested his party, including Deasy, but Free State general Eoin O'Duffy allowed them to leave the city. Later it was stopped by a Free State patrol in County Kilkenny and spent some time with enemy officers. A Free State publication stated that Lynch had been released on the understanding that he disavowed the approach of the 'Irregulars'. O'Duffy was adamant that Lynch had assured him that he would not take up arms against the government. For his part, Lynch issued a vehement denial of any such undertaking having been given, in which regard he was supported by Florrie O'Donoghue and Deasy.

Lynch now began organising resistance elsewhere. On 1 July 1922 IRA forces occupied portions of Limerick city. At this time Lynch also sent a note to the leader of the Free State forces to discuss the possibility of a truce.

Lynch wished to establish a "Munster Republic", which he believed would frustrate the creation of the Free State. This "Munster Republic" would be defended by the "Waterford-Limerick Line". From south-east to north-west, this consisted of the city of Waterford, the towns of Carrick-on-Suir, Clonmel, Fethard, Cashel, Golden, and Tipperary, and ended at the city of Limerick, where Lynch established his headquarters. He led Limerick's defence, but it fell to Free State troops on 20 July 1922.

He retreated further south and set up his new headquarters at Fermoy. The "Munster Republic" collapsed in August, when Free State troops landed by sea in Cork and Kerry. Cork City was taken on 8 August and Lynch abandoned Fermoy on 11 August 1922. The Anti-Treaty forces then dispersed and pursued guerrilla tactics. His counterpart Michael Collins was killed in an ambush at Béal na mBláth, Cork on 22 August, a week after the death of Arthur Griffith.

Lynch contributed to the growing bitterness of the war by issuing what were known as the "orders of frightfulness" against the Provisional Government on 30 November 1922. This general order sanctioned the killing of Free State TDs (members of parliament) and senators, as well as certain judges and newspaper editors, in reprisal for the Free State's killing of captured republicans. The first republican prisoners to be put to death were four captured IRA men on 14 November 1922, followed by the execution of republican leader Erskine Childers on 17 November.

These orders were acted upon by IRA men, who killed TD Seán Hales and wounded another TD outside the Dáil on 7 December 1922. In response, the Free State shot four republican leaders, Rory O'Connor, Liam Mellows, Dick Barrett and Joe McKelvey the next day. This led to a cycle of atrocities on both sides, including the Free State official execution of 77 republican prisoners and "unofficial" killing of roughly 150 other captured republicans. In early February 1923 Lynch issued a notice that the IRA would begin reprisals if the executions of prisoners continued. Lynch's men, for their part, launched a concerted campaign against the homes of Free State members of parliament.

Among the acts they carried out were the burning of the house of TD Seán McGarry, resulting in the death of his seven-year-old son, the murder of Free State minister Kevin O'Higgins' elderly father and the burning of the O'Higgins' family homestead at Stradbally in early 1923. Lynch wrote to Éamon de Valera that "Free State supporters are traitors and deserve the latter's stark fate".

Lynch was heavily criticised by some republicans, notably O'Malley, for his failure to coordinate their war effort and for letting the conflict peter out into inconclusive and defensive guerrilla warfare. Other IRA volunteers felt that while Lynch was a decent man, he had failed to organise and lead the anti-treaty forces properly and did not possess the mind-set of a revolutionary to strike early for a swift victory.

Lynch was scathing of the Dáil and the old IRA GHQ for having abandoned the people in the North, "particularly in Belfast" (see The Troubles in Ulster (1920–1922)).

In March 1923, the Anti-Treaty IRA Army Executive met in a remote location in the Nire Valley. Several members of the executive proposed ending the civil war; however, Lynch opposed them and narrowly carried a 6–5 vote to continue the war. He had been trying to import mountain artillery from Germany in a vain attempt to turn the tide of the war. When killed, he was carrying documents that appeared to call for the end of the war.

== Death ==
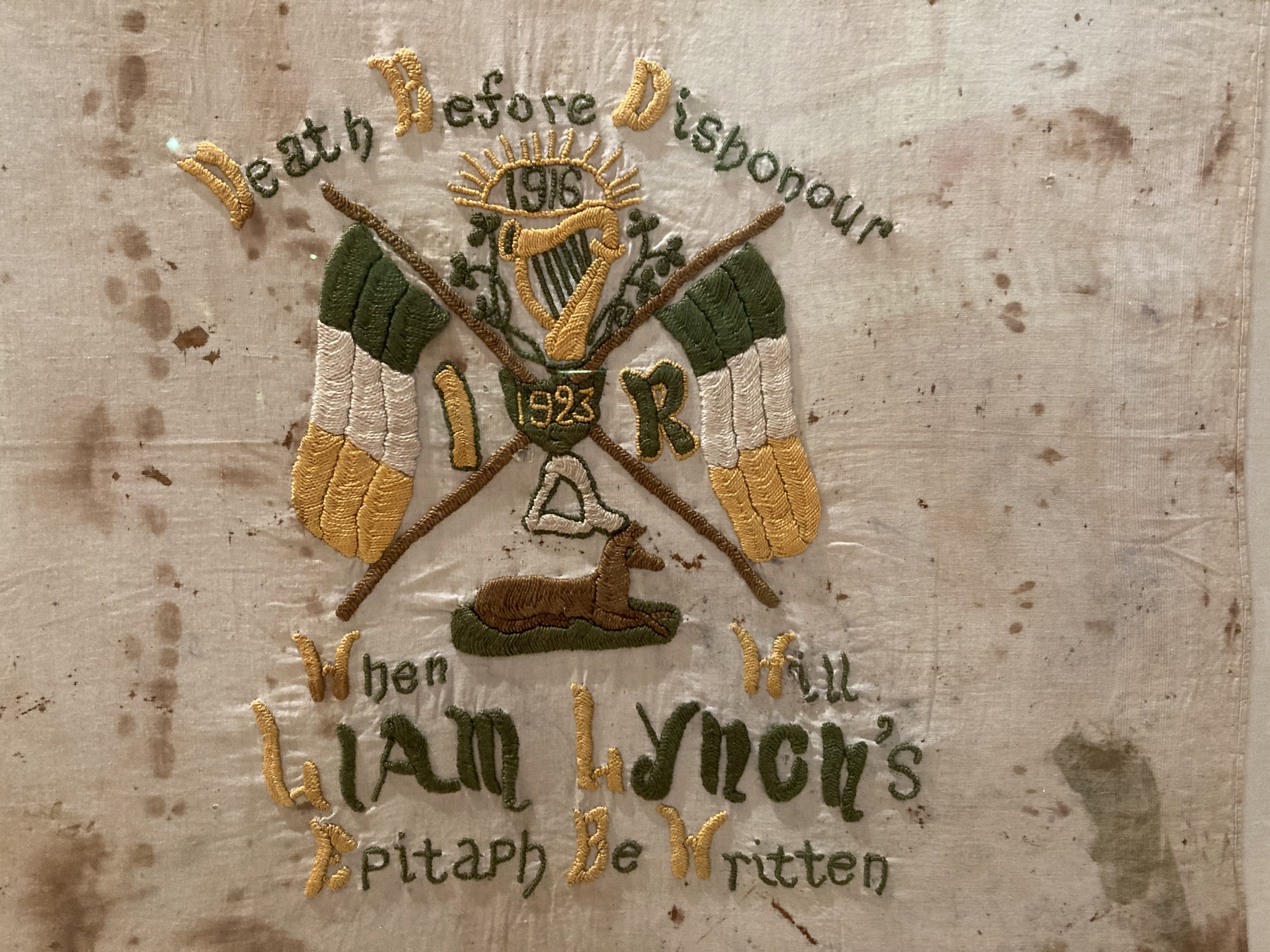
Bloodstained handkerchief belonging to Lynch at the time of his death (Tipperary Museum of Hidden History); a Cumann na mBan member embroidered the message on it, alluding to Robert Emmet's famous speech from the dock.

On 10 April 1923, a National Army unit was seen approaching Lynch's secret headquarters in the Knockmealdown Mountains. Lynch was in possession of important papers that he knew could not fall into enemy hands, so he and his six comrades attempted to evade them. To their shock, they ran into another unit of 50 National Army soldiers approaching from the opposite direction. Lynch was shortly afterwards hit by rifle fire from the road at the foot of the hill. Knowing the value of the papers they carried, he ordered his men, including soon-to-be chief of staff Frank Aiken, to leave him behind. When the National Army soldiers reached Lynch they initially believed him to be Éamon de Valera, but he informed them – "I am Liam Lynch, Chief-of-Staff of the Irish Republican Army. Get me a priest and doctor. I'm dying." His last wish was to be buried next to his comrade, Michael Fitzgerald. In late 1920, Fitzgerald had died after a 67-day hunger strike. Lynch was carried on an improvised stretcher manufactured from guns to Nugent's (formally Walsh's) pub in Newcastle at the foot of the mountains and was later brought to the hospital in Clonmel, where he died that evening at 9 pm. He was buried two days later at Kilcrumper Cemetery, near Fermoy, County Cork.

== Legacy ==
According to historian Tom Mahon, the Irish Civil War was "effectively ended" by the shot that killed Liam Lynch. Twenty days later, his successor, Frank Aiken, gave the order to cease military operations.

On 7 April 1935, 12 years later, the Fianna Fáil Government of Éamon de Valera erected a 60-foot-high (18 m) round tower monument on the spot (52°15′6.43″N 7°51′26.16″W) where Lynch was thought to have fallen in the Knockmealdown Mountains.

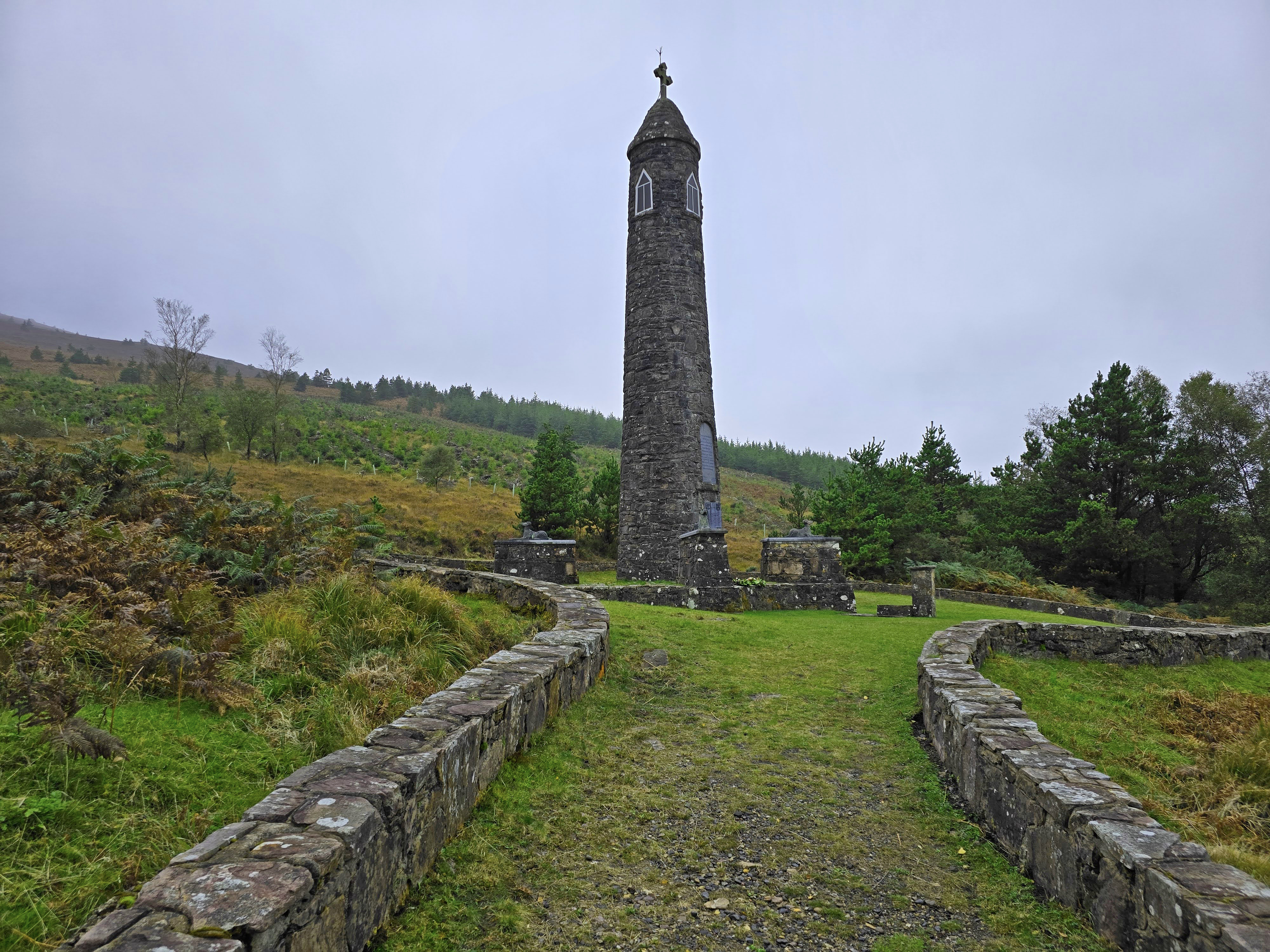
The Liam Lynch Monument styled like an Irish round tower with four bronze wolfhounds set on limestone slabs on rubble sandstone pedestals around it

The Irish Defence Forces barracks at Kilworth, County Cork, was named Lynch Camp in his honour in 1966.

The bloodied tunic worn by Lynch on the day he was shot is on permanent display at the National Museum at Collins Barracks in Dublin. The Good Friday Agreement, which ended The Troubles in Northern Ireland, was signed on 10 April 1998, the 75th anniversary of Lynch's death.

Lynch is mentioned in the Irish folk ballad "Soldiers of '22" , along with Cathal Brugha, Dinny Lacey and Neil Plunkett Boyle. The song, its writer unknown, to the tune of The Foggy Dew, recalls Lynch's death "Brave Liam Lynch on the mountainside fell a victim to the foe".

== Sources ==
- Hopkinson, M., Green against Green, the Irish Civil War (Dublin, 1988)
- Walsh, P.V., The Irish Civil War 1922–23 – A Study of the Conventional Phase
- Ryan, Meda, The Real Chief: The Story of Liam Lynch (Cork, 1986)
- O'Donoghue, Florence, No Other Law: The Story of Liam Lynch and the Irish Republican Army, 1916–1923 (Dublin, 1954 and 1986)
- O'Farrell, P., Who's Who in the Irish War of Independence & Civil War
- Borgonovo, J., The Battle for Cork, July–August 1922
