= Sean Hughes (Irish republican) =

Farmer and senior member of the Irish Republican Army

Seán Gerard Hughes is a farmer from Dromintee, County Armagh, Northern Ireland, who has been named as a former member of the Irish Republican Army (IRA) Army Council.

Describing him as a "hardliner" in the Republican movement, The Sunday Times reported that Hughes had served on the IRA's general headquarters staff (GHQ) as operations officer, but left in 2002 when appointed to the Army Council. Speaking under Parliamentary privilege in the British House of Commons, Member of Parliament for Belfast East, Peter Robinson, named Hughes as a member of the Army Council. In 2005 The Sunday Times reported Hughes had resigned his position "after losing interest in the peacetime IRA."

In 2001 Hughes was charged on counts of false accounting and obtaining by deception. He filed an application under human rights legislation, claiming he could not receive a fair trial in Northern Ireland after his picture, identified as an IRA member, was included in a book by Toby Harnden. The application was rejected, but the case was moved to Belfast Crown Court where Hughes was convicted of benefit fraud.

Hughes and several associates subsequently had their assets frozen by the Serious Organised Crime Agency.
