= Andrew Cooney (Irish republican) =

Irish republican (1897–1968)

Chief of Staff of the IRA
- In office 1925–1926
- Preceded by: Frank Aiken
- Succeeded by: Moss Twomey

Personal details
- Born: 22 April 1897 Nenagh, County Tipperary
- Died: 4 August 1968 (aged 71) Carroll County, Maryland

Military service
- Branch/service: Irish Republican Army; Anti-Treaty IRA
- Battles/wars: Irish War of Independence; Irish Civil War

Andrew Cooney (22 April 1897 – 4 August 1968) was an Irish republican from Nenagh, County Tipperary, who later settled in the United States. He studied medicine at University College Dublin just as the Irish War of Independence was getting underway, and he played for a brief spell with the college's hurling club. He joined the Third Battalion of the Dublin Brigade of the Irish Republican Army (IRA) eventually being named Chief of Staff.

== Biography ==
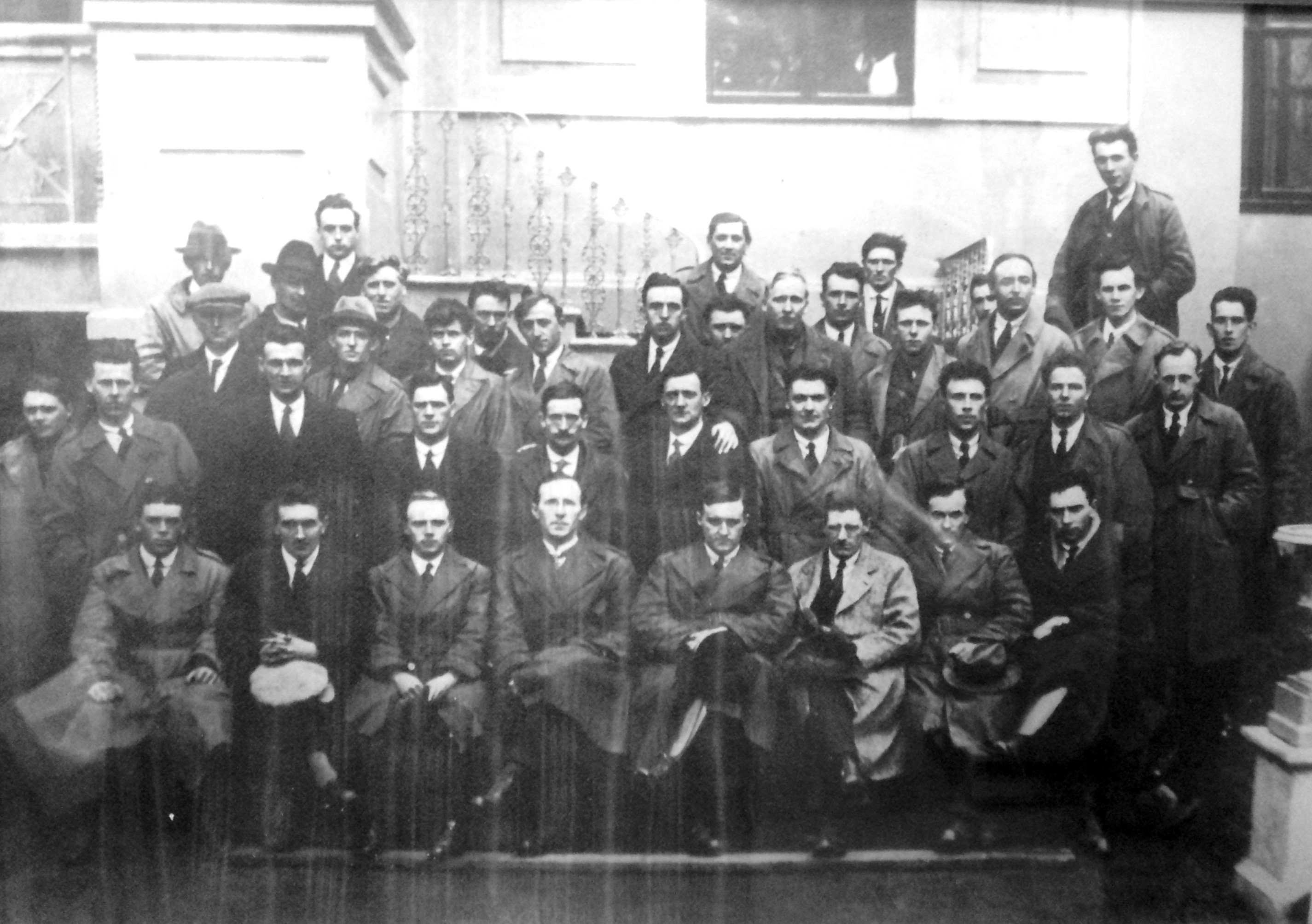
Liam Lynch with some of his Divisional Staff and Officers of the Brigades including the 1st Southern Division who attended as delegates to the Army Convention at the Mansion House, Dublin on 9 April 1922. Cooney is first on the right in the 3rd row back.

On 21 November 1920 (Bloody Sunday (1920)) Cooney was one of the Volunteers who shot six British Army Intelligence officers (three were killed) at 28 Upper Pembroke Street, Dublin. After the Anglo-Irish truce of July 1921, Cooney was appointed Officer Commanding (O/C) of the 1st Kerry Brigade, IRA, and reorganised it. He opposed the Anglo-Irish Treaty of 1921 and in March 1922 was appointed Commandant of the 1st Eastern Division of the anti-Treaty IRA in the Irish Civil War.

The same year he was captured by Free State forces and interned in Mountjoy Prison, where he became O/C of the prisoners in C Wing. He accepted responsibility for an attempted escape bid on 10 October 1922 in which a fellow prisoner Peadar Breslin was killed and another man was wounded. He was released in 1924. He succeeded Frank Aiken as Chief of Staff of the IRA in 1925; after eight months in that role, he departed on a fund-raising trip to the United States, but soon returned. Cooney won his only Fitzgibbon Medal with UCD in 1927. His service for the UCD team ended when he qualified as a medical doctor in 1928.

In 1933, Cooney unveiled a memorial to Terence Bellew McManus at the old Republican plot in Glasnevin Cemetery, Dublin. Thereafter, semi-retired from active republicanism, he continued to be a regular orator at gatherings, and he was a founder of the short-lived Cumann Poblachta na hÉireann party in 1936. Cooney emigrated to the United States in the 1940s; he died on 4 August 1968 at Carroll County General Hospital, Carroll County, Maryland, at age 71. Andy Cooney is buried in his native land at Neenagh, Co. Tipperary.
