= Edward Dorins =

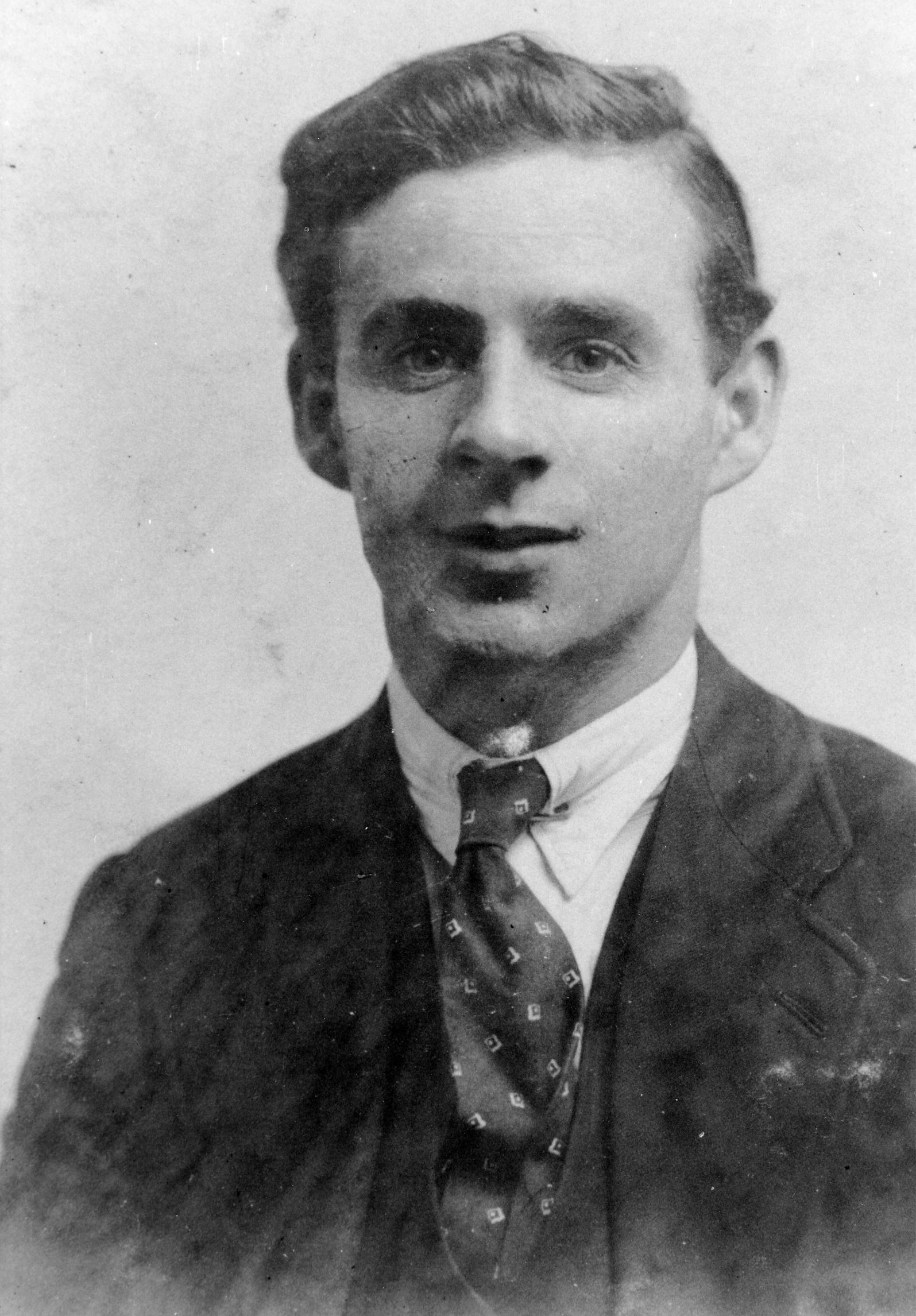
Edward Dorins, IRA Volunteer

Edward Christopher Dorins (1898–1921) (Irish: Éamonn Críostóir Ó Dubhruis) was a member of the IRA who was killed by British forces during the Irish War of Independence.

Dorins was born at 40, Patrick Street, Kingstown (now Dún Laoghaire) on the first of January, 1898. He was the third of eight brothers, only four of whom survived to adulthood: Cornelius, Patrick, Edward and Michael. His father, Thomas Dorins, was a railway worker who came from Lettermacaward in the Donegal Gaeltacht and his mother was Mary Ellen Travers of Kingstown. (There is some doubt about the surname - Thomas's name on his own 1864 birth certificate was given as Thomas Doris, son of Condy Doris and Catherine Melly, and many of his relatives who moved to Scotland were known as Dorans. However, all the branches of the family preserve the tradition that the name was originally Doris or Ó Dubhruis, a Tyrone-Fermanagh surname). Thomas and Mary Ellen were married in Greenock, Renfrewshire in 1892. Both of them were working in Scotland at the time. Edward was influenced politically by his mother's family, who were quite radical - several of his aunts were members of Cumann na mBan and according to a family story, his grandfather Patrick Travers, a sailor from Castlehaven in County Cork, was disciplined in the Navy when a Fenian ballad sheet was found in his sea chest. Edward's father Thomas had little interest in politics, though his sympathies lay more with Fianna Fáil than Fine Gael.

After Mary Ellen Dorins died in 1908, the family moved to 145, Church Road in the Fairview area of North Dublin and his father remarried. This placed him in what was later to be the recruitment area of the Second Battalion of the Dublin Brigade of the IRA. Edward became a plumber in the shipyards after leaving school. His brother Patrick died of tuberculosis in 1918. Michael left Ireland in 1922 and travelled all over the world as a sailor. He is believed to have died in one of the Atlantic convoys during the Second World War. Cornelius joined the Canadian Army in 1914 and was wounded at Ypres. He worked in the oil industry and disappeared in Texas in 1938.

It is not known when Edward became involved in Republican activities but he and his brother Patrick attended the funeral of Thomas Ashe in Dublin in the autumn of 1917. The Dorins's house was raided by Auxiliaries in February 1921 and he was beaten up and thrown into the Liffey at the Grattan Bridge. He was shot at in the water and eventually managed to climb out of the river at the Butt Bridge. He was treated at Jervis Street Hospital for a week and then had to leave that hospital quickly because of a tip-off that it was to be raided in a search for wounded Republicans. The incident was widely reported in Ireland at the time in the Freeman's Journal and in the Irish Independent. Thomas Griffiths, Labour M.P. for Pontypool, asked Hamar Greenwood about his ill-treatment at the hands of the Auxiliaries in the House of Commons. (See Hansard: HC Deb 3 March 1921 vol 138 cc1977-84.) Greenwood's reply was treated with jeers from the opposition.

Edward Dorins was shot dead during the Battle of the Custom House on 25th. of May, 1921, when the offices of the Local Government Board in Dublin were destroyed, an action which, though disastrous for the Dublin Brigade, is believed to have led directly to the truce and to the independence of the Irish Free State. At the time of his death, Edward Dorins was an NCO (a sergeant) in E Company, Second Battalion, Dublin Brigade of the IRA. He was killed while attacking a tender full of Auxiliaries in Beresford Place along with Volunteer Daniel Head. In some of the newspaper reports of the time he is called Tommy, which was a nickname. He is buried in the family plot in Deansgrange Cemetery in Dublin.

His name is wrongly recorded as Dorrens on the Custom House memorial. In the 1950s, there was a proposal to rename some of the streets in the area around the Custom House after those who died. Custom House Quay was to be renamed Dorrins Quay, but this plan was not accepted.
