= Robert Byrne (trade unionist) =

Irish republican and trade unionist

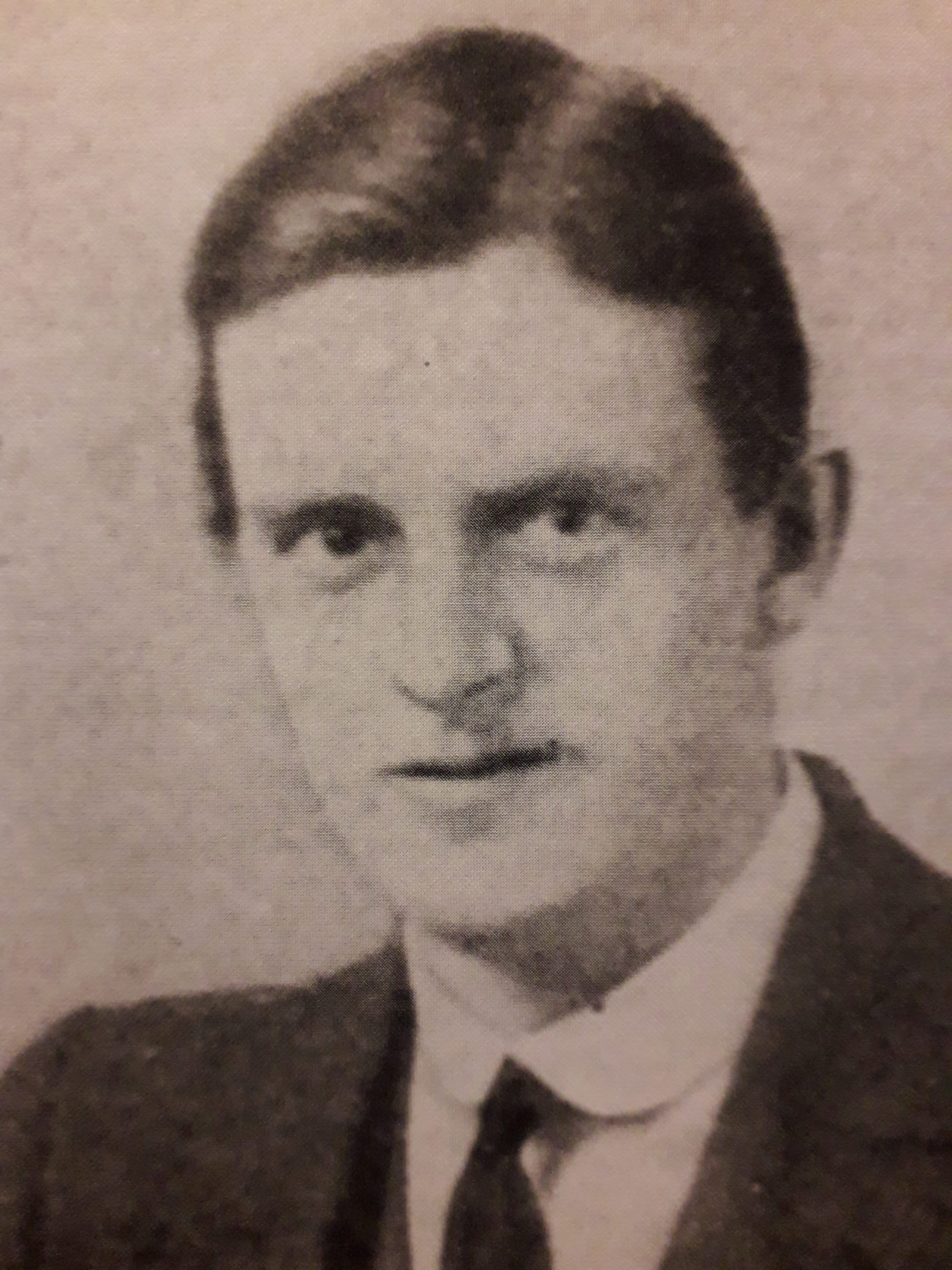

Personal details
- Born: 28 November 1889 Ireland
- Died: 7 April 1919 (aged 29) Knockalisheen, Limerick, Ireland
- Cause of death: Lung perforation from bullet
- Relatives: Alfie Byrne (cousin)
- Military career
- Allegiance: Ireland
- Branch: Irish Republican Army
- Rank: Battalion adjutant
- Units: 2 Battalion, Mid Limerick Brigade
- Conflicts: Irish War of Independence

Robert "Bobby" Byrne (28 November 1889 – 7 April 1919) was an Irish trade unionist, Republican and member of the IRA. He was the first Irish Republican that was killed in the Irish War of Independence.

== Early life ==
Byrne was born to Robert Byrne and Annie Hurley as one of nine children at 5 Upper Oriel Street, Dublin. His cousin Alfred "Alfie" Byrne would later become Lord Mayor of Dublin. Shortly after his birth his family moved to Town Wall Cottage, near St. Johns Hospital in Limerick.

== Political activities and imprisonment ==
After experiencing the political and social turmoil in Ireland after the 1913 Dublin Lockout and the 1916 Easter Rising, Byrne became an active member of the Postal Trade Union. In 1918 he lost his position as a telegraph operator in Limerick's general post office because of his political activities, his attendance at the funeral of John Daly and an anti-conscription meeting at Limerick Town Hall in 1918. In 1919 he held the rank of battalion adjutant of 2 Battalion, Mid Limerick Brigade of the IRA.

After a raid on his home by the RIC, Byrne was arrested and charged for the possession of a revolver with corresponding ammunition and binoculars in front of a court-martial. Because he didn't recognize the legitimacy of British Officers holding court over an Irish citizen, he denied entering a plea or even participating in the trial itself. Ignoring his protests, the court found him guilty and sentenced him to 12-months prison and hard labour. Directly after the verdict was spoken, he was transferred to Limerick Prison to start his sentence.

As a prisoner, he and sixteen other republican prisoners started a campaign, demanding status as political prisoners. As this was denied, they began barricading themselves in their cells, singing republican songs and damaging the interior and furniture of the cells. These protests were so loud that after a short while, onlookers and supporters started gathering outside the prison in support of the prisoners. The RIC reacted to these developments with physical violence, and solitary confinement. As a last resort, in February 1919, the prisoners went on hunger strike to continue their protest. After his health deteriorated because of the hunger strike, in mid-March 1919, Byrne was transferred to the Limerick Union Hospital, where he was placed in an ordinary ward under armed guard.

== Rescue attempt and death ==
On 6 April 1919, two IRA companies under the lead of John Gallagher (D Company) and Michael Stack (E Company), the only two who brought arms to the rescue attempt, went into the hospital, disguised as ordinary visitors and attempted a rescue operation. Around 20 volunteers went to the station on which Byrne was lying and after a signal whistle was blown, attacked and tried to overwhelm the two RIC-officers that were posted as guards. The RIC officers quickly realized the attempt and RIC constable James Spillane shot at Byrne, who wanted to stand up from his bed, from close range, hitting him in the lung. Michael Stack, in response, shot at constable James Spillane, injuring him and his colleague constable Martin O`Brien, killing him.

The volunteers left the hospital with the gravely injured Byrne, but the escape car and driver had in the meantime been ordered to another IRA operation and so they stopped a horse carriage at Hasset's Cross. The occupants of the carriage, John Ryan of Knockalisheen and his wife, brought the bleeding and injured Byrne to their house, put him to bed and called for medical and clerical assistance. After a doctor, John Holmes, had arrived and examined Byrne, a large bullet wound on the left side of his body was found, which had perforated his lung and his abdomen. The same night Robert Byrne died from his wounds.

== Aftermath ==
After Byrne's body was discovered by the authorities, the RIC placed Limerick under martial law and declared it a "Special Military Area". In response, the trade unions in Limerick started a "general strike against British militarism". This strike was called "The Limerick Soviet" by foreign journalists who reported from Limerick.

On the evening of April 8, Byrne's funeral was held. He was not able to be buried with his IRA-Uniform, because the RIC had removed it from him. Nevertheless, the funeral procession was accompanied by huge crowds and his remains, which lay in state in front of the high altar in St John's Cathedral, were visited by thousands from Limerick and surrounding areas.
