= Rory O'Connor (Irish republican) =

Irish republican (1883-1922)

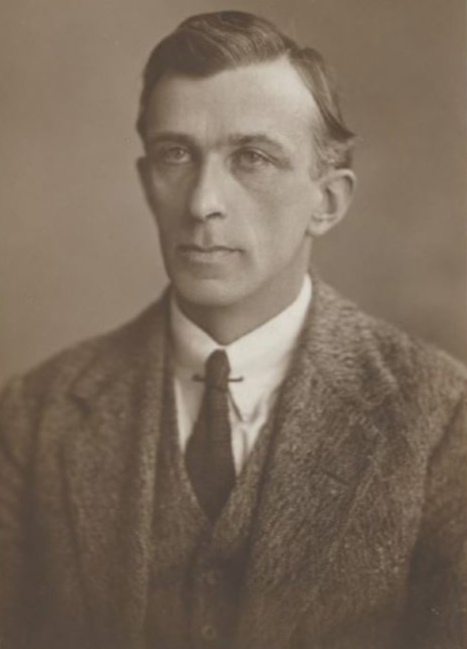
- Portrait of O'Connor, early 1920s
- Born: 28 November 1883; Dublin, Ireland
- Died: 8 December 1922 (aged 39); Mountjoy Gaol, Dublin, Ireland
- Cause of death: Execution by firing squad
- Military career
- Allegiance: Irish Republican Army (IRA); Irish Republican Brotherhood (IRB); Irish Volunteers
- Branch: Anti-Treaty IRA
- Rank: Commandant-general
- Conflicts: Easter Rising; Irish War of Independence; Irish Civil War

Roderick O'Connor (Irish: Ruairí Ó Conchubhair; 28 November 1883 – 8 December 1922) was an Irish republican who was Director of Engineering for the IRA in the Irish War of Independence. O'Connor opposed the Anglo-Irish Treaty of 1921 and was chairman of the republican military council that became the Anti-Treaty IRA in March 1922. He was the main spokesman for the republican side in the lead-up to the outbreak of the Irish Civil War in June of that year. On 30 June, O'Connor was taken prisoner at the conclusion of the attack by Free State forces on the Four Courts in Dublin. On 8 December 1922, he was executed along with three other senior members of the IRA Four Courts garrison. All four men were executed without trial or court martial.

== Background ==
O'Connor was born in Kildare Street, Dublin, on 28 November 1883. He was educated in St Mary's College, Dublin, and then in Clongowes Wood College, Co Kildare, a boarding school run by the Jesuit order. It was also attended by the man who would later condemn O'Connor to death, his close friend Kevin O'Higgins. O'Connor studied experimental physics, logic, and metaphysics; he also attended the College of Science, Merrion St. He took a Bachelor of Arts degrees in 1906 and received a Bachelor of Engineering in 1911, both at University College Dublin. Prominent in UCD's Literary and Historical Society, he advocated militant constitutional nationalism as one of the many society members active in the Young Ireland branch of the United Irish League.

O'Connor went to work as a railway engineer, moving to Canada where he was an engineer for the Canadian Pacific Railway and Canadian Northern Railway, being responsible for the construction of 1,500 miles (2,400 km) of railroad. O'Connor returned to Ireland in 1915 at Joseph Plunkett's request and worked for Dublin Corporation as a civil engineer. He joined the Ancient Order of Hibernians, a Catholic nationalist organisation, and served in the Easter Rising in 1916 in the GPO as an intelligence officer. O'Connor was wounded by a sniper during reconnaissance at the College of Surgeons.

== War of Independence ==
During the subsequent Irish War of Independence from 1919 to 1921 he was Director of Engineering of the Irish Republican Army (IRA), a military organisation descended from the Irish Volunteers. The specialist skills of engineering and signalling were essential to the development of the 5th Battalion, Dublin Brigade. Its men were forbidden frontline duty as their contribution was regarded as vital, their number too small. But units only expanded on an incremental local basis, disappointing Gen Richard Mulcahy.

O'Connor was also involved in the Republican breakout from Strangeways Prison in Manchester, England on 25 October 1919. Michael Collins had taken a particular interest in the escape, and actually visited Austin Stack in the prison under a false name to finalise the arrangements. IRA men held up traffic while a ladder was propped up against the outside of a prison wall. In all six prisoners were to escape, among them Piaras Beaslaí who had again been arrested.

== Outbreak of civil war ==
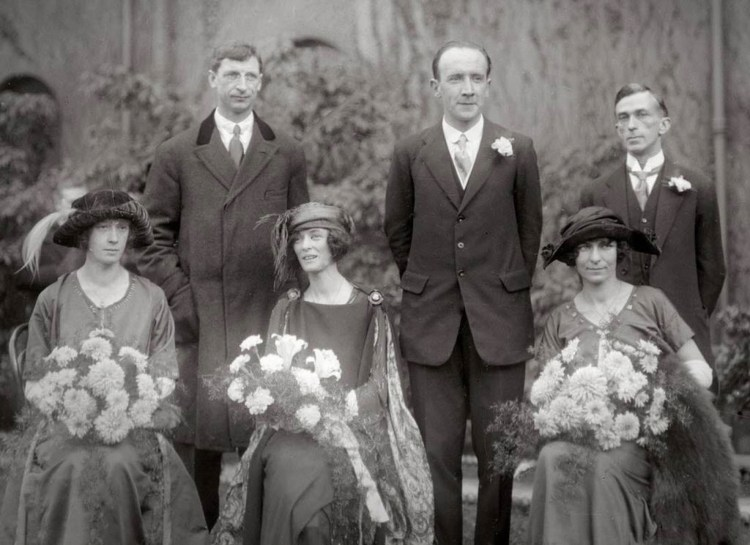
Back row l-r: Éamon de Valera, Kevin O'Higgins and his best man, Rory O'Connor, at O'Higgins' wedding, October 1921. A year later O'Higgins would sign O'Connor's death warrant

Rory O'Connor addressing members of the IRA's Dublin City Brigade at Smithfield, April 1922

O'Connor refused to accept the Anglo-Irish Treaty of 1921, which established the Irish Free State. It was ratified by a narrow vote in Dáil Éireann, the Irish parliament. O'Connor and many like him felt that the Treaty confirmed the partition of the six counties of Northern Ireland and undermined the Irish Republic declared in 1916. "Oh we must work it for all its worth. If I could get enough to support me I would oppose it wholeheartedly", O'Connor said to a fellow-IRA man, Liam Archer.

On 10 January, a meeting was held at O'Connor's home in Monkstown, Dublin. In attendance were all senior anti-Treaty IRA officers except Liam Mellows. O'Connor was appointed to chair this grouping, known as the Republican Military Council. It was agreed that an IRA convention should be called without delay; failing this, a separate GHQ would be formed.

At a further meeting in O'Connor's office on 20 March, a temporary IRA GHQ staff was elected under Liam Lynch as chief of staff. O'Connor remained in charge of engineering.

On 26 March 1922, the anti-Treaty officers of the IRA held a convention in Dublin, in which they rejected the Treaty and repudiated the authority of the Dáil. However, they were prepared to discuss a way forward. The convention met again on 9 April. It created a new army constitution and placed the army under a newly elected executive of 16 men, including O'Connor, that would choose an army council and headquarters staff. Asked by a journalist if this development meant the anti-treatyites were proposing a 'military dictatorship' in Ireland, O'Connor replied, "You can take it that way if you want."

On 14 April 1922 O'Connor was one of a number of IRA leaders in a 200-strong force of that occupied the Four Courts building in the centre of Dublin in defiance of the Provisional Government. They intended to provoke the British troops (who were still in the country) into attacking them, which they thought would restart the war with Britain and re-unite the IRA against their common enemy. British proposals which led to the Anglo Irish Treaty (signed 6 December 1921). They also occupied other smaller buildings regarded as being associated with the former British administration, such as the Ballast Office and the Freemasons' Hall in Molesworth Street, but the Four Courts remained the focus of interest. On 15 June, O'Connor sent out men to collect the rifles that belonged to the mutineers of the Civic Guards.

Michael Collins tried desperately to persuade the IRA men to leave the Four Courts. At the Third IRA Convention on 18 June, the Executive was split over whether the Irish Government should demand that all British troops leave within 72 hours. A motion to this effect, opposed by Lynch, was narrowly defeated, whereupon O'Connor and others left the meeting to set up a separate GHQ. The IRA had split into two factions opposed to the government.

On 22 June 1922 Sir Henry Wilson was assassinated in London by two IRA men, Reginald Dunne and Joseph O'Sullivan, each a former British soldier. Some now argue that this was done on the orders of Michael Collins, who had been a close friend of Dunne's in the London IRB. Lloyd George wrote an angry letter to Collins, which included the line "...still less can Mr. Rory O'Connor be permitted to remain his followers and his arsenal in open rebellion in the heart of Dublin... organizing and sending out from this centre enterprises of murder not only in the area of your Government..."

On 28 June 1922, after the Four Courts garrison had kidnapped Ginger O'Connell, a general in the National Army, Collins gave orders for the shelling of the Four Courts with borrowed artillery lent by Winston Churchill. The shelling led to the Four Courts catching fire, damaging parts of the building in addition to destroying numerous government documents. O'Connor was one of 130 men that surrendered on 30 June; some of these were arrested and imprisoned in Mountjoy. This incident marked the official start of the Irish Civil War, as fighting broke out openly around the country between pro- and anti-Treaty factions.

=== Execution ===
On 8 December 1922, along with three other republicans Liam Mellows, Richard Barrett and Joe McKelvey captured with the fall of the Four Courts, Rory O'Connor was executed by firing squad in reprisal for the anti-treaty IRA's killing of Free State TD Seán Hales. The execution order was signed by Kevin O'Higgins. O'Connor had been best man at his wedding on 27 October 1921. Their deaths remain a symbol of the bitterness and division of the Irish Civil War. O'Connor, one of 77 republicans executed by the Provisional Government, is seen as a martyr by the Republican movement in Ireland.

== Commemoration ==
"Rory O'Connor Place" in Arklow, County Wicklow is named in his honour. There is also a pub in Crumlin, Dublin named after him and a housing estate near Dún Laoghaire, County Dublin, called "Rory O'Connor Park".

On his execution, the equestrienne Joan de Sales La Terriere, a close friend of O'Connor, named her son in his honour.

A Sinn Féin cumann (UCD) is named after him.

== Sources ==
- Costigan, Giovanni (1968). "The Anglo-Irish Conflict, 1919-1922: A War of Independence or Systematized Murder?". University Review. 5 (1). Edinburgh: Edinburgh University Press: 64–86. JSTOR 25504818.
- Foster, G, 'Republicans and the Irish Civil War', New Hibernian Review (2012) p. 20–42.
- Hart, P, IRA at War 1916-1923 (OUP 2005)
- Hopkinson, Michael, Green against Green: the Irish Civil War (Dublin 1988)
- Hopkinson, M, The Irish War of Independence (Dublin and Montreal 2002)
- Macardle, Dorothy, The Irish Republic 1911-1923 (London 1937)
- O'Malley, Ernie, The Singing Flame (Dublin 1963)
- Purdon, Edward, The Irish Civil War 1922-23 (The Mercier Press Ltd 2000) ISBN 1856353001
