= Richard Barrett (Irish republican) =

IRA officer (1889-1922)

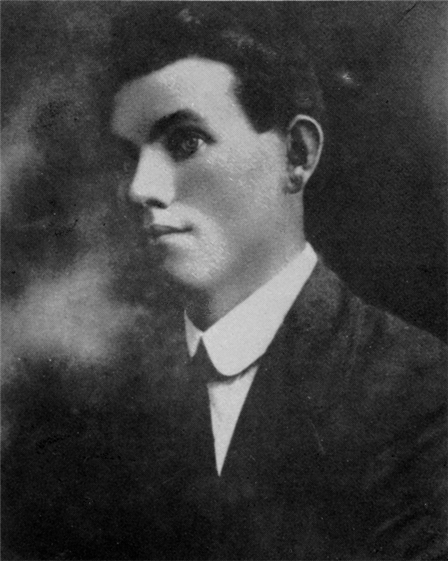
- Barrett c. 1913

Personal details
- Born: 17 December 1889 Knockacullen (Hollyhill), County Cork, Ireland
- Died: 8 December 1922 (aged 32) Mountjoy Prison, Dublin, Ireland
- Education: De La Salle College Waterford

Richard Barrett (17 December 1889 – 8 December 1922), commonly called Dick Barrett, was a prominent Irish Republican Army officer who fought in the War of Independence and on the Anti-Treaty side in the Irish Civil War. He was assistant quartermaster-general of the IRA with the rank of commandant. During the Civil War he was captured by Free State forces at the Four Courts on 30 June 1922 and later executed unlawfully on 8 December 1922.

Barrett's execution by the Free State has been described as "murder" by Irish Taoiseach and head of Fianna Fáil party Micheál Martin. In 2011, then Taoiseach Leo Varadkar said "People who were murdered or executed without trial by the Cumann na nGaedheal Government were murdered. It was an atrocity and those people killed without a trial by the first government were murdered."

== Early life ==
Richard Barrett was born 17 December 1889 in Knockacullen (Hollyhill), Ballineen, County Cork, son of Richard Barrett, farmer, and Ellen Barrett (née Henigan). Educated at Knocks and Knockskagh national schools, he entered the De La Salle College, Waterford, where he trained to be a teacher. Obtaining a first-class diploma, he first taught at Ballinamult, County Tipperary but then returned to Cork in early 1914 to take up a position at the Upton industrial school. Within months he was appointed principal of Gurrane National School. Devoted to the Irish language and honorary secretary of Knockavilla GAA club, Barrett did much to popularise both movements in the southern and western districts of Cork. He appears to have been a member of the Cork Young Ireland Society.

== War of Independence ==
From 1917, inspired by the Easter rising, Barrett took a prominent part in the organisation and operation of the Irish Volunteers and IRB. By this time he was also involved with Sinn Féin, in which role he attended the ard-fheis at the Mansion House in October 1917 and the convention of the Irish Volunteers at Croke Park immediately afterwards. What follows is a description of the convention by Richard Walsh:

"The Volunteer Convention was held in a building in Croke Park, known as the Pavilion, (the) end portion of this building was filled with hay. The large number of delegates seated themselves where convenient on portions of an open stand and around on the hay. Planks and forms were also used for seats. At the end of the building where the hay was a group of men assembled, of whom it could be said they were the men of destiny in the Ireland of our time. The Chairman of the Convention was Eamon de Valera. Behind him, lying on the pile of hay, were Michael Collins, Cathal Brugha, Austin Stack, Dermot Lynch, Eamon Duggan, Dermot O'Hegarty, Michael Staines, Liam Lynch of Cork, Terence McSwiney of Cork, Ernest Blythe, Joe McKelvey, Dick Barrett, Frank Barrett of Clare, Mick Brennan and one of his brothers of Clare, Sean MacEntee of Belfast, James Keaveney, Sligo, Alec McCabe of Sligo, Dory O'Connor, Dick McKee, Oscar Traynor, William M. O'Reilly and some of the McQuills of Dundalk, Brian O'Higgins, Laurence O'Toole, etc. All the prominent men in the republican physical force movement of that time were present."

Through planning and participating in raids and gun-running episodes, Barrett came into close contact with many GHQ staff during the War of Independence, thereby ensuring his own rapid promotion. Dick Barrett was an active IRA brigade staff officer and occasionally acted as commandant of the West Cork III Brigade. He also organised fundraising activities for the purchase of weapons and for comrades on the run. In July 1920, following the arrest of the Cork III Brigade commander Tom Hales and quartermaster Pat Harte, Barrett was appointed its quartermaster. He was arrested on 22 March 1921 and imprisoned in Cork jail, later being sent to Spike Island, County Cork.

== Spike Island ==
As one of the senior officers held in Spike Island, Barrett was involved in many of the incidents that occurred during his time there. After the truce was declared on 11 July 1921, some prisoners went on hunger strike but Barrett called it off after a number of days on instructions from outside as a decision had been made that able-bodied men were more important to the cause.

In November, he escaped by row boat alongside Moss (Maurice) Twomey, Henry O'Mahoney, Tom Crofts, Bill Quirke, Dick Eddy and Paddy Buckley.

== Irish Civil War ==
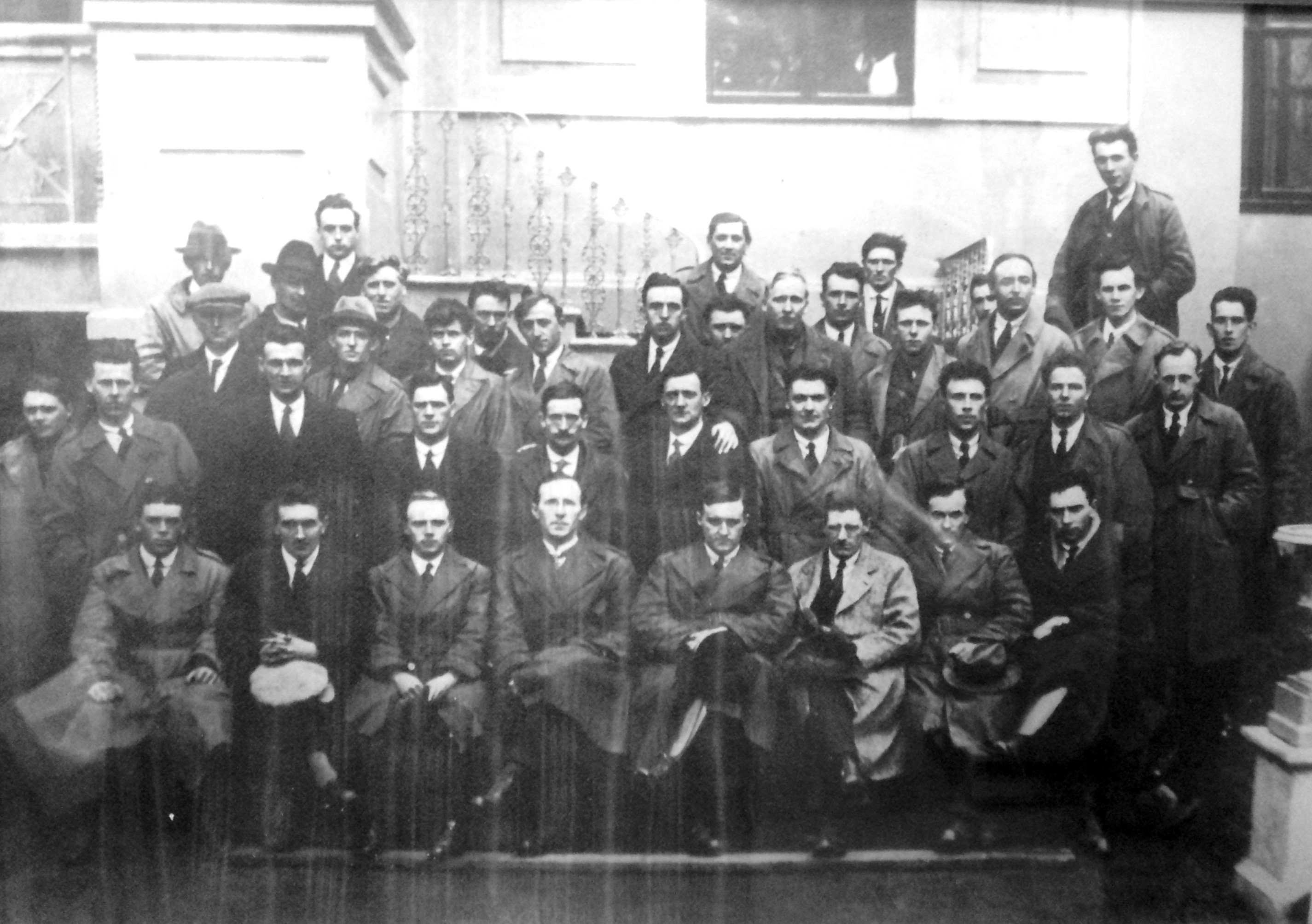
Liam Lynch with some of his divisional staff and officers of the brigades including the 1st Southern Division who attended as delegates to the Anti-treaty Army Convention at the Mansion House, Dublin on 9 April 1922. Barrett is second from the right in the third row back.

Following the War of Independence, Barrett supported the Anti-Treaty IRA's refusal to submit to the authority of the Dáil (civil government of the Irish Republic declared in 1919). He was opposed to the Anglo-Irish Treaty and called for the total elimination of English influence in Ireland. In April 1922, Barrett was one of some 200 hardline anti-treaty men who took over the Four Courts building in the centre of Dublin in defiance of the new Irish government. They wanted to provoke British troops, who were still in the country, into attacking them. They hoped this would restart the war with Britain and reunite the IRA against their common enemy. However, on 28 June 1922, after the Four Courts garrison had kidnapped J.J. O'Connell, a general in the new Free State Army, Collins' soldiers shelled the Four Courts and sparked off what became known as the Battle of Dublin. The garrison surrendered following two days of fighting. Barrett, the assistant quartermaster-general, was arrested and held with most of his comrades in Mountjoy Gaol. This incident marked the official outbreak of the Irish Civil War, as fighting escalated around the country between pro- and anti-treaty factions.

== Execution ==
After the death of Michael Collins in an ambush, a period of tit-for-tat revenge killings ensued. The government implemented martial law and enacted the necessary legislation to set up military courts. In November, the government began to execute Anti-Treaty prisoners, including Erskine Childers. In response, Liam Lynch, the Anti-Treaty Chief of Staff, gave an order that any member of the Dáil who had voted for the 'murder legislation' was to be shot on sight.

On 7 December 1922, TD Seán Hales was killed by anti-Treaty IRA men as he left the Dáil. Another TD Pádraic Ó Máille was also shot and badly wounded in the incident. An emergency cabinet meeting was allegedly held the next day to discuss the assassination of Hales. It was proposed that four prominent members of the Anti-Treaty side currently held as prisoners be executed as a reprisal and deterrent. The names put forward were Barrett, Rory O'Connor, Liam Mellows and Joe McKelvey. It has been alleged that the four were chosen to represent each of the four provinces – Munster, Connacht, Leinster and Ulster respectively, but none of the four was actually from Connacht. The executions were ordered by Justice Minister Kevin O'Higgins. At 2 o'clock on the morning of 8 December 1922, Dick Barrett was awoken along with the other three and informed that they were all to be executed at 8 o'clock that morning.

Letter written to his family on the morning of his execution.

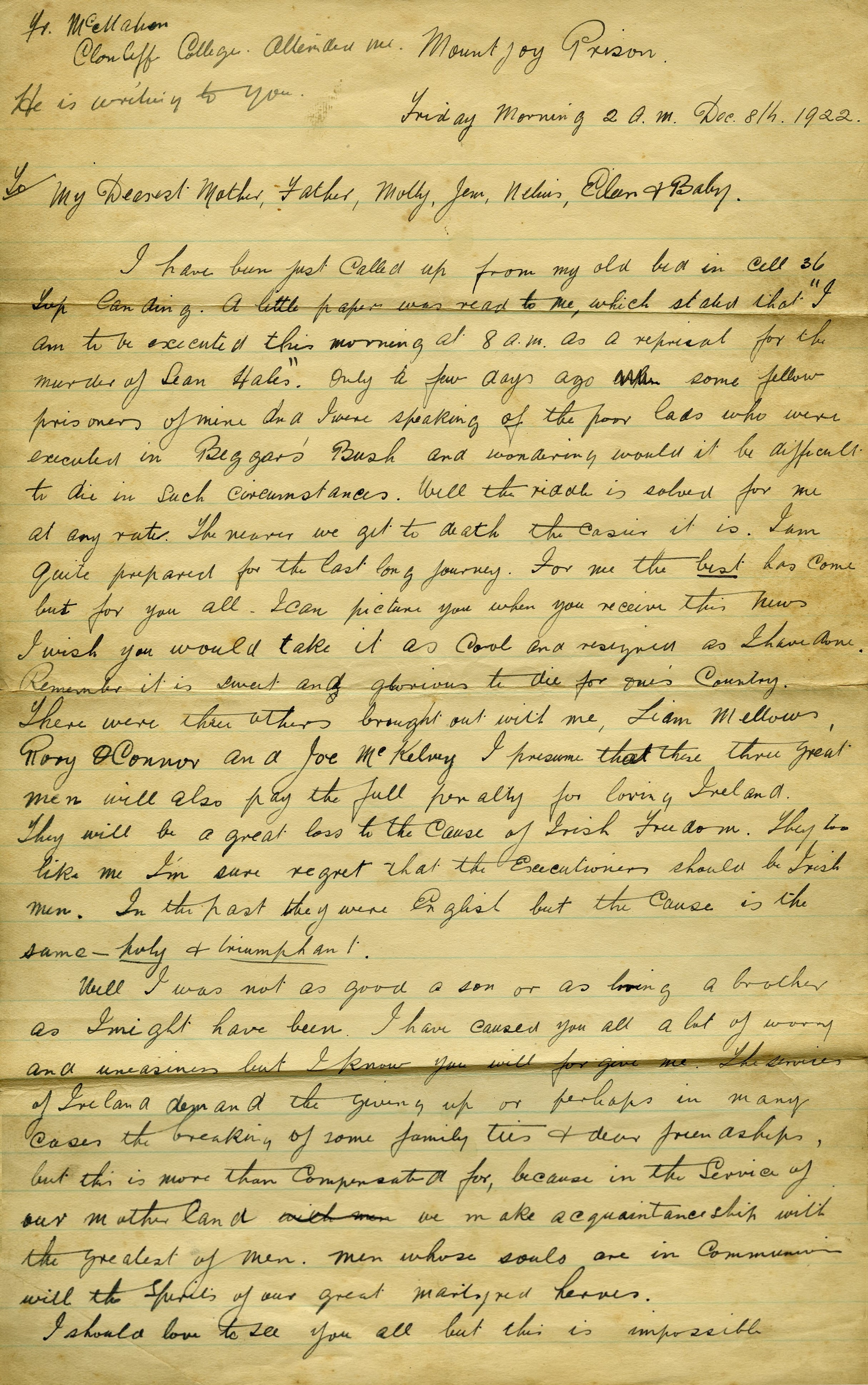

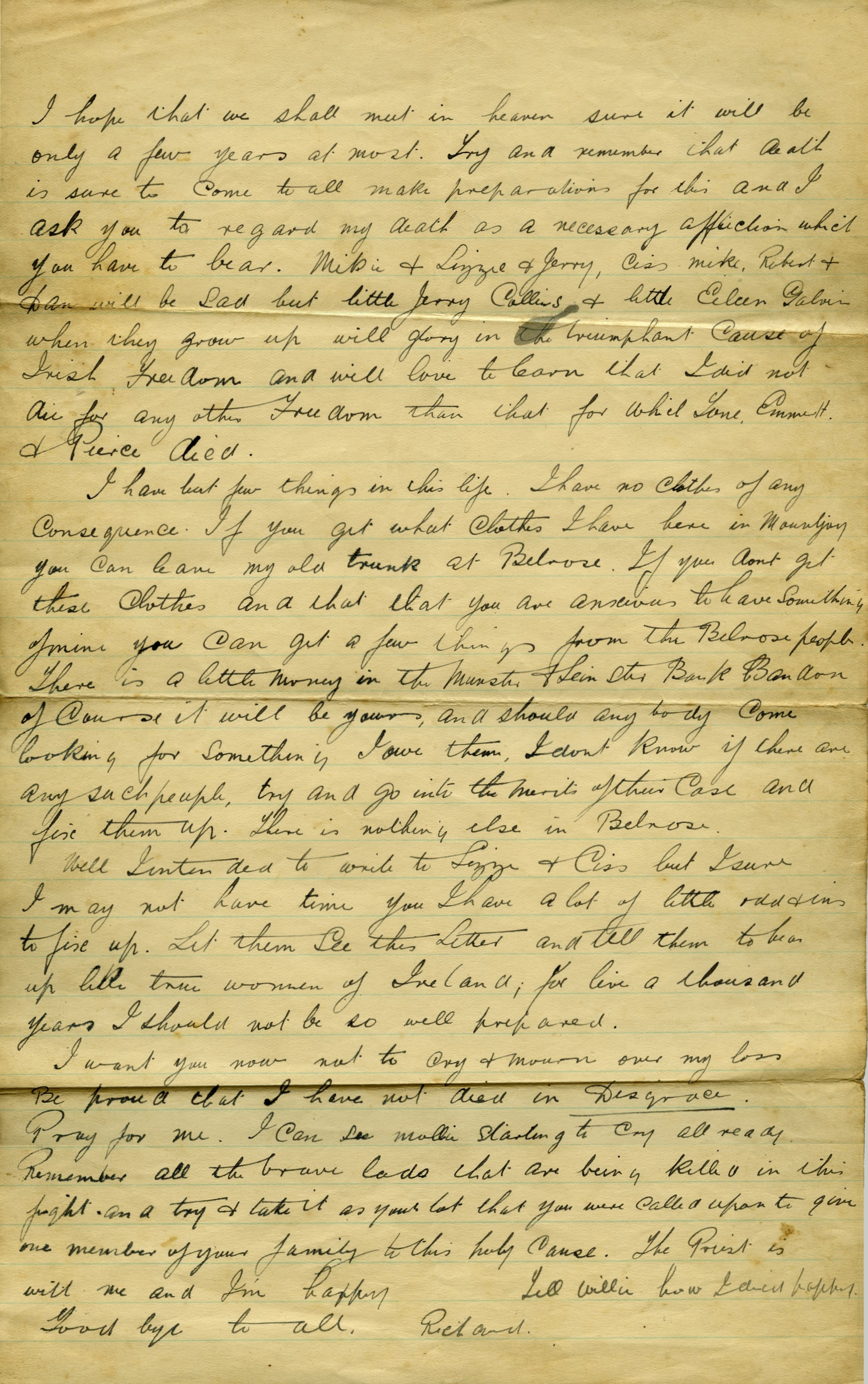

Bloody ironies would stack one upon the other. Barrett was a member of the same IRA brigade as Hales during the Anglo-Irish War, and they were childhood friends. O'Connor had been best man at O'Higgins' wedding less than a year earlier. The rest of Seán Hales's family had remained staunchly anti-Treaty, and publicly denounced the executions. In reprisal for O'Higgins's role in the executions, the Anti-Treaty IRA killed his father and burned his family home in Stradbally, County Laois. O'Higgins himself would die by an assassin's hand on 10 July 1927 (see also Executions during the Irish Civil War).

The executions stunned Ireland. The Free State government continued to execute enemy prisoners, and 81 men were executed by the Free State army by the end of the war.

Barrett is now buried in his home county, Cork, following exhumation and reinterment by a later government. A monument was erected by old comrades of the West Cork Brigade, the First Southern Division, IRA, and of the Four Courts, Dublin, garrison in 1922 which was unveiled on 13 December 1952 by the Tánaiste Seán Lemass.

A poem about the execution was written by Galway clergyman Pádraig de Brún.
