= Hugh McAteer =

Irish republican military commander (1916–1970)

- Aodh Mac an tSaoir

Chief of Staff of the IRA
- In office 19 July 1942 – 12 October 1942
- Preceded by: Eoin McNamee
- Succeeded by: Charlie Kerins

Personal details
- Born: 13 August 1916 Derry, Ireland
- Died: 24 June 1970 (aged 53) Belfast, Northern Ireland
- Resting place: Milltown Cemetery
- Relatives: Eddie McAteer (Brother)

Military service
- Branch/service: Fianna Éireann; Irish Republican Army
- Rank: Volunteer (c. 1932–1935); Officer Commanding (1935–1936); Chief of Staff (1942)
- Unit: Derry Battalion
- Battles/wars: Northern Campaign

Hugh McAteer (Irish: Aodh Mac an tSaoir; 13 August 1916 – 24 June 1970) was a volunteer in, and leader of, the Irish Republican Army (IRA) during their Northern Campaign, and later in 1950 and 1964 unsuccessfully contested for a seat in the British Parliament.

== Biography ==
Hugh McAteer's family came from northern Donegal, they suffered greatly during the Great Famine (Ireland). During the famine, McAteer's grandfather was the only survivor among six children. As a young boy McAteer joined Fianna Éireann, an Irish nationalist youth organization. He remembered that in 1928 his group was meeting in a field when the police surrounded the field and fired shots over the heads of the boys. At age 15 McAteer joined the Gaelic League and at age 16 the IRA . By 1935, Hugh McAteer was the Officer Commanding of the IRA's Derry Battalion. In July 1936 five members of the McAteer family were arrested in Derry on weapons and explosive charges. In order to save his family members from prosecution Hugh took full responsibility for all charges. He was tried and sentenced to 7 years imprisonment. While in jail he studied the Irish language and guerilla warfare techniques. He was released in 1941.

A bookkeeper by profession, McAteer was from Derry. He served as IRA Chief of Staff (COS) from 19 July until 12 October 1942. With his appointment as COS the leadership of the IRA shifted from being Dublin based to leaders from the north of Ireland: McAteer, Seán McCaughey, Pearse Kelly and Eoin McNamee. In late 1942 McAtee was captured by the Royal Ulster Constabulary. He was sentenced to 15 years imprisonment on the charge of treason. On 15 January 1943 (along with three senior IRA men Patrick Donnelly, Ned Maguire and Jimmy Steele), he escaped over the wall from Crumlin Road Gaol, Belfast. A reward of 3,000 pounds was announced for the capture of any or all of the four escapees (Maguire and Donnelly were never recaptured).

On Easter Saturday, 24 April 1943, he participated in the Broadway Cinema operation on the Falls Road, Belfast when armed IRA men took over the cinema, stopped the film, and went on stage and read a statement from the IRA Army Council and the Proclamation of the 1916 Easter Rising. The statement denounced the British military presence in Northern Ireland as an "invasion of our rights" and warned that they will be targeted in "a resumption of hostilities between the Irish Republic and Great Britain".

McAteer was subsequently rearrested on 21 November 1943, returned to Crumlin Road Gaol and participated in the ongoing hunger strike there. With the loss of McAteer and increased pressure from the police, the Belfast IRA was no longer a significant fighting force. Rearrested in July 1945 for recruiting for the IRA, he was released in 1950 along with other IRA prisoners.

In 1950, McAteer ran as a Sinn Féin candidate for the Londonderry constituency in the British general election on an independent republican abstentionist ticket. He polled 21,880 votes or 37.41%. (Other Republican candidates included Jimmy Steele (for West Belfast) and Liam Burke (for Mid Ulster). The three candidates polled 23,362 votes together but were not elected. McAteer left the IRA in the early 1950s but still had influence. He informed the Irish government that it was possible that the IRA would accept the authority of the State. In 1954 the IRA issued a standing order barring operations against the forces of the southern state. He also contested the 1964 British general election for the same constituency and on the same ticket, polling 21,123 votes (35.91%). He ran for office again in 1964 for the same constituency, this time polling 36% of the vote.

== Family ==
McAteer was the third son of Hugh McAteer, a labourer, and Bridget Doherty. He was a brother of Eddie McAteer, leader of the Nationalist Party and Stormont MP.

Hugh McAteer's son, Aidan, was a personal assistant to Gerry Adams and onetime staff officer of the IRA's Belfast Brigade.

His many interests included Irish Traditional singing and he even provided the notes for an album entitled "Ireland Her Own" (Topic Records, 1967), recorded by two former IRA volunteers - Paddy Tunney and Arthur Kearney - who had been imprisoned with him in the Crumlin Road Gaol in the 1940s.

== Death ==
McAteer died suddenly in Belfast on 24 June 1970. He is buried in Miltown Cemetery, Belfast.
