= Northern campaign (Irish Republican Army) =

Attempts by the IRA to destabilise Northern Ireland between 1942 and 1944

Date	2 September 1942 – December 1944
Location	Mainly the border area between Northern Ireland and Ireland
Result	British victory

Belligerents
Northern Ireland: Royal Ulster Constabulary; Ireland: Garda Síochána	IRA

Commanders and leaders
J. M. Andrews; Basil Brooke; Éamon de Valera	Hugh McAteer; Charlie Kerins (executed)

Strength
Unknown	~300-500 volunteers

Casualties and losses
6 killed Unknown wounded	3 killed Unknown wounded

The Northern campaign was a series of attacks by the Irish Republican Army (IRA) Northern Command between September 1942 and December 1944 against the security forces in Northern Ireland. The action taken by the Northern Irish and the Irish governments as a result of these attacks shattered the IRA and resulted in the former being free from IRA activity by the end of World War II. In December 1956 the IRA began its Border Campaign which lasted until February 1962.

== The campaign ==
The Taoiseach of Ireland, Éamon de Valera, complained about the occupation of Irish soil with the arrival of American soldiers in Northern Ireland as part of the UK war effort against Nazi Germany. This influx of foreign soldiers encouraged the northern command of the IRA, under the auspices of newly appointed IRA Chief of Staff Hugh McAteer, to reorganise and on 25 March 1942 agree a new campaign against the British military and war effort in Northern Ireland.

Over the first few months of the campaign, a few attacks against the Royal Ulster Constabulary (RUC) in Strabane, Dungannon, and Belfast, resulted in the death of two RUC constables and the wounding of two others. Six IRA members, including Joe Cahill, were arrested during the Belfast incident and sentenced to death for the murder of one of the constables. A petition signed by around two hundred thousand people calling for mercy was gathered by those calling for a reprieve, and several days before the date of the executions, all but one was commuted. The sole IRA member executed was Tom Williams who was hanged at Crumlim Road gaol, Belfast, on 2 September 1942, resulting in the IRA intensifying their attacks.

After the bombing of Randalstown RUC station, and more gunfire attacks against the RUC in parts of West Belfast and across the border area between Northern Ireland and Ireland, around 320 members and suspected members of the IRA, including Hugh McActeer, were arrested across Northern Ireland. One historian, Bowyer-Bell, reports a total of 60 armed attacks by the IRA in the three months up to December 1942, carried out by the remaining fifty to sixty IRA members still at large.

In the first few months of 1943, jail breaks at Crumlin Road and Derry gaols saw 23 IRA members, including McAteer, escape. This however failed to inspire a resumption of activity. Many of the escapees had crossed the border into County Donegal in Ireland and were subsequently recaptured by the Irish Army. The few others that escaped arrest sought refuge from pursuit rather than resuming their attacks.

IRA northern command units in south Londonderry and south Armagh were no longer able to function as required, and contact with units in Counties Cavan and Monaghan started to wane. Bowyer-Bell states of the late-1943 to mid-1943 period that the local commanding officers preferred to avoid arrest, and that anything associated with the IRA such as parades, training, and even meetings ended with fear of internment at Curragh.

By the end of World War II in 1945, the northern command of the IRA, largely as a result of the stern response from the Irish government, had been reduced to a few wanted men with Northern Ireland entirely free from IRA activity. The Northern Ireland government couldn't publicly acknowledge the fact their neighbour had essentially defeated the IRA, and the Irish Minister of Justice, Gerald Boland, was heard to boast during the period that "the IRA was dead and he had killed it".

== Chronology of campaign ==
=== 1942 ===
- Easter Sunday – a heavy gunfight in Belfast left a RUC constable dead, with six IRA members arrested in Cawnpore Street in response. In Dublin, Irish Special Branch attempted to arrest Lasarian Mangan and Brendan Behan. When Mangan seemed to hesitate in using his gun, Behan was heard to shout "Use it, use it. Give it to me and I will shoot the bastards.". Behan was later arrested in Dublin and received fourteen years in prison. The third incident in the time line involved Frank Morris, who began shooting when detained at a RUC border checkpoint in Strabane. He was captured 10 hours later that day, found hiding, immersed up to his neck in river water.
- 20 April – A new IRA Army Council was elected in the wake of these incidents. At this time it is known that Eoin McNamee in his capacity as Adjutant General met with German agent Günther Schütz shortly before this.
- 15 August – IRA Army Council meets to confirm the details of the Northern campaign and to draw up a Campaign Proclamation. By this stage the arms and munitions from the IRA's Western and Eastern Command areas had been assembled on the border ready for transport into Northern Ireland.
- 30 August – IRA GHQ sends word to waiting units to begin the transfer of arms into Northern Ireland. That night three tons of material were transported over the border into Newry, County Down. Two lorries were used to transport the material through RUC checkpoints without incident. The arms were then stored in a barn attached to McCafferty's farm outside Hannahstown, County Antrim. The member overseeing the operation on the ground, Daragh O'Connor reported back to GHQ Belfast in person. His message was that the operation had been successful, and distribution of the material could now begin. Unfortunately for the IRA, a member sent to help Daragh O'Connor to the farm by members of the RUC who proceeded to raid the building. In the ensuing gun battle O'Connor was shot dead and 3 tons of arms seized. This however, was not the only shipment of arms into Northern Ireland the IRA had made, and the others were to remain, as yet, undetected.
- 1 September – The Army Council issued a General Army Order that in the event of the execution of Tommy Williams, all CO's were to take aggressive action.
- 2 September – Tom Williams' execution at 8am, The first attack afterwards, was scheduled to take place against a British Army barracks in Crossmaglen, County Armagh with twenty IRA members led by Patrick Dermody and Charlie Kerins in a commandeered lorry and accompanying car. A passing RUC patrol, however, noticed the IRA convoy as it moved through Cullaville and in the ensuing gun battle the police surrendered and were released. According to IRA member Harry White, who wrote about the raid in his book of memoirs "Harry", they hoped to capture a British officer and hang him.
- 3 September – The front of a police barracks in Randalstown, County Antrim, was demolished by a mine and a RUC sergeant was injured. A failed attack in Belfast saw Gerry Adams Sr. wounded by the RUC.
- 4 September – The ambush of an IRA patrol in Belfast resulted in James Bannon being wounded. The same day a mine failed to detonated during the attack on Belleek, RUC barracks, County Fermanagh.
- 5 September – A County Antrim police barracks was bombed, RUC men were fired on in County Fermanagh and two RUC were killed in Clady, County Tyrone.
- 9 September – Sergeant Denis O'Brien, a serving Irish Special Branch officer and himself a former IRA member, was shot dead by 3 IRA members outside his home in Ballyboden, Rathfarnham, County Dublin. This action was directly against IRA Army Council orders which forbade any operations of a military nature in Éire. Notice of a five thousand pound reward was issued for information leading to the apprehension of O'Brien's killers along with a list of men wanted in connection with the incident. Michael Quille was later apprehended by the RUC and turned over to Irish Special Branch in connection with the incident. This led to his internment in January 1943.

Following the initial raid in September, the RUC and Irish Special Branch stepped up their efforts against the IRA. A series of arms finds and arrests were made.

- 10 September – Belfast IRA lost two members when they were surrounded in a house and captured.
- 30 September – Patrick Dermody was killed by Irish Special Branch following a gun battle in County Cavan. A member of Garda Síochána (Irish Police) also died due to friendly fire from his colleagues.
- 12 October – McAteer and his Director of Intelligence, O'Reilly, were arrested in Northern Ireland by the RUC Criminal Investigation Department (CID). McAteer was later sentenced to 15 years imprisonment for treason, and his position taken over by Charlie Kerins, who was later relieved by Harry White in late October.
- 19 October – Maurice O'Neill, was captured by Garda Síochána during a raid on a safe house in Holly Road, Donnycarney, County Dublin. A detective died during the raid. Harry White escaped and travelled to Belfast to take over as OC for Northern Command. During his trial by Military Tribunal in Éire, O'Neill was represented by Seán MacBride. MacBride failed however, to win O'Neill a reprieve and he was executed by the Irish Government on 12 November 1942.
- October – An RUC member was killed in an IRA attack on Donegall Pass, RUC station in Belfast.

=== 1943 ===
- 15 January – IRA northern command commander, Hugh McAteer, along with another IRA member escaped over the wall of Crumlin Road gaol, Belfast.
- 14 February – IRA Army Council despite losing the ability to carry out their campaign resolved that "A political arm be formed representative of the whole country, whose constitution shall be based on the Constitution of the Republic proclaimed in arms in 1916 and ratified by the free vote of the Irish people in 1918."
- 21 March – using an 80 foot long tunnel, 21 IRA prisoners escape from Derry Gaol in Derry.
- 24 April 1943– The IRA, including McAteer, took over the Falls Road Broadway cinema in Belfast, and whilst holding its staff at gunpoint, forced the cinema audience to take part in a commemoration of the Easter Rising. A Proclamation of the 1916 Easter Rising was read out to the audience along with the IRA Army Council's annual statement, which included a denouncement of the American military presence in Northern Ireland as an "..invasion of our rights..." and warned that US troops could expect to be targeted in any "..resumption of hostilities between the Irish Republic [as invested in the IRA] and Great Britain."
- May – IRA members who had escaped from Derry gaol were re-arrested.
- October – McAteer rearrested. Kerins assumed command again.
- 4 July – Jackie Griffith shot dead in Dublin by Garda Síochána detectives.
- Unknown date – RUC constable shot dead during an attempted robbery at Ross's Mill, Belfast.

=== 1944 ===
- In the early months of 1944 little or no communication was shared between IRA units in the North and the Dublin GHQ. Little money was available to conduct operations and travel between the Irish Free State and the North was avoided.
- 11 February – Seamus "Rocky" Burns was mortally wounded during a gun battle with RUC in Derry city. Burns was 23 years old.
- 15 June – The Chief of Staff of the Irish Republican Army Charlie Kerins was arrested at 50 Rathmines Road in Dublin. He was tried by military tribunal (he refused to recognize the authority of the court) by the Irish state and found guilty on 9 October 1944 of involvement in the death of detective O'Brien on 9 September 1942, and subsequently hanged on 1 December 1944.

== Further information ==
The Secret Army – The IRA J Bowyer Bell 1997 3rd Edition, ISBN 1-85371-813-0

== See also ==
- Irish Republican Army – Abwehr collaboration in World War II
