= IRA Southern Command =

Irish Republican Army command division

IRA Southern Command was a command division in the Irish Republican Army (1922–1969) and Provisional Irish Republican Army (PIRA), responsible for providing logistical support in the South (Irish Free State and later the Republic of Ireland) for IRA Northern Command operations in Northern Ireland. It was headquartered in Dublin.

== IRA ==
The IRA had difficulty with cross-border communications between Dublin and Belfast after the outbreak of the Second World War, and some northern-based members of the IRA believed a self-contained unit was required. Charlie McGlade, a printer from Belfast, was the architect of the idea, and the IRA Northern Command was formed in 1939 taking responsibility for IRA operations in the six counties of Northern Ireland and also County Donegal, while Southern Command took responsibility for the other 25 counties of Ireland. By the early 1950s, both Northern Command and Southern Command had faded away, and the leadership of the IRA was southern-based, with all commands being issued from Dublin.

== Provisional Irish Republican Army ==
With the creation of the IRA Northern Command in 1976 during the height of the Troubles, the Southern Command shifted its functions to logistical support in the 21 counties in the South, such as weapons procurement made in the Republic or overseas, training volunteers, financing, and safe houses for the Provisional Irish Republican Army (PIRA). The IRA Northern Command encompassed not only the six counties in the North but also the border areas of the Republic of Ireland (Louth, Monaghan, Donegal, Leitrim, and Cavan).
