= Jimmy Steele (Irish republican) =

Irish republican militant and editor

Jimmy Steele (8 August 1907 – 9 August 1970) was an Irish republican militant. He was one of the most prominent Irish Republican Army (IRA) men in Belfast after the Irish Civil War who held practically every senior position in the Northern Command of the IRA. Later in life Steele publicly denounced the leadership of the IRA which was a prelude to the split in the IRA (Official and Provisional Irish Republican Army). Steele founded and edited several Irish Republican publications. Steele spent a large portion of his life (20 years) in jails as a result of his actions against British security forces.

Steele joined Fianna Éireann in 1920 during the Irish War of Independence and later went on to join the IRA. He was arrested in 1923 and again in 1924 and imprisoned in Crumlin Road Gaol. After his release in 1925, Steele helped in the re-organisation of the IRA's Belfast Brigade.

In the summer of 1935 Steele led IRA units in the defense of Catholic homes during the Lancaster Street riots. Also in 1935, Steele led an IRA raid on a RUC base within the grounds of Campbell College, a school in the east of the city. The raid was unsuccessful due to a tip-off, and Steele managed to escape. The following year he was arrested for the raid along with several other IRA members and again sent to Crumlin Road Gaol on a five year sentence. While in jail, Steele was one of eight Irish Republican prisoners conducting a hunger strike demanding political status. During this time Jimmy Steele spent 32 days on hunger strike.

In 1943 Steele, along with Patrick Donnelly, Ned Maguire and Hugh McAteer escaped from the Gaol through a trap door in the ceiling of a third floor toilet. Using knotted sheets, the men lowered themselves to the prison yard and used a hand made rope ladder to scale the 20 foot high wall. Shortly afterwards he was appointed adjutant of the Northern Command. While on the run he helped 21 prisoners escape from jail on 20 March 1943, this was known as The Big Derry Jail Escape. Several weeks later (on Easter Saturday 1943) Steele made news and a major propaganda coup when he led a group of armed Belfast IRA men as they took over the Broadway Cinema in Belfast. Steele and his men held a commemoration of the 1916 Easter Rising with Steele reading the Proclamation of the Irish Republic and Hugh McAteer (former Chief of Staff of the Irish Republican Army) reading a statement from the IRA Army Council to a stunned audience.

Steele was arrested again on 29 May 1943. In late 1943 Steele was sentenced to 12 years in jail and was subjected to 12 "strokes of the birch" (permissible under the Special Powers Act (Northern Ireland) 1922. Steele had been arrested on charges related to the IRAs bombing/sabotage campaign in England - the S-Plan. Steele was the last S-Plan internee released (October 1950).

While interned in Belfast jail Steele and 22 other Irish republican prisoners (one of which was the well known Irish Republican Gerry Adams Sr.) tried to secure treatment as political prisoners. When their requests were denied 22 prisoners went on a "strip strike" in which they removed their prison uniforms, refusing to wear the clothing of a common criminal. Prison authorities responded by removing everything from the prisoners cells except the frame of the bed, a sanitary vessel and a carafe of water for the whole day. (Mattress and blanket were returned at the end of the day.) The strike was called off after about three months.

Steele was founder of the Belfast Republican Press Centre in 1970. He was the first editor of Republican News, which started as a monthly and later became a weekly. Steele was also arrested/imprisoned in 1967. He wrote for a number of republican publications, including Glor Uladh, Resurgent Ulster and An Phoblacht. In the 1950 United Kingdom general election Steele stood for Sinn Féin in the West Belfast constituency while the former IRA Chief of Staff Hugh McAteer ran in Derry.

He died on 9 August 1970 the year after the IRA split between the Official IRA and the Provisional IRA, in which he sided with the Provisionals. He was one of the leaders of the 1969 split, being critical of the leadership of the time and the republican movements turn to the left . Speaking at the reinternment of two executed IRA men from the sabotage campaign of 1939-40 (Peter Barnes and James McCormick) Steele said:

Our two martyred comrades who we honour today … went forth to carry the fight to the enemy, into enemy territory, using the only methods that will ever succeed, not the method of the politicians, nor the constitutionalists, but the method of soldiers, the method of armed force. The ultimate aim of the Irish nation will never emerge from the political or constitutional platform. Indeed, one is expected to be more conversant with the teaching of Chairman Mao than those of our dead patriots.

Steele was buried in Milltown Cemetery west Belfast.

Military offices
Preceded by Charlie McGlade	Officer Commanding the Belfast Battalion of the Irish Republican Army; 1940	Succeeded by Liam Rice
Preceded by Rory Maguire	Officer Commanding the Belfast Battalion of the Irish Republican Army; 1943	Succeeded by Seamus Burns
Preceded by Frank McKearney	Officer Commanding the Belfast Battalion of the Irish Republican Army; 1950 – 1956	Succeeded by Paddy Doyle
Media offices
Preceded by New position	Editor of Republican News; 1970	Succeeded by Proinsias MacAirt
