= Derry Gaol =

Coordinates: 54.994°N 7.326°W

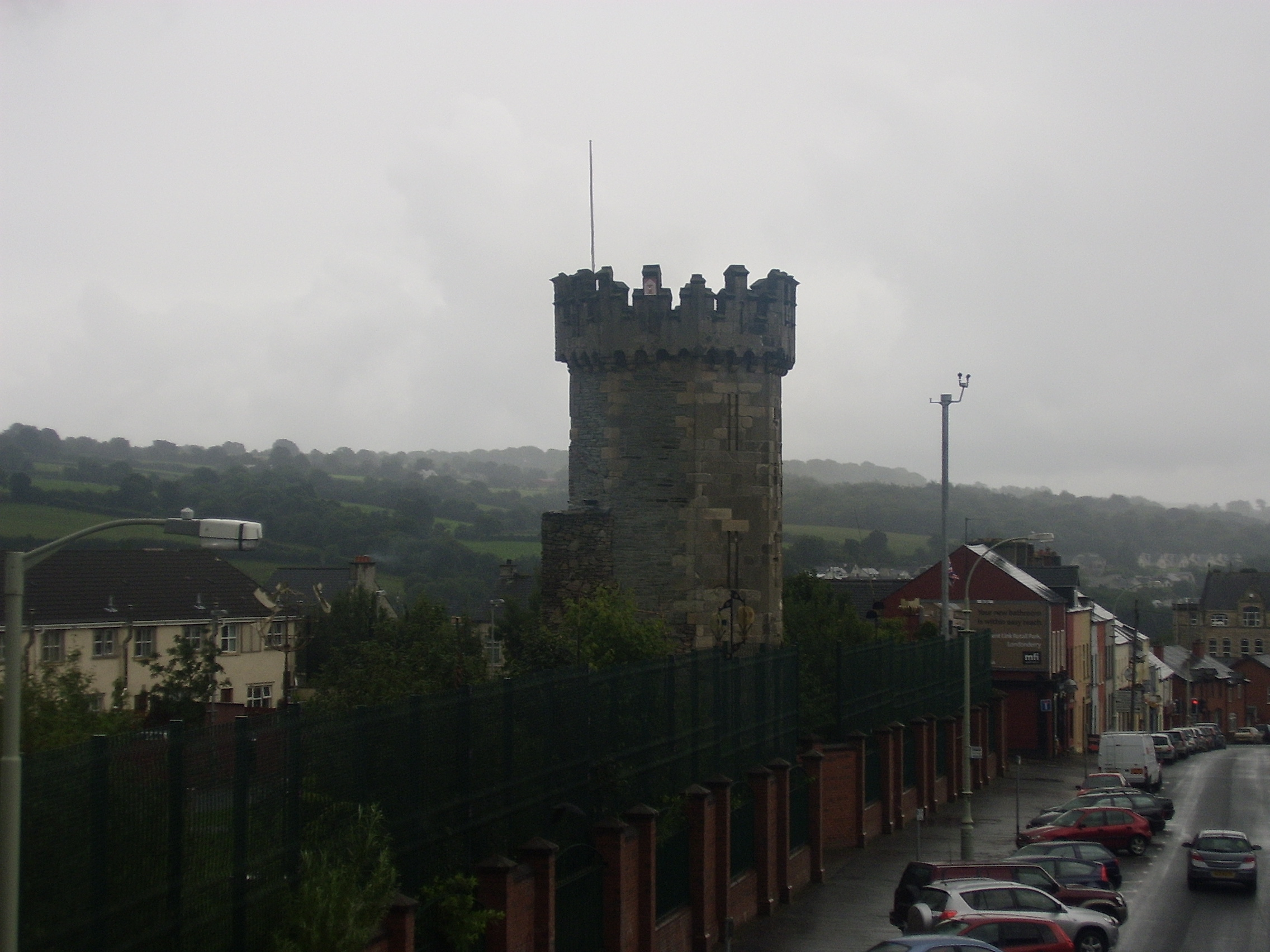
Remaining tower of Derry Gaol on Bishop Street.

Derry Gaol, also known as Londonderry Gaol, refers to one of several gaols (prisons) constructed consecutively in Derry, Northern Ireland. Derry Gaol is notable as a place of incarceration for Irish Republican Army (IRA) members during the Irish Civil War, and for its numerous executions, seven of which took place between 1820 and 1923. On Christmas day 1939 interned Irish Republican prisoners took control of the jail, protesting their continued imprisonment without charges or trials. On 20 March 1943, 21 Irish Republican prisoners tunneled their way out of Derry Jail with the assistance of Jimmy Steele (republican) and Ned Maguire. This escape was referred to as "The Big Derry Jail Escape".

== Timeline ==
- 1620: First gaol constructed at the junction of Butcher Street and the Diamond.
- 1676: Second gaol constructed at Ferryquay Street.
- 1791: Third gaol opens at Bishop Street.
- 1824: Fourth gaol, with unique horseshoe design, opens after four years of construction at a cost of over £33,000
- 31 March 1953: Derry Gaol closes.

== Executions ==
- 1820: John Rainey, John McQuade, and Robert Acheson, highwaymen gang members convicted of the murder of Henry O'Hagan, escape the third gaol while awaiting execution, are recaptured, and hanged in front of the third gaol
- 19 November 1864: Barbara Benett, worked as a sex worker in the local surrounding area during a meeting with one of her lovers he attacked her at which point she stabbed him 5 times consequently killing him and was hanged for her offences at aged 43 also in front of the third gaol.
- 6 January 1893: John Boyle of County Tyrone is hanged after being convicted at Ulster Assizes for the beating death of his wife of 10 years at Aughnacloy
- 5 January 1904: Joseph Moan, convicted as the "Trillick murderer" at the Spring Assizes, is hanged for the murder of Rose McCann while she was on her way home to Badoney
- 20 August 1908: John Berryman is hanged for the murder of his brother and sister-in-law, William Berryman and Jane Turner Berryman, near Garvagh, after the two brothers fell out over shares of a prosperous farm there, and after being convicted at the Londonderry Assizes
- 12 February 1921: James McNulty was arrested and held in solitary confinement for his participation in the detonation of a train bridge near his home in Creeslough, Co. Donegal. He served two years and was released in 1923.
- 8 February 1923: William Rooney is hanged for kicking 21-year-old Gunnings Mill factory worker Lilly Johnston to death in Cookstown, after being convicted at the Ulster Winter Assizes in Belfast

== Folk song ==
"Derry Gaol" is also another title used for the folk song "The Maid Freed from the Gallows"; some versions of the lyrics bemoan that there is "no release" from the Derry Gaol.
