= Charlie McGlade =

Charlie McGlade was a volunteer in the Irish Republican Army (IRA) and later member of the member of the Sinn Féin Ard Chomhairle (executive committee).

Originally from Belfast, McGlade worked as a printer and later moved to Drimnagh in Dublin. McGlade joined the IRA in the late 1920s and by the late 1930s McGlade had become the Quartermaster of the IRAs' Belfast Brigade and was responsible for the creation of the IRAs Northern Command. He was arrested several times for IRA activities and (in 1936) received a two-year sentenced at hard labour. He was released in December 1938 and McGlade was appointed Officer commanding of the Belfast Brigade. McGlade was involved in the planning of the 1939-40 sabotage/ bombing attacks on England - the S-Plan. In June 1941, McGlade arrested the Chief of Staff of the Irish Republican Army, Stephen Hayes, who was accused of being a spy for the Irish Free State government.

In the early 1940s, McGlade was shot and wounded by Special Branch Gardaí in Dublin. This shooting was one of the justifications given by the IRA for the killing of Special Branch Sergeant Denis O'Brien in September 1942. Charlie Kerins was charged with the killing of Sergeant O'Brien. Kerins refused to recognise the authority of the court and was found guilty and hung in Mountjoy Prison on 1 December 1944.

In October 1941, McGlade was interned at Curragh Camp until the conclusion of the Second World War. Upon his release, he re-involved himself in republican activism, eventually siding with the Provisional IRA in the 1969 split in the IRA. Charlie McGlade died on 17 September 1982 and was buried at Glasnevin Cemetery, Dublin.

Military offices
Preceded by Sean McArdle	Officer Commanding the Belfast Battalion of the Irish Republican Army; 1938 – 1940	Succeeded by Jimmy Steele
Preceded by New position	Officer Commanding the IRA Northern Command; 1939 – 1940	Succeeded by Seán McCaughey
