= Patrick Rogers (priest) =

Catholic priest, author and historian

Patrick Rogers was an Irish Roman Catholic priest of the Diocese of Down and Connor, an ecclesiastical historian, author and educationalist. He spent much of his professional life as Principal of St. Joseph's College of Education, a male only teacher training college in Belfast which merged in 1985 to become St. Mary's University College, Belfast.

== Professional life ==
Rogers was born in Rawalpindi, India and educated at St Malachy's College, studying for the priesthood in St. Patrick's College Maynooth and was ordained there in 1929. Having excelled at history he was sent for post graduate study and in 1934 his thesis was published as The Irish Volunteers and Catholic Emancipation 1778 - 1793 with an introduction by Eoin MacNeill

He was appointed to the staff of St. Malachy's College in Belfast and taught history there his appointment as the first principal of St. Joseph's College of Education at Trench House in 1947.

Among the students who passed through the college while Rogers was on the staff, or later still Principal were, Seamus Heaney, Brian Friel, Seamus Mallon, Mickey Harte and the former Chief Executive of Arts Council of Northern Ireland, Brian Ferran.

A flavour of the college in the 1960s, under Rogers, was given in a Canadian account of Heaney teaching there; "it doubled as a cross between a medium secure prison and a Trappist monastery." Another former student recalled him as am "austere man....with a dry sense of humour underneath his uncompromising, strict and forbidding appearance."

Rogers, always a heavy smoker, died in October 1969 and was interred in Priest's Row in Milltown Cemetery.

== Works ==
- The Irish Volunteers and Catholic Emancipation 1778 - 1793 1934
- Old St. Mary's 1941
- Father Theobald Mathew: Apostle of Temperance 1945
- War Diaries - unpublished and retained at St. Malachy's College
