= Public Prosecution Service of Northern Ireland v. Liam Adams =

Irish criminal case, 2009–2013

Public Prosecution Service of Northern Ireland v. Liam Adams was a criminal case relating to allegations of child abuse made in 2009 against Liam Adams, brother of Irish politician Gerry Adams. Liam Adams was found guilty in October 2013 of 10 offences, and was sentenced in November 2013 to 16 years in prison.

== UTV Insight Special ==
In December 2009, a UTV Insight Special programme alleged that Liam Adams had sexually abused his daughter, Áine Tyrell, for a decade. In response, his brother Gerry Adams urged Liam to turn himself in to the police. Gerry also alleged that his deceased father, Gerry Adams, Sr., had subjected family members to emotional, physical and sexual abuse. The Police Service of Northern Ireland issued a European Arrest Warrant for Liam Adams' arrest.

== Extradition request ==
In December 2009, Liam Adams presented himself at a Garda Síochána police station in Sligo. They were not able to arrest him as they did not have the necessary European Arrest Warrant. Adams did not wish to hand himself into police in Northern Ireland, citing unfairness.

On 3 March 2010, the High Court in Dublin endorsed the European Arrest Warrant, which was issued in Liam Adams' name by the Serious Organised Crime Agency. The following day, Adams handed himself over to the authorities in the Republic.

Adams opposed his extradition. At a brief hearing on 21 July, Adams applied for legal aid to help fight the extradition.

On 3 October 2011, an Irish High Court judge in Dublin declined Liam Adams' objections to the extradition request and said he would issue an order for Adams to surrender to the authorities in Northern Ireland. On 18 October 2011, after losing his appeal against extradition, Adams was remanded in custody for 15 days to a Dublin prison. He was handed over to officers from the PSNI at the border on the night of 2 November, and brought to Laganside Magistrates Court on the morning of 3 November, where he was remanded in custody for a week.

== Trials ==
There were two trials; the first collapsed in April 2013 for legal reasons.

=== Verdict ===
In October 2013 Liam Adams was found guilty of ten offences, including rape and gross indecency committed against his daughter between 1977 and 1983 when she was four to nine.

On 27 November 2013, Adams was jailed for 16 years with a further two years probation. He was diagnosed with cancer in 2019 and transferred from HM Prison Maghaberry to a hospice, where he died on 25 February, aged 63.
