= Myles Shevlin =

Myles P. Shevlin (died 1990) was an Irish republican Dublin-based solicitor known as the Provisional Irish Republican Army (IRA) "legal adviser"' Shevlin represented several individuals accused of IRA membership and/or activity. During the IRA border campaign ("Operation Harvest") of the late 1950s, Shevlin was for a time the IRA Adjutant-General and a member of its Army Council. With the outbreak of The Troubles in the late 1960's Shevlin smuggled weapons to the IRA in the north.

On 20 June 1972, he attended and acted as secretary at a meeting of IRA representatives with William Whitelaw, the British Secretary of State for Northern Ireland, in London. The IRA representatives included Gerry Adams, Martin McGuinness, Sean MacStiofain and Dáithí Ó Conaill.

== Death ==
He died at his home in Dublin in 1990.
