= Ned Maguire =

Irish Republican Army volunteer

Ned Maguire (1912 - 11 February 1965) was an Irish Republican Army (IRA) volunteer from Belfast, Quartermaster of the IRA Northern Command and perhaps best known for his part in the Crumlin Road Gaol breakout of 1943. His brother Alfie Maguire was OC of the IRA Northern Command.

Having been sentenced to six years imprisonment, Maguire was with the other IRA prisoners in 'A' Wing, when it was noticed that there was an unused trapdoor in the roof of a toilet block. It was decided that Patrick Donnelly, Hugh McAteer (whose suggestion it had been), Jimmy Steele, and Maguire would escape through this, with the aid of rope ladders fashioned from torn bed sheets and across the prison roof, followed by a second wave led by Joe Cahill. The escape of the first party took place as planned on 15 January 1943. Maguire was in the party because his trade hade been as a roof slater, and Donnelly believed this particular skill would be useful breaking out of the attic and onto the prison roof; it was, therefore, Maguire who removed the slates that enabled the group to get out. Apart from Steele slightly injuring himself, the escape was successful, and Maguire and the others made their way to a North Queen Street safe-house in the staunchly Republican New Lodge district of Belfast. Splitting up, he and Donnelly made their way four days later to Dublin; Maguire did not remain there long, however, as Belfast Brigade had received word of a major tunnelling operation by the Republican prisoners in Derry prison. In order to provide logistical support for such an important escape- which was timed for 21 May- he made his way to Derry. Four months later, he was arrested by the Gardaí in County Donegal. His son, Ned Maguire (jr.), also was involved in a breakout, in Long Kesh in 1974. It was the same escape where Hugh Coney was killed. He successfully escaped but was later recaptured.
