= IRA Northern Command =

Irish Republican Army command division

Northern Command was a command division in the Irish Republican Army (1922–1969) and Provisional IRA, responsible for directing IRA operations in the northern part of Ireland.

== IRA ==
The IRA had difficulty with cross-border communications between Dublin and Belfast after the outbreak of the Second World War, and some northern based members of the IRA believed a self-contained unit was required. Charlie McGlade, a printer from Belfast, was the architect of the idea, and Northern Command was formed in 1939 taking responsibility for IRA operations in the six counties of Northern Ireland and also County Donegal, while Southern Command took responsibility for the other 25 counties of Ireland. By the early 1950s, both Northern Command and Southern Command had faded away, and the leadership of the IRA was southern-based, with all commands being issued from Dublin.

Charlie McGlade became the O/C of the Northern Command, Jimmy Steele became Adjutant, also appointed was Seán McCaughey as Quartermaster. In 1940 McGlade stepped down as O/C of Northern Command and appointed McCaughey to the position.

== Provisional IRA ==
In the mid-1970s a new Northern Command was proposed by Gerry Adams and Ivor Bell, which would cover the six counties of Northern Ireland, and also County Louth, County Cavan, County Monaghan, County Leitrim and County Donegal. These counties were effectively the "war zone" where paramilitary operations were planned and carried out. The role of the IRA Southern Command, covering the remaining 21 counties, would be to provide logistical support for the campaign in the north. Veteran republicans such as Joe Cahill and Billy McKee opposed the idea fearing a split in the movement, but Chief of Staff Seamus Twomey backed the idea and a new Northern Command was formed in late 1976.
