= James McNulty (Irish activist) =

Irish activist

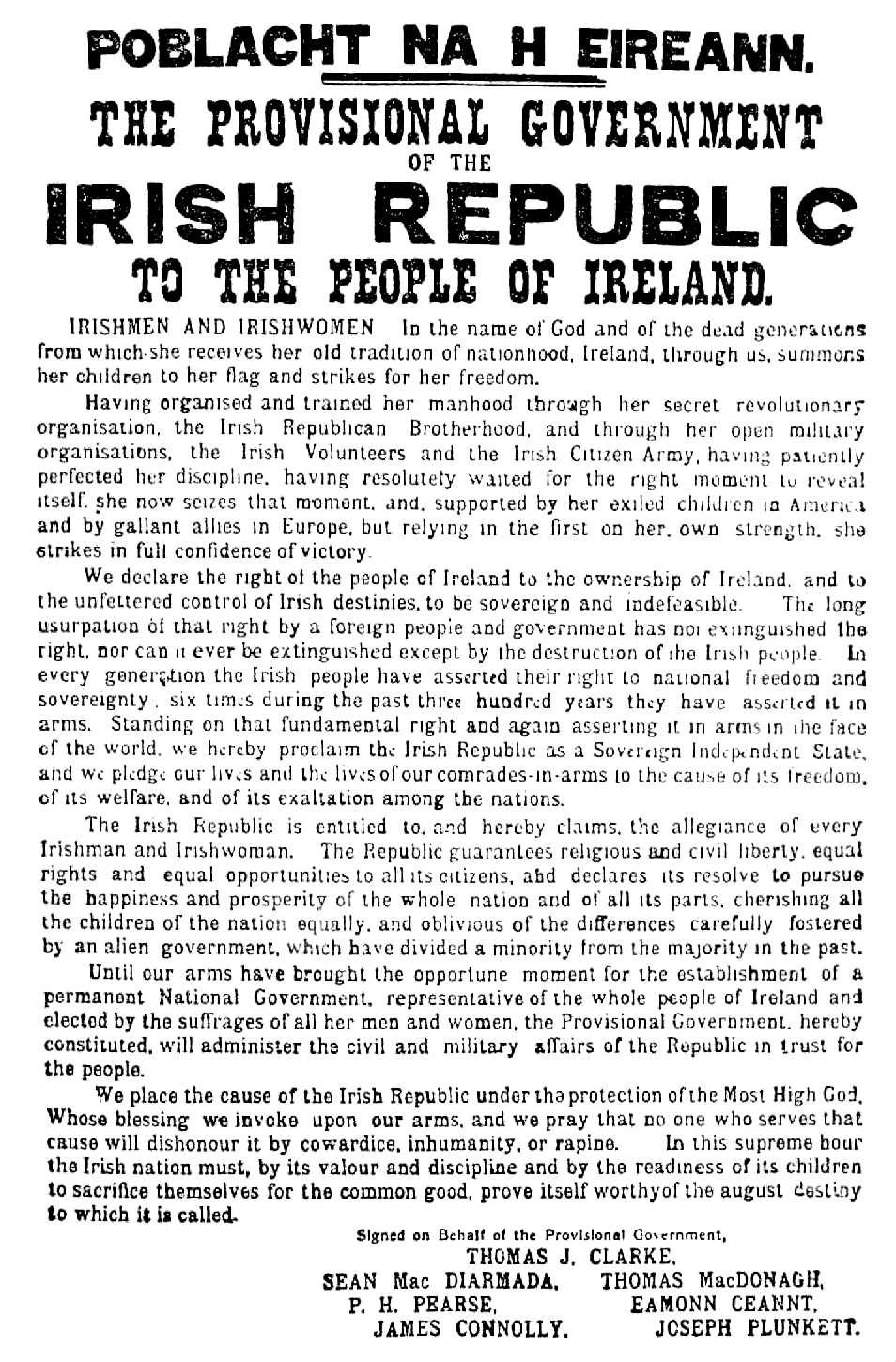
Easter Proclamation of 1916

James McNulty (Irish: Séamus Mac an Ultaigh; 1890–1977) was an activist for Irish independence and served as the commandant of the Doe Battalion of the Irish Volunteers during the 1916 Easter Rising in County Donegal in Ulster, Ireland, and was a stonemason by trade.

== Early life ==
James McNulty was born on January 1, 1890, in Feymore, Creeslough, County Donegal, Ulster, Ireland. James was one of seven children born to Patrick McNulty and Catherine Murray.

== Emigration to the United States and Apprenticeship ==
James McNulty emigrated to the United States in about 1908 to join family members in Philadelphia, PA. He apprenticed as a stonemason with John B. Kelly Sr., US Olympian and the father of actress, Grace Kelly. They often worked together and became lifelong friends.

During his time in Philadelphia, he became interested in Irish politics. In March 1914, McNulty joined the Irish Volunteers and was an active member of the Clan na Gael. He became acquainted with Joseph McGarrity, an important financier for Irish independence, who introduced McNulty to many principal leaders in the cause.

== Return to Ireland and Easter Rising ==
At the request of John Devoy, the leader of the Clan na Gael, and Tom Clarke, the architect of the Easter Rising, McNulty returned to Ireland in 1915, while recovering from typhoid fever He served as a company captain, recruiter, organiser, trainer and the Commandant of the Doe Battalion, County Donegal.

In February 1916, in an effort to improve morale and attract new recruits to the Volunteers, James, along with IRB member Daniel Kelly, organised a rally at Doe Castle at Sheephaven Bay, near Creeslough. Patrick Pearse, the spokesman of the Rising, was scheduled to attend, however the planning of the forthcoming events in Dublin prevented him from travelling at that time. Two months later, on Easter Monday, 24 April 1916, during the Easter Rising, Contrary to instructions from Eoin MacNeill, McNulty and Kelly mobilised a group of 33 men in Creeslough and awaited further orders, which never arrived. Due to poor communication and conflicting commands, the group never mobilised. Although similar groups formed throughout the country, the bulk of the fighting was contained within the city limits of Dublin.

== Continued Activism and Arrest ==
McNulty was also a recruiter and member of the local club of the Sinn Féin political party during this time known as the Irish revolutionary period. Early in 1919, while conducting inspections with the Irish Volunteers, McNulty was shot in the shoulder by Andrew Wilkinson, J.P. (Justice of the Peace) and seriously wounded. Wilkinson had refused to admit McNulty and his group into his home or surrender his weapons. James was initially taken to nearby Carrigart and examined by Dr. McClusky, who ordered for McNulty's immediate transfer to Dublin to have the bullet extracted at the Mater Hospital. He stayed there for an extended amount of time until he was fully recovered.

McNulty remained active in the years following the Rising, known as the "Irish War of Independence". James' knowledge of construction was instrumental with Volunteer attempts to stop the transport of British troops into the region. On 7 February 1921, Volunteers removed a section of the railway line on the train bridge at Drumacart Creeslough. A train carrying British troops was derailed and 15 men were injured, James was consequently arrested on 12 February 1921 by the Royal Irish Constabulary (a.k.a. "The Black and Tans").

He was interned in Derry Prison "Derry Gaol", where he remained for the next two years and was scheduled for execution. On 6 December 1921, the same night as the signing of the Anglo-Irish Treaty, James was one of 14 prisoners involved in a failed escape attempt plotted locally by the Derry IRA., in which two prison guards were killed. In 1923, James was brought to trial and released due to never actually being charged with a crime. Disheartened with the terms of the Anglo-Irish Treaty, James soon departed to the United States with his family.

== Emigration ==
In October 1924, after his release from Derry Gaol, James, his wife, Anne (née Nelis), whom he married in February 1917, soon emigrated to the United States with their children, partly to avoid any retaliation from the British. They sailed to Philadelphia and settled in the Chestnut Hill section of the city. He established a successful stone masonry and construction business. Through the 1930s & 1940s, James worked regularly with John B. Kelly Sr. on several projects in Philadelphia and Washington, D.C. Some of the more notable buildings James worked as a stonemason on are: the Bryn Athyn Cathedral, the Jefferson Memorial, the (US) Treasury Building and The Pentagon.

== Family ==
James and Anne had seven children. One of their daughters, Kathleen Antonelli, was one of the "Refrigerator Ladies", the group of six female computer programmers who helped to operate the first electronic general-purpose computer, ENIAC in the 1940s and 1950s in Philadelphia.

== Death ==
James McNulty returned to Ireland to live in Creeslough following his wife's death in 1966. He died on 5 February 1977 at the age of 87 in his native Creeslough, County Donegal. At his request, his body was returned to Philadelphia to be buried with his wife.
