= Patrick Donnelly (Irish republican) =

Irish Republican Army volunteer

Patrick Donnelly was an Irish Republican Army volunteer, perhaps best known for his part in the Crumlin Road Gaol breakout of 1943.

Having been sentenced to twelve years imprisonment, Donnelly was Officer Commanding the IRA prisoners in 'A' Wing, when it was noticed that there was an unused trapdoor in the roof of a toilet block. It was decided that Donnelly, along with Hugh McAteer (whose suggestion it had been), Jimmy Steele, and Ned Maguire would escape through this, with the aid of rope ladders fashioned from torn bed sheets and across the prison roof, followed by a second wave led by Joe Cahill. The escape of the first party took place as planned on 15 January 1943. When they found that their home-made grappling hook was too short for the external wall, and two members of the escape party began arguing over whose responsibility it had been, it was Donnelly who supposedly advised sardonically that they should finish the argument 'the other side of the wall.' The escape was successful, and Donnelly and the others made their way to a North Queen Street safe-house in the staunchly Republican New Lodge district of Belfast. Splitting up, he made his way four days later to Dublin, and notwithstanding a reward on his head for £3,000, he avoided recapture for the rest of the Second World War.
