= Seán McCaughey =

Irish militant and Republican activist

- Seán Mac Eachaidh
- Born: 8 June 1915; Aughnacloy, County Tyrone, Ireland
- Died: 11 May 1946 (aged 30); Portlaoise Prison, County Laois, Ireland
- Cause of death: Hunger strike
- Organization: Irish Republican Army (1922–1969)
- Known for: Hunger/thirst strike of 23 days, from 19 April 1946

Seán McCaughey (Irish: Seán Mac Eóchaidh) (8 June 1915 – 11 May 1946) was an Irish militant and Republican activist. He was an Irish Republican Army (IRA) leader in the 1930s and 1940s and hunger striker.

== Background ==
McCaughey was born in Aughnacloy, County Tyrone in 1915 and in 1921 his family moved to Ardoyne district in north Belfast. McCaughey's father was a founding member of the Irish Republican Dungannon Clubs and organized the first branch of Sinn Féin in Tyrone. As a teenager McCaughy joined the Gaelic League and Sinn Féin and also became a long time student and teacher of the Irish language in the Glens of Antrim. McCaughey joined the IRA in 1935 and in 1938 was promoted to Officer commanding (O/C) of its Northern Command, headquartered near the town of Carrickmore, County Tyrone (which was the ancestral home of Joseph McGarrity and Patrick McCartan both leaders of the Irish republican organization Clan na Gael). In December 1939 McCaughy was arrested and imprisoned at the Curragh Camp, being released in 1940 he returned to the Northern Command of the IRA. McCaughey was held in high regard and was considered to be one of the best officers of the northern IRA. At the time of his arrest in Rathmines, Dublin on 2 September 1941 he was acting Chief of Staff.

== Military Trial, Imprisonment and Death ==
In September 1941 he was found guilty by a Dublin court of having detained and assaulted Stephen Hayes, IRA Chief of Staff who was accused of being a spy for the Irish Free State government. Hayes escaped and later testified against McCaughey at a Military Court. McCaughey was sentenced to death by firing squad. His sentence was commuted to a life sentence of penal servitude.

Imprisoned in Portlaoise Prison (24 July 1941), McCaughey joined other IRA prisoners in the ongoing strip strike. Refusing to wear a criminal's prison clothes, he was kept in solitary confinement and spent nearly five years naked except for a blanket. This form of resistance by Irish Republican prisoners was used in the 1980s Blanket protest in the Maze prison (also known as "Long Kesh") and the HM Prison Armagh (women's prison) in Northern Ireland. McCaughey and other Irish Republican prisoners endured years of hardships: "Sitting month after month, year after year in bleak solitary cells, they were taken out once a week for a bath, and for the rest of the week lived the life of an animal trapped in a burrow...That they did not go mad is a remarkable comment on mans capacity for survival." During his almost five years in Portlaoise McCaughey was never permitted to have visitors.

McCaughey commenced a hunger strike on 19 April 1946. After 10 days, he stopped taking water and died on 11 May 1946, the twenty-third day of his protest. An inquest was held in the prison at which the prison doctor admitted that during his over four and a half years of imprisonment that McCaughey had never been allowed out in the fresh air or sunlight and that "he would not treat his dog the way Seán McCaughey had been treated in Portlaoise."

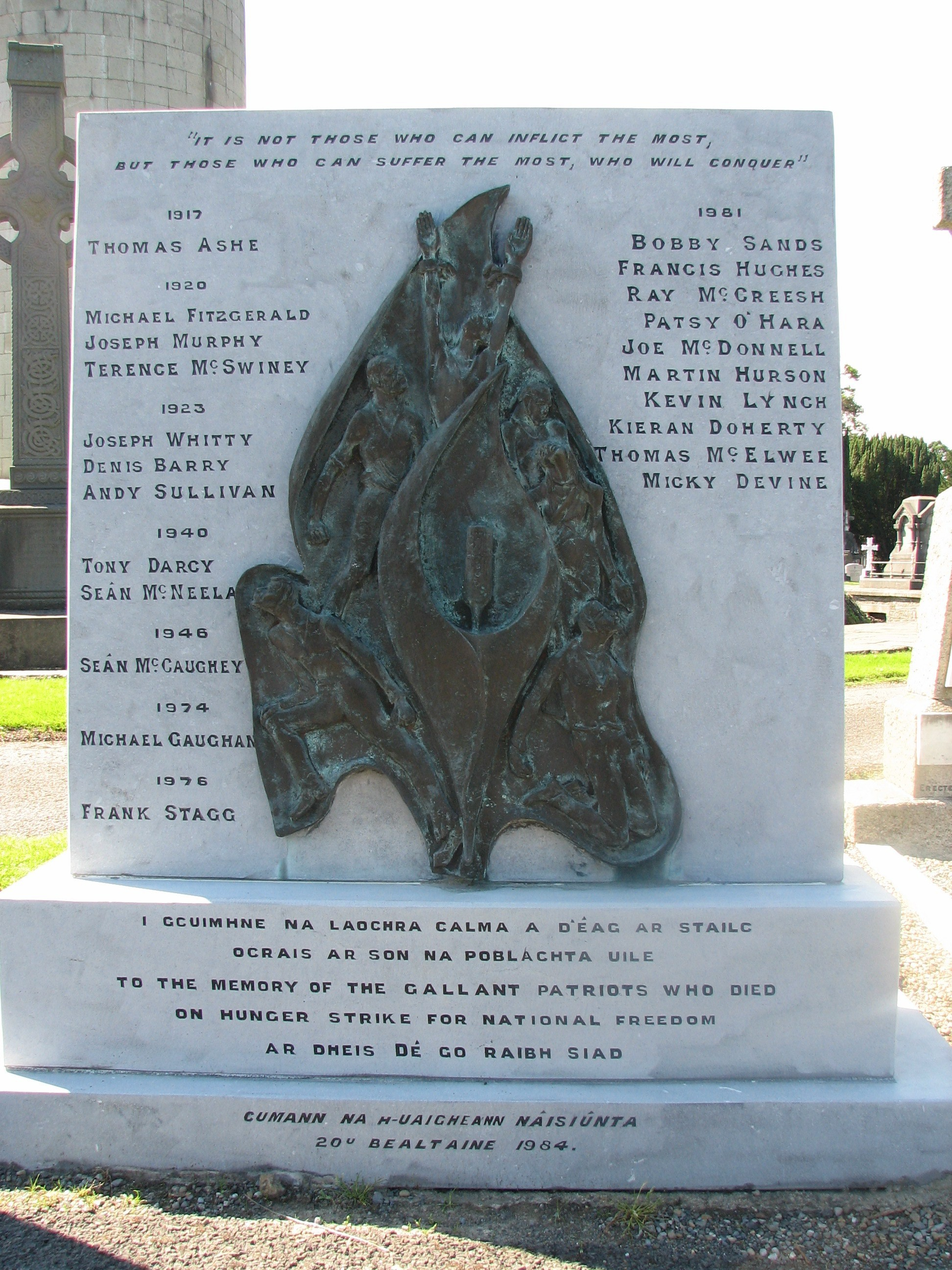
Hunger Strike Memorial in Dublin's Glasnevin Cemetery

Sean McCaughey's funeral cortege passed through large crowds in the streets of Dublin and proceeded north to Belfast where it was met by thousands of mourners at Holy Cross Church, Ardoyne. McCaughey was buried in a family grave in Milltown Cemetery, which is under the care of the National Graves Association, Belfast.

== Irish Hunger Strikes ==
Seán McCaughey was the last person to die on hunger strike in the Irish state. There is a long history of hunger striking in Ireland - within the 20th century a total of 22 Irish republicans died on hunger strike with survivors suffering long-term health and psychological effects. Four men died during the 1920 Cork hunger strike. The largest hunger strike in Irish history was the 1923 Irish Hunger Strikes, five men died during that hunger strike. Ten men died during the 1981 Irish hunger strike.

== Sources ==
- "McCaughey's Doom". Time Magazine. 29 September 1941. Archived from the original on 3 June 2008., Time Magazine, 29 September 1941.
- National Graves Association
- Sean McCaughey song
- SEAN McCAUGHEY mp3
- Biting at the Grave, O'Malley, Padraig, Beacon Press, Boston 1990 ISBN 0-8070-0208-9
- Flynn, Barry (2011). Pawns in the Game. Cork: Collins Press. ISBN 978-1-848891-16-6.
- Thorne, Kathleen (2019). Echoes of Their Footsteps. Oregon: Generation Organization. ISBN 978-0-692-04283-0.

Military offices
Preceded by Charlie McGlade	Officer Commanding the IRA Northern Command; 1940 – 1941	Succeeded by ?
