= Gerry Adams Sr. =

Irish Republican Army member

Gerard Adams Sr.
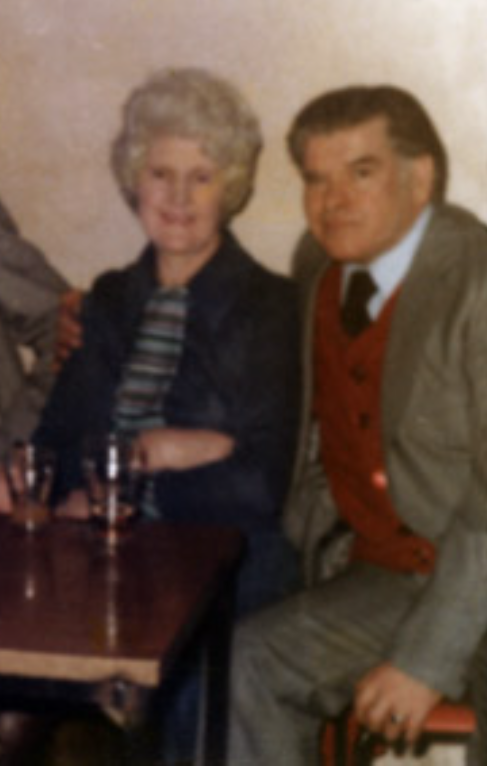
- Born: 1926; Belfast, Northern Ireland
- Died: 17 November 2003 (aged 76–77)
- Occupation: Belfast Irish Republican Army
- Spouse: Annie Hannaway
- Children: 13; including Gerry

Gerard Adams Sr. (1926 – 17 November 2003) was an Irish Republican Army (IRA) volunteer who took part in its Northern campaign in the 1940s. He has been described as "important in the emergence of the Provisional IRA in 1970".

Adams was captured after being shot and wounded during an IRA operation in 1942 after he shot a Royal Ulster Constabulary police officer in the foot. He was sentenced to eight years in prison and served five. While in jail Adams took part in a "strip strike" from June to September 1943. This type of prisoner strike became known as the Blanket protest of the 1970s–80s. He was interned in 1971 along with his son, Gerry Adams.

He married Anne Hannaway, also a Republican from an established republican family, with whom he had thirteen children (three of whom died in infancy). His children include Gerry Adams, who became a leading figure in Sinn Féin and was its president until 2018, as well as a former abstentionist MP for Belfast West and former TD. Another son, Liam Adams, died while serving a prison sentence in Northern Ireland for sexually abusing his daughter.

He died on 17 November 2003, "a lonely old man". He was buried with the Irish tricolour, despite the private reservations of family members over alleged abuse that would only be made public some years later. His son Gerry Adams said that he felt his father had 'besmirched' the flag.

In December 2009, six years after his death, his family claimed that he had subjected some members of his family to emotional, physical and sexual abuse over many years. The family said that this abuse "had a devastating impact" on them, with which they were still coming to terms. The family said that they had revealed the abuse in order to help other families in similar circumstances.
