= Milltown Cemetery =

Cemetery in west Belfast, Northern Ireland

- The entrance to Milltown Cemetery: 546 Falls Road
- Interactive map of Milltown Cemetery

Details
- Established: 1869
- Location: West Belfast
- Coordinates: 54°34′57″N 5°58′25″W
- Style: Primarily Irish Roman Catholic funerary art
- Size: 55 acres (220,000 m^{2})
- No. of graves: 50,000
- No. of interments: 200,000
- Find a Grave: Milltown Cemetery

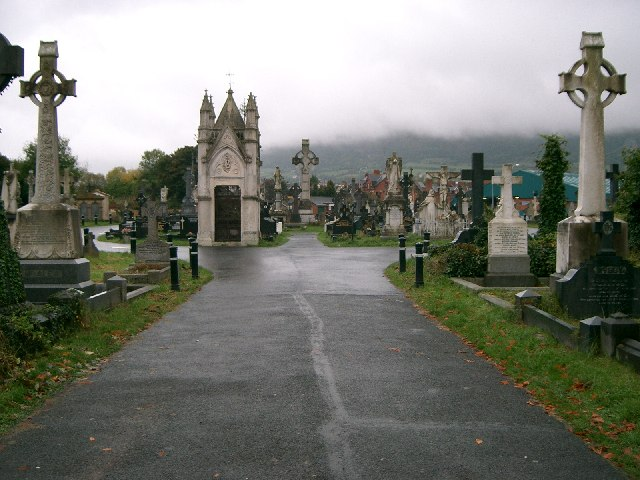
Milltown Cemetery

Milltown Cemetery (Irish: Reilig Bhaile an Mhuilinn) is a cemetery in west Belfast, Northern Ireland. It lies within the townland of Ballymurphy, between the Falls Road and the M1 motorway.

== History ==
Milltown Cemetery opened in 1869 as part of the broader provision of services for the city of Belfast's expanding Catholic population. The cemetery was an important development in the episcopal reign of Bishop Patrick Dorrian of the Diocese of Down and Connor.

Although the cemetery's history and story is often presented as a nationalist and Irish Republican site, in fact the overwhelming majority of the approximately 200,000 of Belfast dead who are buried there were ordinary Catholics, many in unmarked graves.

Within the cemetery there are three large sections of open space, each about the size of a football pitch, designated as "poor ground". Over 80,000 people are buried in the cemetery's poor grounds, many of whom died in the flu pandemic of 1919. Since 2007, the 55-acre (220,000 m^{2}) cemetery has undergone extensive work, reversing years of neglect.

== Republicanism ==
The cemetery has, for some, become synonymous with Irish republicanism. Irish Republican Army prisoner Bobby Sands, who died on hunger strike on 5 May 1981, is buried in the cemetery. Fellow hunger-strikers Kieran Doherty, Joe McDonnell and Pat McGeown (who died of a heart attack in 1996) are also buried there. In total, 77 IRA volunteers are buried in what is known as the 'New Republican Plot', and 34 volunteers are buried in what is known as the County Antrim Memorial Plot, which was used between 1969 and 1972. Throughout the cemetery, many more IRA volunteers are buried in family graves. These include Tom Williams, who was executed in Crumlin Road Prison on 2 September 1942. Williams' body lay in a prison grave until January 2000, when a campaign by the National Graves Association, Belfast to have his remains re-interred in Milltown was successful. Members of the INLA, IPLO and Workers' Party are also buried there.

The cemetery was the scene of the Milltown Cemetery attack on 16 March 1988, when loyalist Michael Stone attacked a funeral, killing three mourners as IRA volunteers Dan McCann, Seán Savage and Mairéad Farrell were being buried. All three had been killed by members of the SAS at Gibraltar during Operation Flavius.

== Graves ==
Harbinson Plot
William Harbinson, a Fenian, died on 9 September 1867 while interned in Belfast Prison and was buried at Portmore, Ballinderry. In 1912, a Celtic cross was erected to his memory, and that of other republicans who were imprisoned in County Antrim jails, in Milltown cemetery. This plot contains the remains of 5 IRA volunteers:
- Joe McKelvey, Liam Mellows, Richard Barrett (Irish republican), often called Dick Barrett, and Rory O'Connor (Irish republican) were captured when Free State forces attacked the Four Courts in Dublin. Without charge or trial, on 8 December 1922, they were executed by firing squad. In 1924, McKelvey was re-interred in Milltown.
- Sean McCartney was shot dead while engaging in paramilitary activities on 8 May 1921 in the Lappinduff Mountains, County Cavan. He was a member of a Belfast Flying Column which operated there.
- Terence Perry, in 1939, as part of the IRA's Expeditionary Force, volunteered for paramilitary activities in England. Captured, he was imprisoned in Parkhurst Prison, where he died on 7 July 1942.
- Sean Gaffney, an IRA volunteer, was imprisoned on the prison ship HMS Al Rawdah, moored at Strangford Lough. On 18 November 1940, he died while still in prison.
- Seamus "Rocky" Burns, while interned, escaped from Derry jail. He was in Belfast when he was shot by RUC personnel in Castle Street. He died on 12 February 1944.

County Antrim Memorial Plot
Unveiled on the 50th anniversary of the Easter Rising, the plot honours the county's republican dead. 34 IRA volunteers who died while involved in paramilitary activity during the late 1960s and early 1970s are buried there.

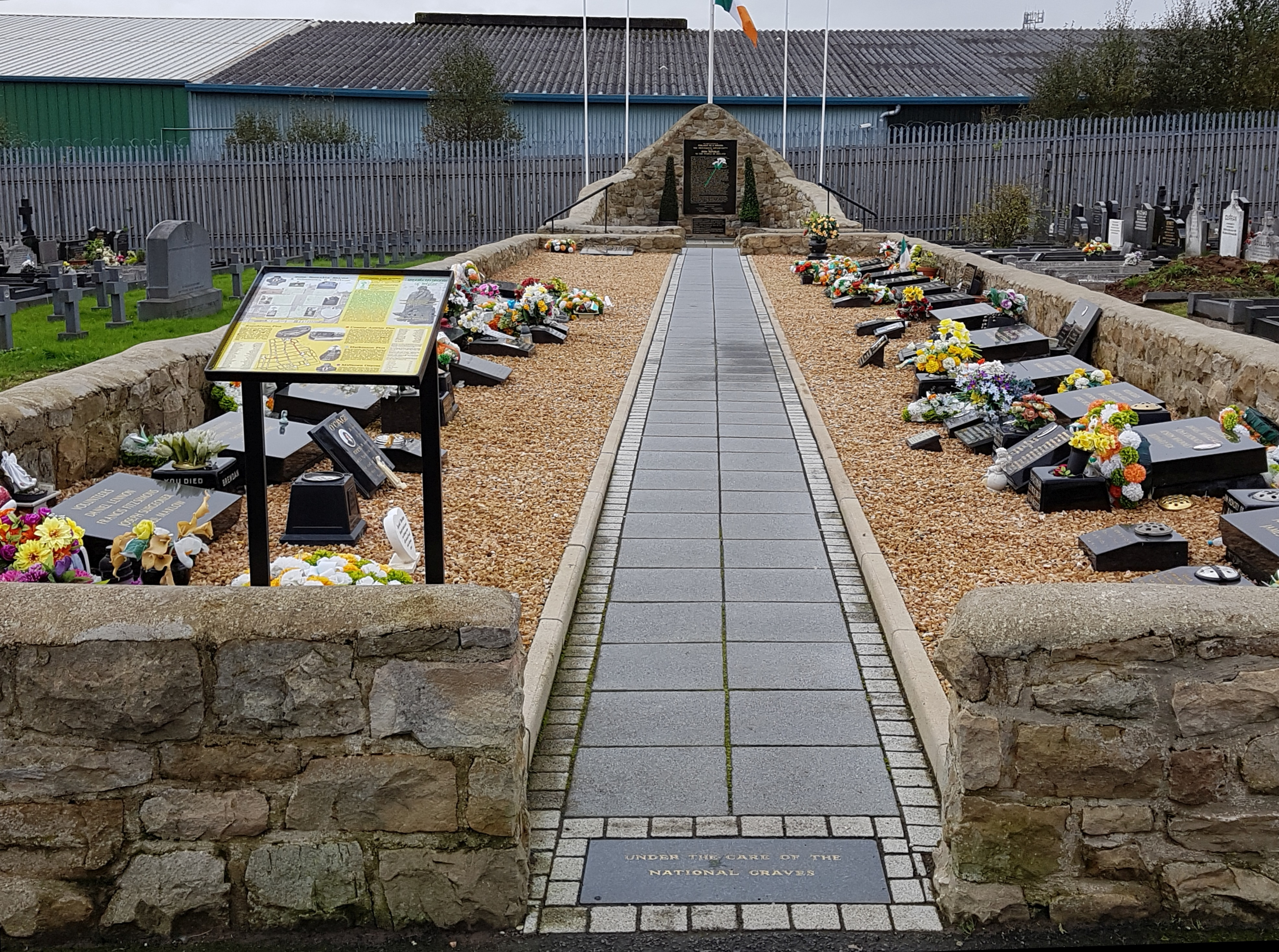
New Republican Plot

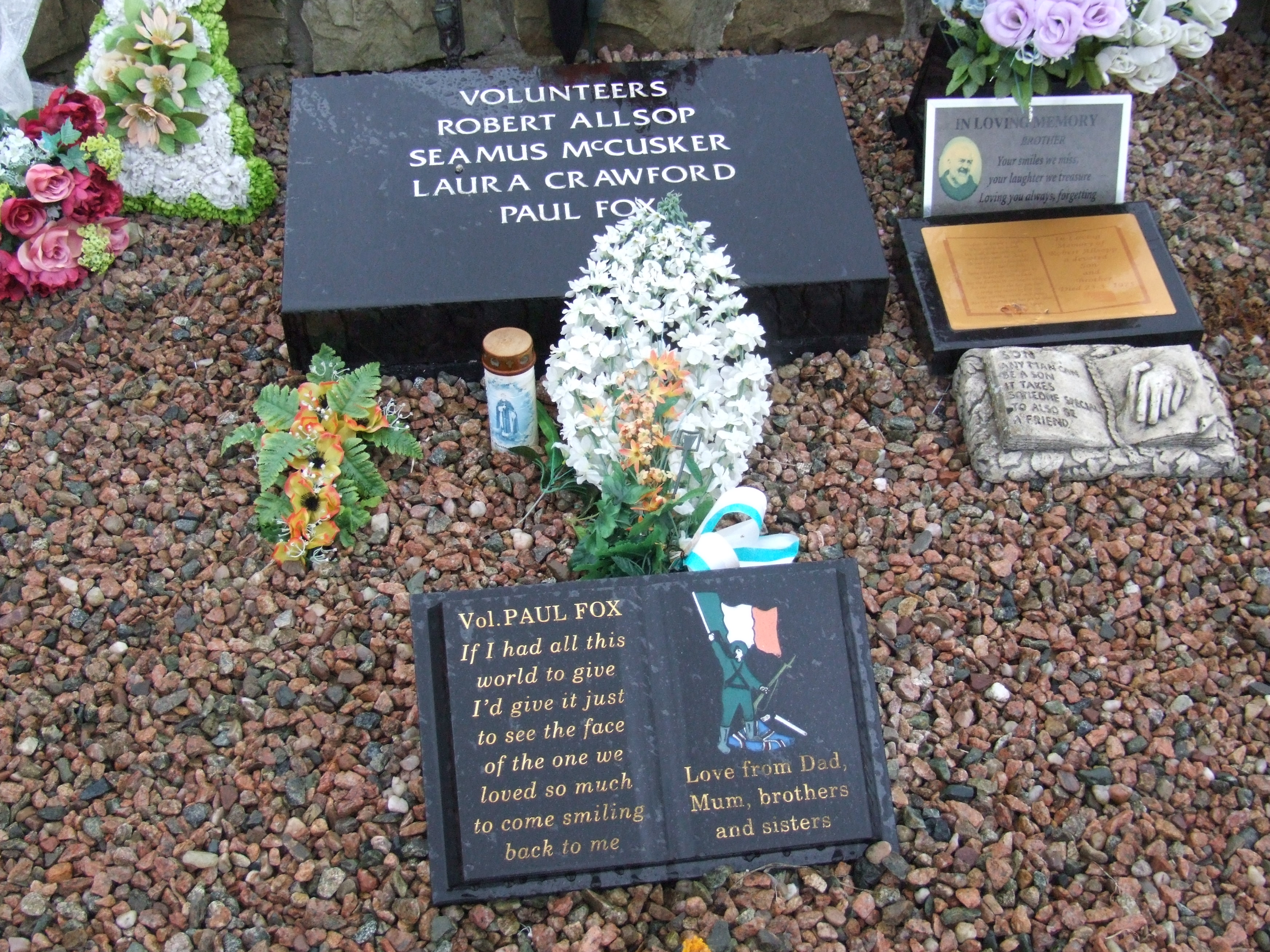
New Republican Plot: marker for a grave with four burials, surrounded by private memorials to those interred here

New Republican Plot
In 1972, the National Graves Association purchased the ground which would become the New Republican Plot. It has space for 46 graves, each to accommodate four burials (allowing for a total of 184 coffins to be buried). The first burials here took place in July of that year. This plot contains the remains of 77 IRA Volunteers who have died while engaging in paramilitary activities or as a result of imprisonment or assassination, not only in Belfast but those killed as far away as Gibraltar. Here are buried those volunteers who died as a result of hunger striking.

Winifred Carney Grave

Winifred Carney, a lifelong socialist (died 21 November 1943), was a member of the Irish Citizen Army and Cumann na mBan. In 1916, during the Easter Rising, she was secretary to Commadante James Connolly and the last woman to leave the G.P.O.

Sean McCaughey Grave

INLA Plot
The INLA Plot contains the remains of ten members of the Irish National Liberation Army.

== Priest's Row ==
Another significant section of the cemetery, facing onto the Andersonstown Road is the plot where many senior Catholic clerics, important educational, social and cultural figures in post-Partition Northern Ireland, are buried. Many of the graves are adorned with high Celtic crosses. There are over two dozen priests of the Diocese of Down and Connor buried here almost all of them with strong pastoral and familial links to West Belfast. Among the most prominent are:

- Bishop Daniel Mageean
- Canon James Clenaghan, the grave inscription is entirely in Irish reflecting his cultural interests. Former President St. Malachy's College
- Canon Patrick Rogers D.Litt., MRIA, principal of Trench House/ St Joseph's College of Education, forerunner of St Mary's University College, Belfast
- Monsignor Dean Frank Kerr, PP St Malachy's Church, Belfast – brother of Fr Hugo Kerr, after whom Hugo St is named
- Rev John A MacLaverty, Adm St. Peter's Cathedral, Belfast died 1943
- Canon Patrick McGouran, PP Sacred Heart, Belfast – a nephew of Bishop Daniel Mageean and a former chaplain to those interned on HMS Argenta in 1923 while a teacher at St Malachy's College
- Monsignor Arthur H Ryan, PP St. Brigid's, Belfast
- Fr John McCaughan BCL, PP St Paul's Belfast, former President St. Malachy's College, died 1939
- An tAthair Roibeard Fullerton, who led the Gaelic League & Irish language revival across Ulster, inscription entirely in Irish
- Monsignor Dean Gerard Montague DD, PP St Paul's Belfast, died 1994

== War graves ==
The Commonwealth War Graves Commission maintains and registers the graves within the cemetery of British Commonwealth service personnel, covering years 1914–21 and 1939–47. There are 102 World War I and 52 World War II graves, besides 10 foreign national servicemen. The focal point is a Cross of Sacrifice erected by the commission after World War I, near which stands a Screen Wall memorial listing those of that war whose graves could not be individually marked.

=== Belfast Blitz Memorial ===
The Belfast Blitz occurred in the April and May 1941 when approximately 1,000 residents were killed. After the burials of those who could be identified, the city authorities were left with human remains where positive identification was not possible. It was decided to have two mass burial sites, one at the City Cemetery and one at Milltown where 30 unknown people, who bore effects identifying them as Catholics, are buried. In 2012 the memorial was restored.
