= Charlie Kerins =

Irish Republican Army (1918-1944)

- Cathal Ó Céirín
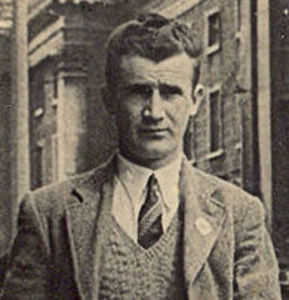

Chief of Staff of the IRA
- In office October 1942 – 16 June 1944
- Preceded by: Hugh McAteer
- Succeeded by: Harry White

Personal details
- Born: 23 January 1918 Caherina, Tralee, County Kerry, Ireland
- Died: 1 December 1944 (aged 26) Mountjoy Prison, Dublin, Ireland

Military service
- Branch/service: Irish Republican Army (1922–1969)
- Criminal information
- Status: Executed by hanging
- Conviction: Murder
- Penalty: Death

Charlie Kerins (Irish: Cathal Ó Céirín; 23 January 1918 – 1 December 1944) was a physical force Irish Republican, and Chief of Staff of the Irish Republican Army (IRA). Kerins was one of six IRA men who were executed by the Irish State between September 1940 and December 1944. After spending two years on the run he was captured by the police (the Gardaí) in 1944. Following his subsequent trial and conviction for the 1942 murder of Garda Detective Sergeant Denis O'Brien, Kerins was hanged at Mountjoy Prison in Dublin.

== Early life ==
Kerins was born in Caherina, Tralee, County Kerry, Ireland and attended Balloonagh Mercy Convent School and then the Christian Brothers School, Edward Street. At the age of 13, he won a Kerry County Council scholarship and completed his secondary education at the Green Christian Brothers and the Jeffers Institute. In 1930, Kerins passed the Intermediate Certificate with honours and the matriculation examination to the National University of Ireland. He later did a commercial course and took up employment in a radio business in Tralee.

Kerins was also active in the Gaelic Athletic Association and in 1939 won a county medal in football with his local team, O'Rahilly's, now renamed Kerins O'Rahilly's in his honour. A small park in Tralee, County Kerry is named in Kerins honour.

== Background and IRA Activities ==
At the time, the Fianna Fáil Government of Éamon de Valera was determined to preserve Irish neutrality during World War II. The IRA's ongoing bombing/sabotage campaign in England (the S-Plan), its attacks against targets in Northern Ireland and its ties to the intelligence services of Nazi Germany were regarded as severe threats to Ireland's national security. According to historian Tim Pat Coogan, "An iron gloved approach to the I.R.A. was the order of the day with vigorous raids and interrogations. As a result, relations between individual I.R.A. men and the Irish Special Branch became understandably strained, and the I.R.A., in its shattered and disorganised condition, came to regard the Special Branch as a greater enemy than the British Crown." During this time many IRA men who were captured by the Gardaí were interned for the duration of the war by the Irish Army in the Curragh Camp, County Kildare.

After leaving school in the 1930s Charlie Kerins joined the IRA, by the start of World War II Kerins held a senior position in the organisation and in July 1940 was appointed deputy chief of staff of the IRA. In May 1942 Kerins was assigned to the IRAs General Headquarters staff.

== Shooting of Detective Sergeant O'Brien ==
On the morning of 9 September 1942, Garda Detective Sergeant Denis O'Brien was leaving his home in Ballyboden, Dublin. He was between his front gate and his car when he was cut down with Thompson submachine guns. D.S. O'Brien, an Anti-Treaty veteran of the Irish Civil War, had enlisted in the Garda Síochána in 1933. He was one of the most effective Detectives of the Special Branch Division (Special Detective Unit, also known as the Broy Harriers), which had its headquarters at Dublin Castle.

According to historian Tim Pat Coogan, "The shooting greatly increased public feeling against the I.R.A., particularly as the murder was carried out in full view of his wife. As she held her dying husband, she watched his assailants cycling past."

== Arrest ==
Following the arrest of Hugh McAteer in October 1942, Kerins was named Chief of Staff of the IRA. Despite a massive manhunt by Gardaí, Kerins remained at large for just under two years.

On 1 July 1943, Charlie Kerins, alongside fellow militants Archie Doyle and Jackie Griffith arrived on bikes at the gates of Player Wills factory on the South Circular Road, Dublin. With scarves around their faces, they stopped the van carrying £5,000 for wages and gunpoint, and drove away with both the van and the money, which was used to finance the IRA's operations.

Travel author Dervla Murphy recounts in her book on Northern Ireland, A Place Apart that Kerins stayed at her family's County Waterford home for two weeks while he was on the run, having given his name as Pat Carney. He had been sent to the Murphy's by Dervla's aunt, Dr. Kathleen Farrell, who was a staunch IRA supporter, and Dervla (aged 12 at the time) and Kerins struck up a friendship. Several months after Kerins left the Murphy's, he was captured.

Kerins had previously left papers and guns hidden at Kathleen Farrell's house in the Dublin suburb of Rathmines. He telephoned the house, as he intended to retrieve them. However, Dr. Farrell's telephone had been tapped by the Gardaí. On 15 June 1944, Kerins was arrested in an early morning raid. He was sleeping when the Gardaí entered his bedroom and did not have an opportunity to reach the Thompson submachine gun which was hidden under his bed.

== Trial ==
At a trial before the Special Criminal Court in Collins Barracks, Dublin, Kerins was formally charged on 2 October 1944 for the "shooting at Rathfarnham of Detective Dinny O'Brien". Kerins refused to recognise the authority of the court and in doing so lost the right to challenge evidence and to present any defence. According to Coogan, "At the end of his trial, the president of the Military Court delayed sentence until later in the day to allow Kerins, if he wished, to make an application whereby he might have avoided the capital sentence. When the court resumed, Kerins said: 'You could have adjourned it for six years as far as I am concerned, as my attitude towards this Court will always be the same."

== Execution ==
Despite legal moves initiated by Seán MacBride, public protests, and parliamentary intervention by TDs from Clann na Talmhan, Labour, and Independent Oliver J. Flanagan in Leinster House, the Fianna Fáil government of Éamon de Valera refused to issue a reprieve. On 1 December 1944 in Mountjoy Prison, Kerins was hanged by British chief executioner Albert Pierrepoint, who was employed by the Irish Government for such occasions. The Governor of Mountjoy paid Kerins the following grim tribute: "He was the bravest man I ever saw die by hanging...I admired Charlie Kerins for his courage and his idealism and never more than during the moments before his death when he stood at attention on the scaffold and submitted himself to the hands of his executioners."

Kerins was the last IRA member to be executed in Éire. He was buried in the prison yard. In September 1948, his remains were exhumed and released to his family. As he made his final journey home large crowds gathered in towns and villages all along the road from Dublin. Charlie Kerins, the boy from Tralee and Chief of Staff of the Irish Republican Army was finally laid to rest in his native Tralee. He is buried in the Republican Plot at Rath Cemetery, Tralee, County Kerry.

The rebel song 'The Boy from Tralee' by Brian O'Higgins is about Kerins and his execution.

== Notes ==
=== Sources ===
- Charlie Kerins. The 50th anniversary commemoration of the execution of Charlie Kerins, Charlie Kerins Memorial Committee (Tralee), 1994.
- Tim Pat Coogan, The IRA: A History, Roberts Rhinehart Publishers, 1994.
