= Gerry Adams =

Irish republican politician (born 1948)

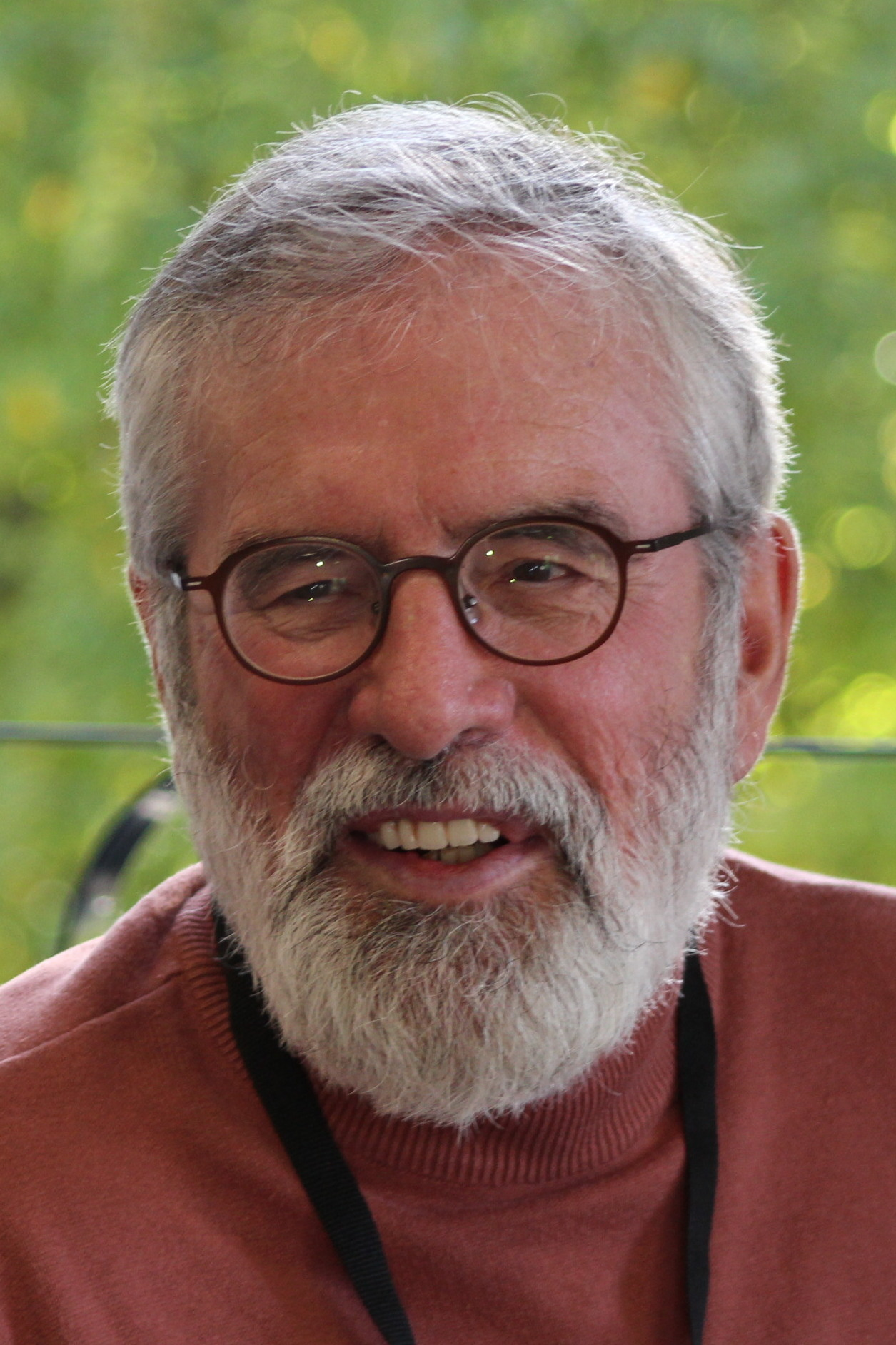
- Adams in 2022

President of Sinn Féin
- In office 13 November 1983 – 10 February 2018
- Vice President: Phil Flynn; John Joe McGirl; Pat Doherty; Mary Lou McDonald
- Preceded by: Ruairí Ó Brádaigh
- Succeeded by: Mary Lou McDonald

Leader of Sinn Féin in Dáil Éireann
- In office 9 March 2011 – 10 February 2018
- Preceded by: Caoimhghín Ó Caoláin
- Succeeded by: Mary Lou McDonald

Teachta Dála for Louth
- In office February 2011 – February 2020

Member of the Legislative Assembly for Belfast West
- In office 25 June 1998 – 7 December 2010
- Preceded by: Constituency established
- Succeeded by: Pat Sheehan

Member of Parliament for Belfast West
- In office 1 May 1997 – 26 January 2011
- Preceded by: Joe Hendron
- Succeeded by: Paul Maskey
- In office 9 June 1983 – 16 March 1992
- Preceded by: Gerry Fitt
- Succeeded by: Joe Hendron

Personal details
- Born: Gerard Adams; 6 October 1948 (age 78) Belfast, Northern Ireland
- Party: Sinn Féin
- Spouse: Collette McArdle (m. 1971)
- Children: 1
- Parent: Gerry Adams Sr. (father)
- Education: St. Mary's CBS, Belfast

Gerard Adams (Irish: Gearóid Mac Ádhaimh; born 6 October 1948) is an Irish republican retired politician who was the president of Sinn Féin from 1983 to 2018. He was a Teachta Dála for Louth from 2011 to 2020 and a Member of the Northern Ireland Legislative Assembly for Belfast West. From 1983 to 1992 and from 1997 to 2011, he was the Member of Parliament for the Belfast West constituency, but followed the Sinn Féin policy of abstentionism in the UK Parliament.

Adams became involved in Irish republicanism in the late 1960s, and was an established figure in Irish activism for more than a decade before his 1983 election to Parliament. In 1984, Adams was seriously wounded in an assassination attempt by the Ulster Defence Association. From the late 1980s onwards, he was an important figure in the Northern Ireland peace process, entering into talks initially with Social Democratic and Labour Party (SDLP) leader John Hume and then subsequently with the Irish and British governments. In 1986, he convinced Sinn Féin to change its traditional policy of abstentionism towards the Oireachtas, the parliament of the Republic of Ireland. In 1998, it also took seats in the power-sharing Northern Ireland Assembly. In 2005, the Provisional Irish Republican Army (IRA) stated that its armed campaign was over and that it was exclusively committed to peaceful politics.

Adams has often been accused of being a member of the IRA leadership in the 1970s and 1980s. He has consistently denied any involvement. In 2014, he was held for four days by the Police Service of Northern Ireland for questioning in connection with the 1972 abduction and murder of Jean McConville. He was released without charge and a file was sent to the Public Prosecution Service for Northern Ireland, which later stated there was insufficient evidence to charge him.

Adams announced in November 2017 that he would step down as leader of Sinn Féin in 2018, and that he would not stand for re-election to his seat in Dáil Éireann in 2020. He was succeeded by Mary Lou McDonald at a special ardfheis (party conference) on 10 February 2018.

== Early life ==
Adams was born in the Ballymurphy district of Belfast on 6 October 1948 to a "strongly republican family". His parents, Anne (née Hannaway) and Gerry Adams Sr., came from republican backgrounds. His grandfather, also named Gerry Adams, was a member of the Irish Republican Brotherhood (IRB) during the Irish War of Independence. Adams is one of thirteen children born to Annie and Gerry Adams Sr. His siblings include Margaret, Paddy, Anne, Frances, Liam, Sean, Maura, Deirdre and Dominic, as well as three siblings who died in infancy. Two of his uncles, Dominic and Patrick Adams, had been interned by the governments in Belfast and Dublin. In J. Bowyer Bell's book The Secret Army, Bell states that Dominic was a senior figure in the Irish Republican Army (IRA) of the mid-1940s. Gerry Adams Sr. joined the IRA at age 16. In 1942, he participated in an IRA ambush on a Royal Ulster Constabulary (RUC) patrol but was shot, arrested and sentenced to eight years' imprisonment. Adams's maternal great-grandfather, Michael Hannaway, was also a member of the IRB during its bombing campaign in England in the 1860s and 1870s. Michael's son, Billy, was election agent for Éamon de Valera at the 1918 general election in West Belfast.

Adams attended St Finian's Primary School on Falls Road, where he was taught by La Salle brothers. Having passed the eleven-plus exam in 1960, he attended St Mary's Christian Brothers Grammar School. He left St Mary's with six O-levels and worked in bars.

== Early political career ==
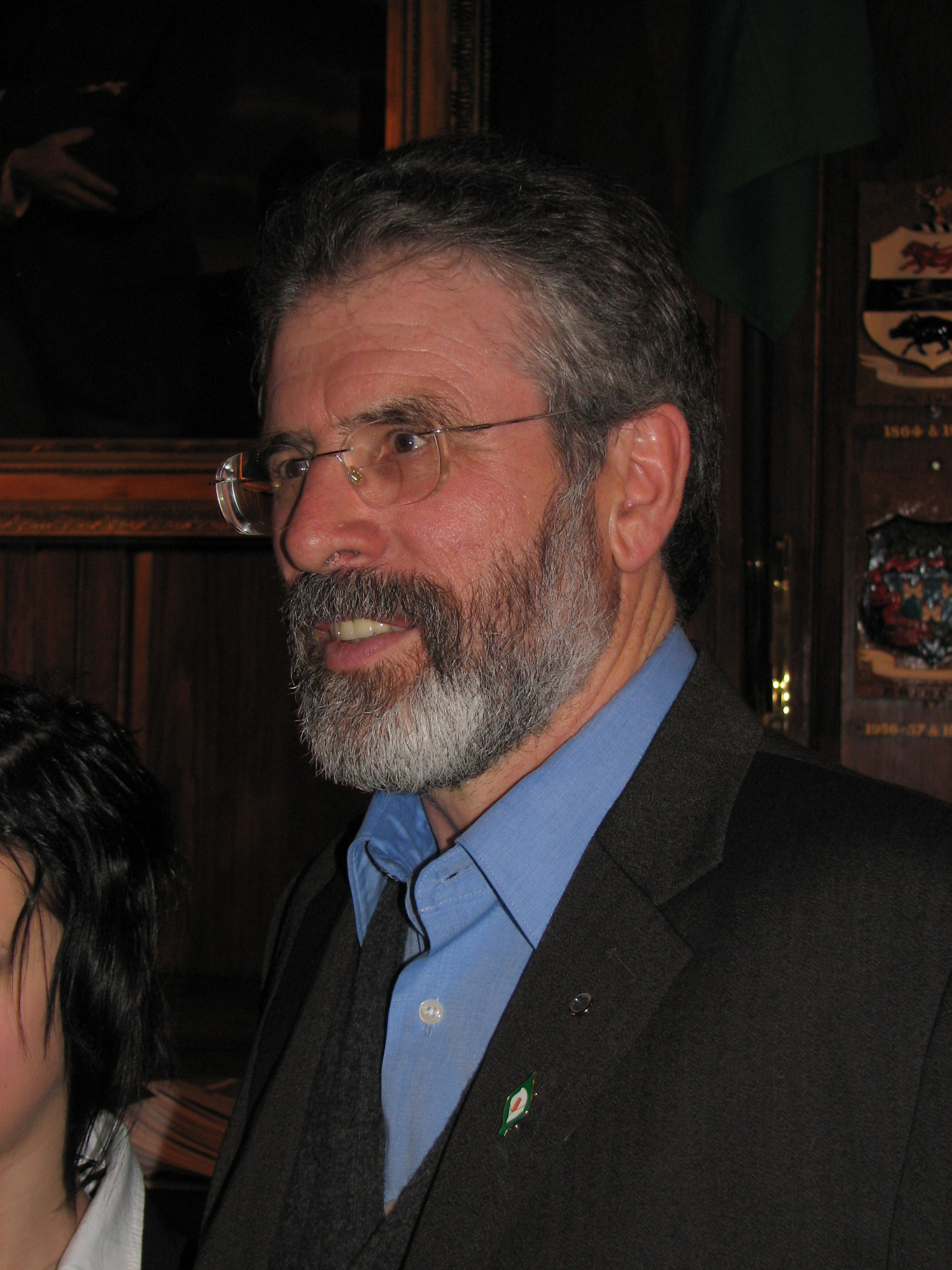
Adams wearing an Easter Lily (2008)

In the late 1960s, a civil rights campaign developed in Northern Ireland. After being radicalised by the Divis Street riots during the 1964 United Kingdom general election campaign, Adams joined Sinn Féin and Fianna Éireann. Adams was an active supporter and joined the Northern Ireland Civil Rights Association in 1967. The civil rights movement was met with violence from loyalist counter-demonstrations and the RUC, and British troops were called in at the request of the Government of Northern Ireland.

In August 1971, internment was reintroduced to Northern Ireland under the Special Powers Act 1922. Adams was captured by British soldiers in March 1972. Adams was interned on HMS Maidstone, but on the Provisional IRA's insistence was released in June to take part in secret, but abortive talks in London. The IRA negotiated a short-lived truce with the British government and an IRA delegation met with British Home Secretary William Whitelaw at Cheyne Walk in Chelsea. The delegation included Adams, Martin McGuinness, Sean Mac Stiofain (IRA Chief of Staff), Daithi O'Conaill, Seamus Twomey, Ivor Bell and Dublin solicitor Myles Shevlin.

Adams was re-arrested in July 1973 and interned at the HM Prison Maze. After taking part in an IRA-organised escape attempt, he was sentenced to a period of imprisonment. During this time, he wrote articles in the paper An Phoblacht under the by-line "Brownie", where he criticised the strategy and policy of Sinn Féin president Ruairí Ó Brádaigh and Billy McKee, the IRA's officer commanding in Belfast. He was also highly critical of a decision taken by McKee to assassinate members of the rival Official IRA, who had been on ceasefire since 1972. In 2020, the UK Supreme Court quashed Adams's convictions for attempting to escape on Christmas Eve in 1973 and again in July 1974.

In 1977, Ballymurphy priest Des Wilson (who had officiated at Adams's wedding) assisted with an early attempt by Adams to open channels to dissident unionists. He helped set up meeting with Desmond Boal QC, a unionist barrister who had been first chairman of Ian Paisley's Democratic Unionist Party. At the time, Boal was co-operating with Seán MacBride as joint mediator in confidential negotiations between the Provisional IRA and the Ulster Volunteer Force about a federal settlement for Ireland. A short time later, Wilson drove Adams to a meeting with John McKeague, founding member of the Red Hand Commando, then flirting with the idea of an independent Ulster. Inasmuch as they were "frank", Adams found the meetings "constructive", but could find no common political ground. Wilson was of the view that Adams was "one of the very few people who could actually bring a military campaign into a political campaign".

=== Provisional Irish Republican Army ===
Adams has consistently denied ever being a member of the Provisional Irish Republican Army (IRA).

However, journalists such as Ed Moloney, Peter Taylor, and Mark Urban, and historians, such as Richard English and John Bowyer Bell, have all named Adams as having been part of the IRA leadership from the 1970s. Furthermore, several former IRA members, including Brendan Hughes, Ivor Bell, and Seán Mac Stíofáin, have said Adams was also a member of the organisation. Practically all academics agree that Adams joined the IRA in the mid-1960s, was the Officer commanding (OC) of the 2nd battalion of the Belfast Brigade from 1971 to 1972, became the adjutant for the brigade in 1972, and had become the OC of the brigade by 1973.

Moloney and Taylor state that Adams became the IRA's Chief of Staff following the arrest of Seamus Twomey in early December 1977, remaining in the position until 18 February 1978 when he, along with twenty other republican suspects, was arrested following the La Mon restaurant bombing. He was charged with IRA membership and remanded to Crumlin Road Gaol. He was released seven months later when the Lord Chief Justice of Northern Ireland Robert Lowry ruled there was insufficient evidence to proceed with the prosecution. Moloney and English state Adams was a member of the IRA Army Council from 1977, and remained so until 2005, according to former Irish Minister for Justice, Equality and Law Reform Michael McDowell.

Rightly or wrongly, I am an IRA Volunteer and, rightly or wrongly, I take a course of action as a means to bringing about a situation in which I believe the people of my country will prosper.

— "Brownie" (reportedly a pseudonym of Adams's) in an article written in An Phoblacht while Adams was a prisoner in Long Kesh in 1976

== Rise in Sinn Féin ==
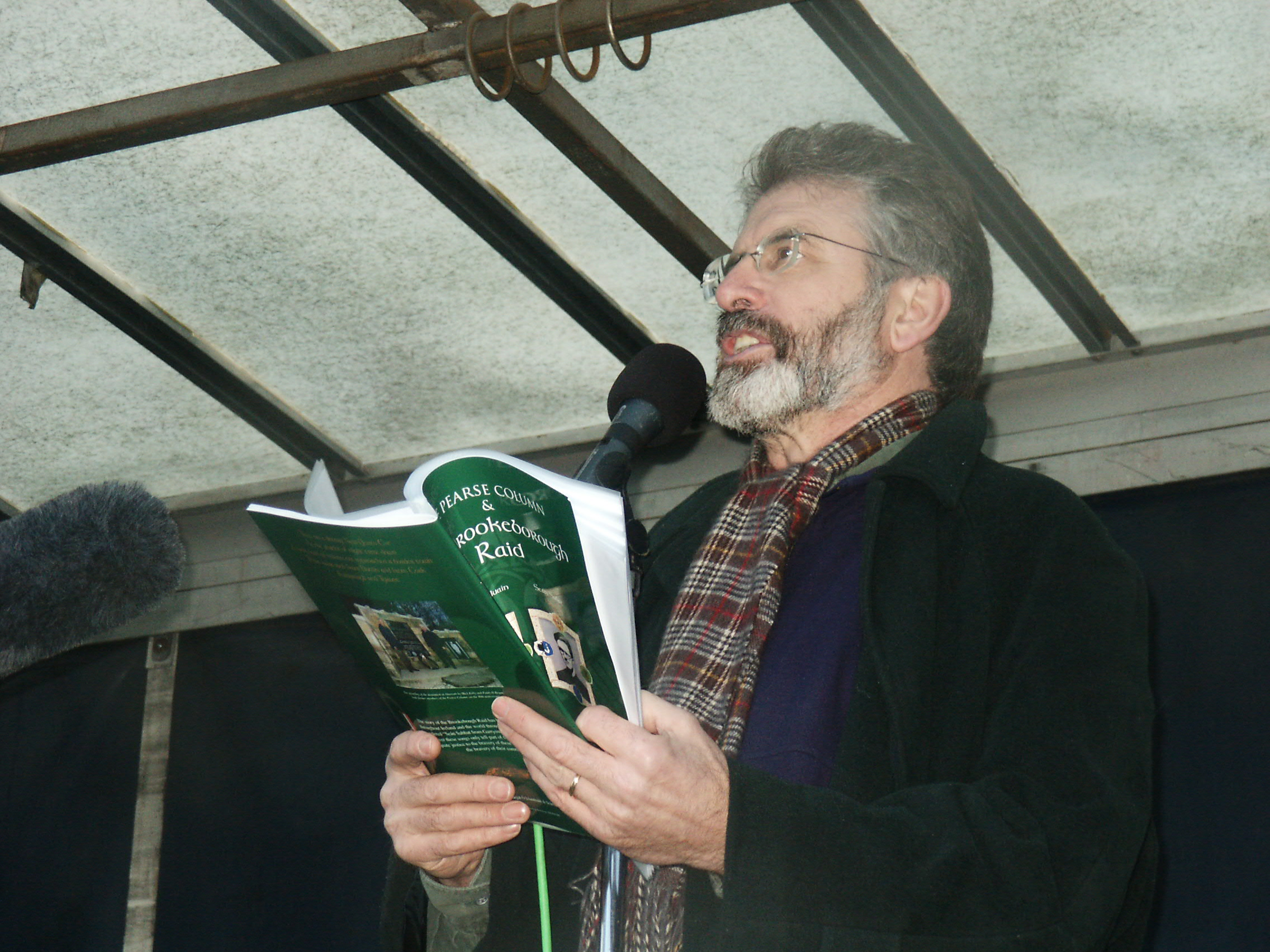
Adams at a commemoration in County Fermanagh (2001)

In 1978, Adams became joint vice-president of Sinn Féin and a key figure in directing a challenge to the Sinn Féin leadership of president Ruairí Ó Brádaigh and joint vice-president Dáithí Ó Conaill. The 1975 IRA–British truce is often viewed as the event that began the challenge to the original Provisional Sinn Féin leadership, which was dominated by southerners like Ó Brádaigh and Ó Conaill.

One of the reasons that the Provisional IRA and Provisional Sinn Féin were founded, in December 1969 and January 1970, respectively, was that people like Ó Brádaigh, Ó Conaill and McKee opposed participation in constitutional politics. The other reason was the failure of the Cathal Goulding leadership to provide for the defence of Irish nationalist areas during the 1969 Northern Ireland riots. When, at the December 1969 IRA convention and the January 1970 Sinn Féin Ard Fheis, the delegates voted to participate in the Dublin (Leinster House), Belfast (Stormont) and London (Westminster) parliaments, the organisations split. Adams, who had joined the republican movement in the early 1960s, sided with the Provisionals.

In the Maze prison in the mid-1970s, writing under the pseudonym "Brownie" in Republican News, Adams called for increased political activity among republicans, especially at local level. The call resonated with younger Northern people, some of whom had been active in the Provisional IRA but few of whom had been active in Sinn Féin. In 1977, Adams and Danny Morrison drafted the address of Jimmy Drumm at the annual Wolfe Tone commemoration at Bodenstown. The address was viewed as watershed in that Drumm acknowledged that the war would be a long one and that success depended on political activity that would complement the IRA's armed campaign. For some, this wedding of politics and armed struggle culminated in Danny Morrison's statement at the 1981 Sinn Féin ardfheis in which he asked "Who here really believes we can win the war through the ballot box? But will anyone here object if, with a ballot paper in one hand and the Armalite in the other, we take power in Ireland?" For others, however, the call to link political activity with armed struggle had already been defined in Sinn Féin policy and in the presidential addresses of Ruairí Ó Brádaigh, but this had not resonated with young Northerners.

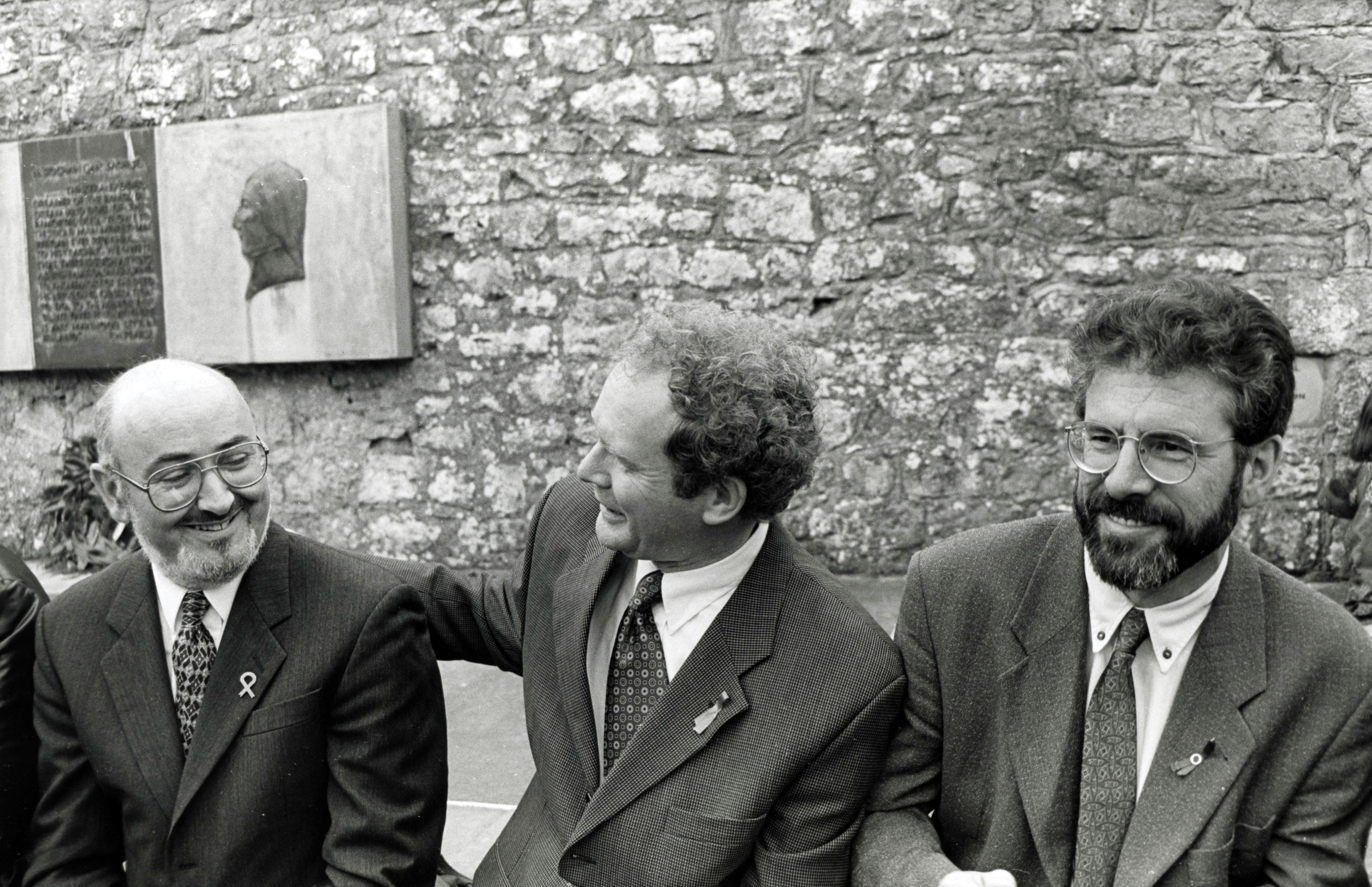
Adams with Martin McGuinness and Caoimhghín Ó Caoláin in 1997

Even after the election of Bobby Sands as MP for Fermanagh and South Tyrone, a part of the mass mobilisation associated with the 1981 Irish hunger strike by republican prisoners in the H blocks of the Maze Prison, Adams was cautious that the level of political involvement by Sinn Féin could lead to electoral embarrassment. Charles Haughey, the Taoiseach of Ireland, called an election for June 1981. At an ard chomhairle meeting, Adams recommended that they contest only four constituencies which were in border counties. Instead, H-Block/Armagh candidates contested nine constituencies and elected two TDs. This, along with the election of Sands, was a precursor to an electoral breakthrough in elections in 1982 to the 1982 Northern Ireland Assembly. Adams, Danny Morrison, Martin McGuinness, Jim McAllister and Owen Carron were elected as abstentionists. The Social Democratic and Labour Party (SDLP) had announced before the election that it would not take any seats and so its 14 elected representatives also abstained from participating in the Assembly and it was a failure. The 1982 election was followed by the 1983 Westminster election, in which Sinn Féin's vote increased and Adams was elected, as an abstentionist, as MP for Belfast West. It was in 1983 that Ruairí Ó Brádaigh resigned as President of Sinn Féin and was succeeded by Adams.

In 1983, Adams was elected president of Sinn Féin and became the first Sinn Féin MP elected to the British House of Commons since Phil Clarke and Tom Mitchell in the mid-1950s. Following his election as MP for Belfast West, the British government lifted a ban on his travelling to Great Britain. In line with Sinn Féin policy, he refused to take his seat in the House of Commons.

=== Assassination attempt by the UDA ===
On 14 March 1984 in central Belfast, Adams was seriously wounded in an assassination attempt when Ulster Defence Association (UDA) gunmen fired about 20 shots into the car in which he was travelling. He was hit in the neck, shoulder and arm. He was rushed to the Royal Victoria Hospital, where he underwent surgery to remove three bullets. John Gregg and his team were apprehended almost immediately by a British Army patrol that opened fire on them before ramming their car. The attack had been known in advance by security forces due to a tip-off from informants within the UDA; Adams and his co-passengers had survived in part because RUC officers, acting on the informants' information, had replaced much of the ammunition in the UDA's Rathcoole weapons dump with low-velocity bullets. Some, including Adams himself, still have unanswered questions about the RUC's actions prior to the shooting. An Ulster Defence Regiment NCO subsequently received the Queen's Gallantry Medal for chasing and arresting an assailant.

== President of Sinn Féin ==
Many republicans had long claimed that the only legitimate Irish state was the Irish Republic declared in the 1916 Proclamation of the Republic. In their view, the legitimate government was the IRA Army Council, which had been vested with the authority of that Republic in 1938 (prior to the Second World War) by the last remaining anti-Treaty deputies of the Second Dáil. In his 2005 speech to the Sinn Féin ardfheis in Dublin, Adams explicitly rejected this view. "But we refuse to criminalise those who break the law in pursuit of legitimate political objectives. ... Sinn Féin is accused of recognising the Army Council of the IRA as the legitimate government of this island. That is not the case. [We] do not believe that the Army Council is the government of Ireland. Such a government will only exist when all the people of this island elect it. Does Sinn Féin accept the institutions of this state as the legitimate institutions of this state? Of course we do."

As a result of this non-recognition, Sinn Féin had abstained from taking any of the seats they won in the British or Irish parliaments. At its 1986 ardfheis, Sinn Féin delegates passed a resolution to amend the rules and constitution that would allow its members to sit in the Dublin parliament. At this, Ruairí Ó Brádaigh led a small walkout, just as he and Sean Mac Stiofain had done sixteen years earlier with the creation of Provisional Sinn Féin. This minority, which rejected dropping the policy of abstentionism, now distinguishes itself from Sinn Féin by using the name Republican Sinn Féin, and maintains that they are the true Sinn Féin.

Adams's leadership of Sinn Féin was supported by a Northern-based cadre that included people like Danny Morrison and Martin McGuinness. Over time, Adams and others pointed to republican electoral successes in the early and mid-1980s, when hunger strikers Bobby Sands and Kieran Doherty were elected to the British House of Commons and Dáil Éireann respectively, and they advocated that Sinn Féin become increasingly political and base its influence on electoral politics rather than paramilitarism. The electoral effects of this strategy were shown later by the election of Adams and McGuinness to the House of Commons.

=== Voice ban ===
Adams's prominence as an Irish republican leader was increased by the 1988–1994 British broadcasting voice restrictions, which were imposed by British Prime Minister Margaret Thatcher to "starve the terrorist and the hijacker of the oxygen of publicity on which they depend". Thatcher was moved to act after BBC interviews of Martin McGuinness and Adams had been the focus of a row over an edition of After Dark, a proposed Channel 4 discussion programme which was never made. While the ban covered 11 Irish political parties and paramilitary organisations, in practice it mostly affected Sinn Féin, the most prominent of these bodies.

A similar ban, known as Section 31, had been law in the Republic of Ireland since the 1970s. However, media outlets soon found ways around the bans. In the UK, this was initially by the use of subtitles, but later and more often by an actor reading words accompanied by video footage of the banned person speaking. Actors who voiced Adams included Stephen Rea and Paul Loughran. This loophole could not be used in the Republic, as word-for-word broadcasts were not allowed. Instead, the banned speaker's words were summarised by the newsreader, over video of them speaking.

These bans were lampooned in cartoons, by comedians and satirical TV shows, such as Jasper Carrott, Spitting Image, and in The Day Today, and were criticised by freedom of speech organisations and media personalities, including BBC Director General John Birt and BBC foreign editor John Simpson. The Republic's ban was allowed to lapse in January 1994, and the British ban was lifted by Prime Minister John Major in September 1994.

== Movement into mainstream politics ==
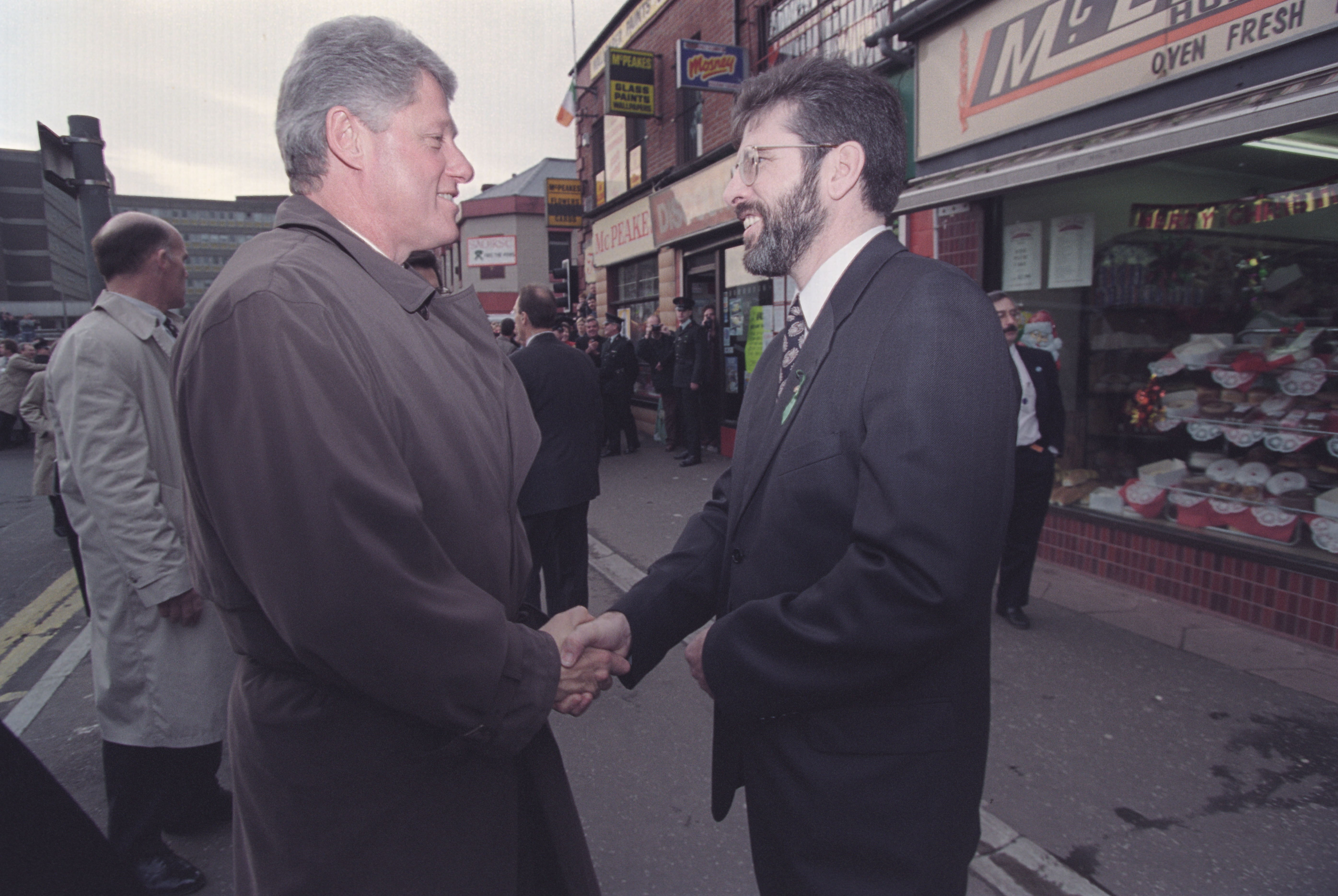
Adams with US President Bill Clinton in 1995

Sinn Féin continued its policy of refusing to sit in the Westminster parliament after Adams won the Belfast West constituency. He lost his seat to Joe Hendron of the SDLP in the 1992 general election, regaining it at the following 1997 election. Under Adams, Sinn Féin moved away from being a political voice of the Provisional IRA to becoming a professionally organised political party in both Northern Ireland and the Republic of Ireland.

SDLP leader John Hume identified the possibility that a negotiated settlement might be possible and began secret talks with Adams in 1988. These discussions led to unofficial contacts with the British Northern Ireland Office under the Secretary of State for Northern Ireland, Peter Brooke, and with the government of the Republic under Charles Haughey – although both governments maintained in public that they would not negotiate with terrorists. These talks provided the groundwork for what was later to be the Belfast Agreement, preceded by the milestone Downing Street Declaration and the Joint Framework Document.

These negotiations led to the IRA ceasefire in August 1994. Taoiseach Albert Reynolds, who had replaced Haughey and who had played a key role in the Hume/Adams dialogue through his Special Adviser Martin Mansergh, regarded the ceasefire as permanent. However, the slow pace of developments contributed in part to the (wider) political difficulties of the British government of John Major. His consequent reliance on Ulster Unionist Party (UUP) votes in the House of Commons led to him agreeing with the UUP demand to exclude Sinn Féin from talks until the IRA had decommissioned its weapons. Sinn Féin's exclusion led the IRA to end its ceasefire and resume its campaign.

After the 1997 United Kingdom general election, the new Labour government had a majority in the House of Commons and was not reliant on unionist votes. The subsequent dropping of the insistence led to another IRA ceasefire, as part of the negotiations strategy, which saw teams from the British and Irish governments, the UUP, the SDLP, Sinn Féin, and representatives of loyalist paramilitary organisations, under the chairmanship of former United States Senator George Mitchell, produce the Good Friday Agreement in 1998. Under the Agreement, structures were created reflecting the Irish and British identities of the people of Ireland, creating a British-Irish Council and a Northern Ireland Legislative Assembly.

Articles 2 and 3 of the Constitution of Ireland of the Republic's constitution, which claimed sovereignty over all of Ireland, were reworded, and a power-sharing Executive Committee was provided for. As part of their deal, Sinn Féin agreed to abandon its abstentionist policy regarding a "six-county parliament", as a result taking seats in the new Stormont-based Assembly and running the education and health and social services ministries in the power-sharing government.

=== Sinn Féin in government ===
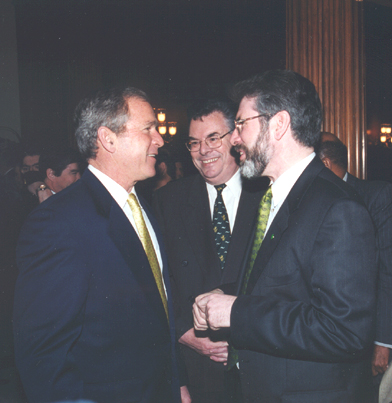
Adams with US President George W. Bush and Peter King in 2001

On 15 August 1998, four months after the signing of the Good Friday Agreement, the Omagh bombing by the Real IRA, killed 29 people and injured 220, from multiple communities. Adams said in reaction to the bombing: "I am totally horrified by this action. I condemn it without any equivocation whatsoever." Prior to this, Adams had not used the word "condemn" in relation to IRA or their splinter groups' actions.

In March 2007, Adams was re-elected to the Northern Ireland Assembly, and subsequently met with DUP leader Ian Paisley face-to-face for the first time. These talks led to the St Andrews Agreement, which brought about the return of the power-sharing Executive in Northern Ireland. When Sinn Féin came to nominate its two ministers to the Northern Ireland Executive, for tactical reasons the party, like the SDLP and the DUP, chose not to include its leader among its ministers.

In January 2009, Adams attended the United States presidential inauguration of Barack Obama as a guest of US representative Richard Neal.

=== Election to Dáil Éireann ===
Adams was re-elected as MP for West Belfast with 71.1% of the vote in May 2010, but resigned his seat the following December, in order to seek election as a TD (member of the Irish Parliament) for the constituency of Louth at the 2011 Irish general election. He topped the poll in the constituency with 15,072 (21.7%) first preference votes, and was duly elected to Dáil Éireann where he succeeded Caoimhghín Ó Caoláin as Sinn Féin parliamentary leader.

In December 2013, Adams was a member of the Guard of Honour at Nelson Mandela's funeral.

=== 2014 arrest ===
On 30 April 2014, Adams was arrested by detectives from the Police Service of Northern Ireland (PSNI) Serious Crime Branch, under the Terrorism Act 2000, in connection with the murder of Jean McConville in 1972. He had previously voluntarily arranged to be interviewed by police regarding the matter, and maintained he had no involvement. Fellow Sinn Féin politician Alex Maskey stated that the timing of the arrest, "three weeks into an election", was evidence of a "political agenda [...] a negative agenda" by the PSNI. McConville's family had campaigned for the arrest of Adams for the murder. McConville's son Michael said that his family did not think the arrest of Adams would ever happen, and were glad that the arrest took place. Adams was released without charge after four days in custody when a file was sent to the Public Prosecution Service, which would decide if criminal charges should be brought.

At a press conference after his release, Adams criticised the timing of his arrest, reiterated Sinn Féin's support for the PSNI and said: "The IRA is gone. It is finished." Adams denied that he had any involvement in the murder or was ever a member of the IRA, and said the allegations came from "enemies of the peace process". On 29 September 2015 the Public Prosecution Service announced Adams would not face charges, due to insufficient evidence,

=== Late presidency ===
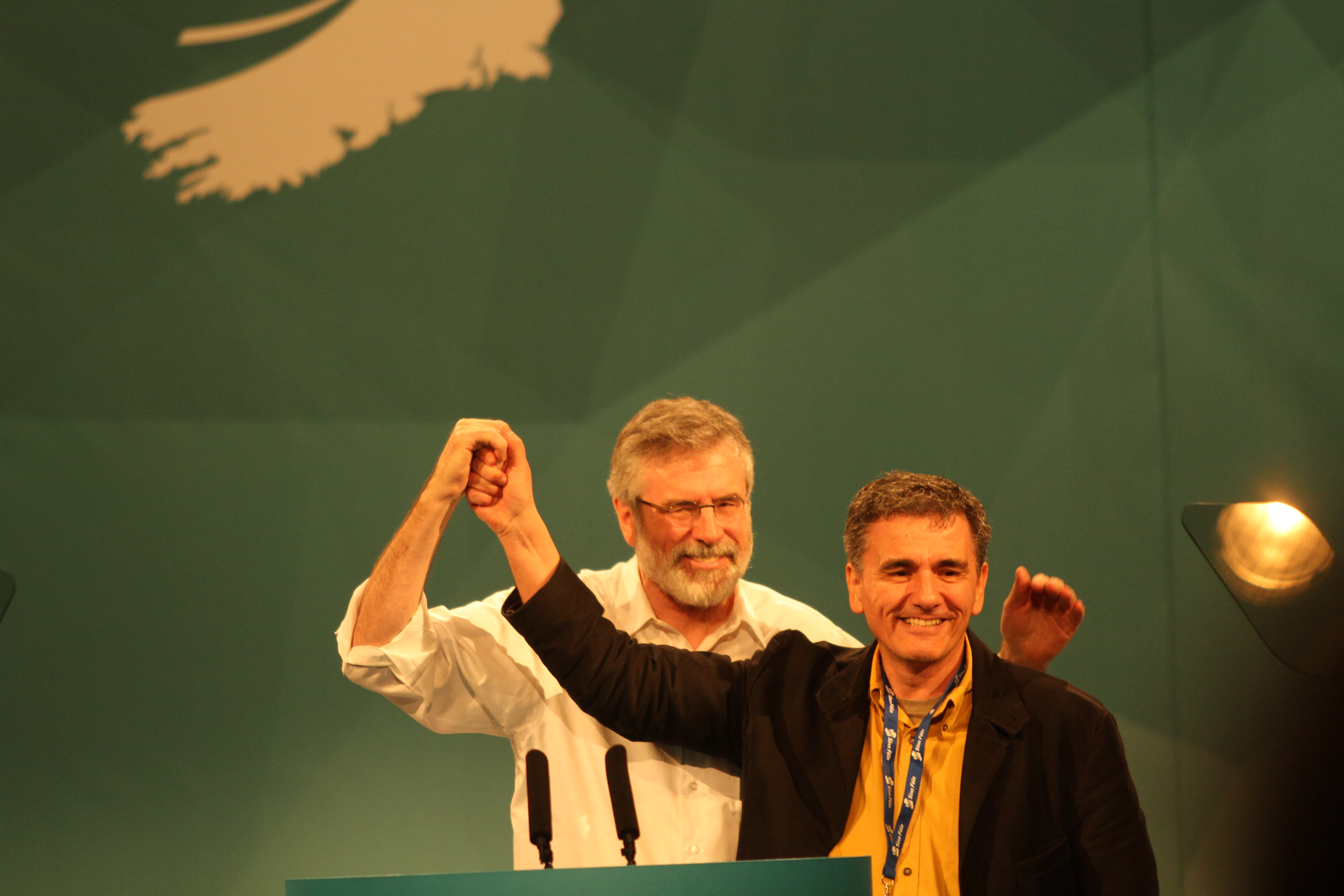
Gerry Adams with Euclid Tsakalotos at the Sinn Féin ardfheis in March 2015

On 19 May 2015, while on an official royal trip to Ireland, Prince Charles shook Adams's hand in what was described as a highly symbolic gesture of reconciliation. The meeting, described as "historic", took place in Galway.

In September 2017, Adams said he would allow his name to go forward for a one-year term as president of Sinn Féin at the November ardfheis, at which point Sinn Féin would begin a "planned process of generational change, including [Adams's] own future intentions". This resulted in speculation in the Irish and British media that Adams was preparing to stand down as party leader, and that he might run for President of Ireland in the next election. At the ardfheis on 18 November, Adams was re-elected for another year as party president, but announced that he would step down at some point in 2018, and would not seek re-election as TD for Louth.

=== End of Sinn Féin presidency ===
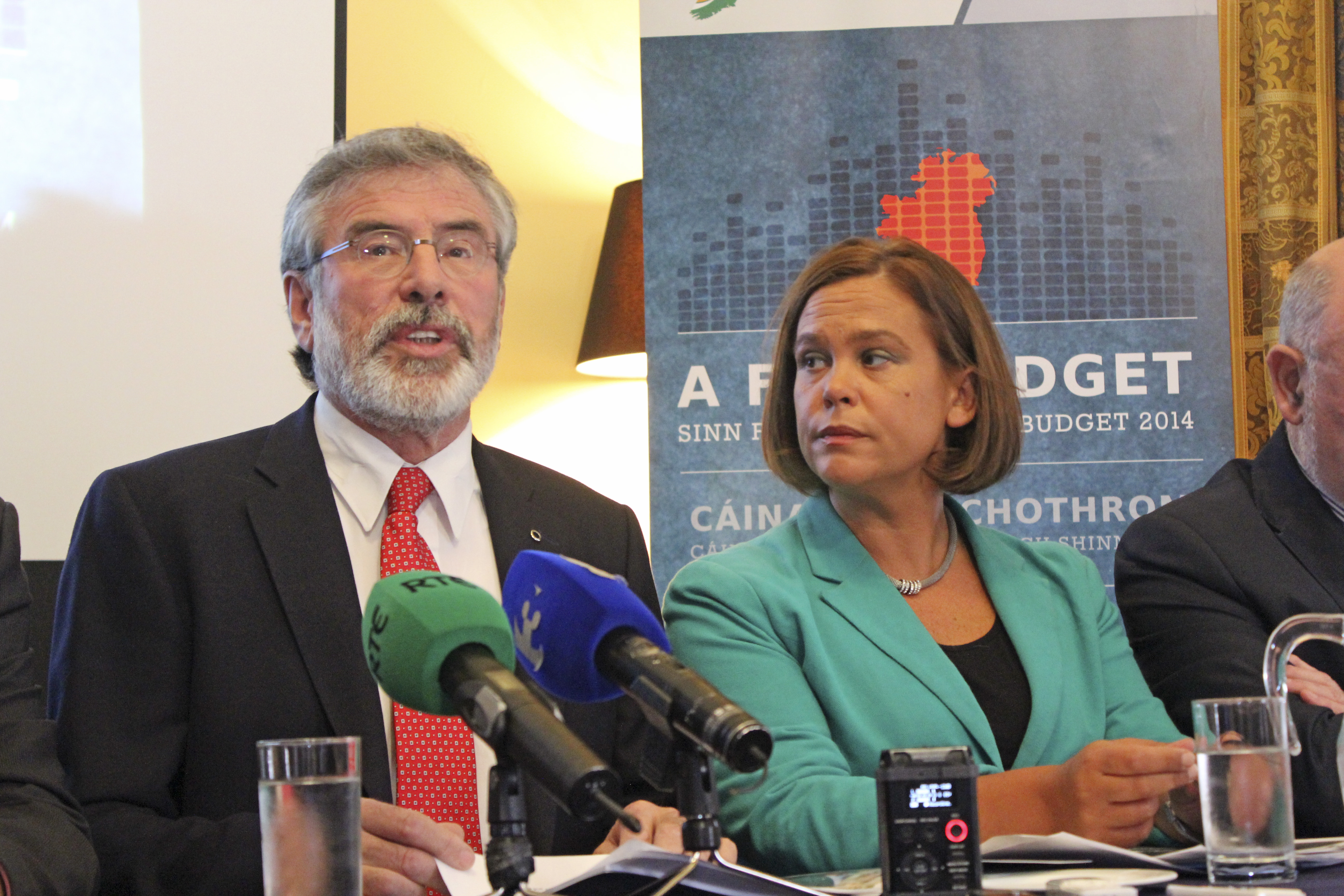
Adams and his successor Mary Lou McDonald, pictured here in 2014

Adams's presidency of Sinn Féin ended on 10 February 2018, with his stepping down and the election of Mary Lou McDonald as the party's new president.

On 13 July 2018, a home-made bomb was thrown at Adams's home in West Belfast, damaging a car parked in his driveway. Adams escaped injury and claimed that his two grandchildren were standing in the driveway only ten minutes before the blast. Another bomb was set off that same evening at the nearby home of former IRA volunteer and Sinn Féin official Bobby Storey. In a press conference the following day, Adams said he thought the attacks were linked to the riots in Derry, and asked that those responsible "come and sit down" and "give us the rationale for this action".

=== Legal cases ===
In 2017, Adams launched a defamation case against the BBC over a programme it ran that alleged he sanctioned the murder of an informer. The case stems from a 2016 BBC Northern Ireland Spotlight TV documentary. The programme focused on Denis Donaldson, a member of Sinn Féin, who was also in the IRA. He was murdered in 2006, four months after Adams revealed that he was an informer for the MI5. At the time, the murder was condemned by all, including Adams. Adams also denied any involvement in his murder. In May 2025, Adams won the case, with the jury ruling the programme defamatory and awarding him €100,000 (approximately £85,000) in damages. Following the trial, Adams said: "I've always been satisfied with my reputation ... we all have flaws in our character, but the jury made the decision and let's accept the outcome."

In March 2026, Adams testified at the civil high court in London in a case brought by three victims of IRA bombings. They aimed to prove that Adams was an IRA army council member (which he denies) and thus responsible for their injuries, seeking only token damages of £1 each after crowdfunding their legal fees. They dropped the suit following nine days of testimony by witnesses, their lawyer alleging unfairness because the judge, Mr Justice Swift, was considering whether the case was an abuse of process. If that were confirmed, the claimants would have lost protection against paying Adams' costs.

== Personal life ==
In 1971, Adams married Collette McArdle. Their son Gearoid who was born in 1973, went on to play Gaelic football for Antrim GAA senior men's team and became its assistant manager in 2012.

In 2013, Adams's brother Liam was found guilty of 10 offences, including rape and gross indecency committed against his own daughter. After the allegations of abuse were first made public in 2009, Gerry Adams alleged that his father had subjected family members to emotional, physical, and sexual abuse. Liam was jailed for 16 years, and died of pancreatic cancer in February 2019 at the age of 63 while in Maghaberry Prison.

In 2016, Adams sparked controversy by posting on social media that he was watching Django Unchained and considered the title character to be a "Ballymurphy nigger". This was widely reported, and Adams deleted it and apologised, stating that he was comparing the situation of African Americans to Irish nationalists in Northern Ireland.

== Media portrayals ==
Adams has been portrayed in a number of films, TV series, and books:

- 1999 – The Marching Season, a spy fiction novel by Daniel Silva.
- 2004 – film Omagh, with actor Jonathan Ryan, a dramatisation of the 1998 Omagh bombing and its aftermath.
- 2010 – TV film Mo, with actor John Lynch, the story of Mo Mowlam and the Good Friday Agreement.
- 2012 – The Cold Cold Ground, a crime novel by Adrian McKinty; Adams is interviewed by the book's main character after an associate is found murdered.
- 2016 – film The Journey, with actor Ian Beattie.
- 2017 – film The Foreigner, with actor Pierce Brosnan playing a former IRA leader who resembles Adams.
- 2024 – TV series Say Nothing, with actors Josh Finan and Michael Colgan. The series portrays Adams as being a senior IRA commander. Each episode contains an endnote stating "Gerry Adams has always denied being a member of the IRA or participating in any IRA-related violence."
- 2024 – in the film Kneecap, Adams made a brief appearance playing himself as part of a ketamine-induced hallucination.

== Published works ==
- Falls Memories, 1982
- The Politics of Irish Freedom, 1986
- A Pathway to Peace, 1988
- An Irish Voice: The Quest for Peace
- Cage Eleven, 1990, Brandon Books, ISBN 978-0-86322-114-9
- The Street and Other Stories, 1993, Brandon Books, ISBN 978-0-86322-293-1
- Free Ireland: Towards a Lasting Peace, 1995
- Before the Dawn: An Autobiography, 1996, Brandon Books, ISBN 978-0-434-00341-9
- Selected Writings
- Who Fears to Speak...?, 2001 (Original Edition 1991), Beyond the Pale Publications, ISBN 978-1-900960-13-7
- An Irish Journal, 2001, Brandon Books, ISBN 978-0-86322-282-5
- Hope and History: Making Peace in Ireland, 2003, Brandon Books, ISBN 978-0-86322-330-3
- A Farther Shore, 2005, Random House
- The New Ireland: A Vision For The Future, 2005, Brandon Books, ISBN 978-0-86322-344-0
- An Irish Eye, 2007, Brandon Books, ISBN 978-0-86322-370-9
- My Little Book of Tweets, 2016, Mercier Press, ISBN 978-1-78117-449-4

== Works cited ==
- McDonald, Henry; Cusack, Jim (2004). UDA: Inside the Heart of Loyalist Terror. Penguin Ireland. ISBN 978-1-84488-020-1.
- Moloney, Ed (2002). A Secret History of the IRA. Penguin Books. p. 38. ISBN 978-0-14-101041-0.
- Sharrock, David; Devenport, Mark (1997). Man of War, Man of Peace The Unauthorised Biography of Gerry Adams. London: Macmillan. p. 155. ISBN 978-0-330-35396-0.
- Taylor, Peter (1997). Provos The IRA & Sinn Féin. Bloomsbury Publishing. p. 140. ISBN 978-0-7475-3818-9.

Party political offices
Preceded by Joe Cahill; Dáithí Ó Conaill	Vice President of Sinn Féin; 1978–1983; Served alongside: Joe Cahill, Dáithí Ó Conaill	Succeeded by Phil Flynn
Preceded by Ruairí Ó Brádaigh	President of Sinn Féin; 1983–2018	Succeeded by Mary Lou McDonald
Preceded by Caoimhghín Ó Caoláin	President of Sinn Féin in the Dáil Éireann; 2011–2018	Succeeded by Mary Lou McDonald
Northern Ireland Assembly (1982)
New assembly	Member of the Northern Ireland Assembly for West Belfast; 1982–1986	Assembly abolished
Parliament of the United Kingdom
Preceded by Gerry Fitt	Member of Parliament for Belfast West; 1983–1992	Succeeded by Joe Hendron
Preceded by Joe Hendron	Member of Parliament for Belfast West; 1997–2011	Succeeded by Paul Maskey
Northern Ireland Forum
New forum	Member of the Northern Ireland Forum for West Belfast; 1996–1998	Forum dissolved
Northern Ireland Assembly
New assembly	Member of the Legislative Assembly for Belfast West; 1998–2010	Succeeded by Pat Sheehan

Dáil	Election	Deputy (Party)	Deputy (Party)	Deputy (Party)	Deputy (Party)	Deputy (Party)
4th	1923	Frank Aiken (Rep)	Peter Hughes (CnaG)	James Murphy (CnaG)	3 seats until 1977	
5th	1927 (Jun)	Frank Aiken (FF)	James Coburn (NL)	James Murphy (CnaG)	3 seats until 1977	
6th	1927 (Sep)	Frank Aiken (FF)	James Coburn (NL)	James Murphy (CnaG)	3 seats until 1977	
7th	1932	Frank Aiken (FF)	James Coburn (Ind.)	James Murphy (CnaG)	3 seats until 1977	
8th	1933	Frank Aiken (FF)	James Coburn (Ind.)	James Murphy (CnaG)	3 seats until 1977	
9th	1937	Frank Aiken (FF)	James Coburn (FG)	Laurence Walsh (FF)	3 seats until 1977	
10th	1938	Frank Aiken (FF)	James Coburn (FG)	Laurence Walsh (FF)	3 seats until 1977	
11th	1943	Frank Aiken (FF)	James Coburn (FG)	Roddy Connolly (Lab)	3 seats until 1977	
12th	1944	Frank Aiken (FF)	James Coburn (FG)	Laurence Walsh (FF)	3 seats until 1977	
13th	1948	Frank Aiken (FF)	James Coburn (FG)	Roddy Connolly (Lab)	3 seats until 1977	
14th	1951	Frank Aiken (FF)	James Coburn (FG)	Laurence Walsh (FF)	3 seats until 1977	
14th	1954 by-election	Frank Aiken (FF)	George Coburn (FG)	Laurence Walsh (FF)	3 seats until 1977	
15th	1954	Frank Aiken (FF)	George Coburn (FG)	Paddy Donegan (FG)	3 seats until 1977	
16th	1957	Frank Aiken (FF)	George Coburn (FG)	Pádraig Faulkner (Note: Faulker served as Ceann Comhairle in the 21st Dáil from 1977 to 1981, and was returned automatically at the 1981 election.) (FF)	3 seats until 1977	
17th	1961	Frank Aiken (FF)	Paddy Donegan (FG)	Pádraig Faulkner (FF)	3 seats until 1977	
18th	1965	Frank Aiken (FF)	Paddy Donegan (FG)	Pádraig Faulkner (FF)	3 seats until 1977	
19th	1969	Frank Aiken (FF)	Paddy Donegan (FG)	Pádraig Faulkner (FF)	3 seats until 1977	
20th	1973	Joseph Farrell (FF)	Paddy Donegan (FG)	Pádraig Faulkner (FF)	3 seats until 1977	
21st	1977	Joseph Farrell (FF)	Paddy Donegan (FG)	Pádraig Faulkner (FF)	Eddie Filgate (FF)	4 seats 1977–2011
22nd	1981	Paddy Agnew (AHB)	Bernard Markey (FG)	Pádraig Faulkner (FF)	Eddie Filgate (FF)	4 seats 1977–2011
23rd	1982 (Feb)	Thomas Bellew (FF)	Bernard Markey (FG)	Pádraig Faulkner (FF)	Eddie Filgate (FF)	4 seats 1977–2011
24th	1982 (Nov)	Michael Bell (Lab)	Brendan McGahon (FG)	Pádraig Faulkner (FF)	Séamus Kirk (Note: Kirk served as Ceann Comhairle in the 30th Dáil from 2009 to 2011, and was returned automatically at the 2011 election.) (FF)	4 seats 1977–2011
25th	1987	Michael Bell (Lab)	Brendan McGahon (FG)	Dermot Ahern (FF)	Séamus Kirk (FF)	4 seats 1977–2011
26th	1989	Michael Bell (Lab)	Brendan McGahon (FG)	Dermot Ahern (FF)	Séamus Kirk (FF)	4 seats 1977–2011
27th	1992	Michael Bell (Lab)	Brendan McGahon (FG)	Dermot Ahern (FF)	Séamus Kirk (FF)	4 seats 1977–2011
28th	1997	Michael Bell (Lab)	Brendan McGahon (FG)	Dermot Ahern (FF)	Séamus Kirk (FF)	4 seats 1977–2011
29th	2002	Arthur Morgan (SF)	Fergus O'Dowd (FG)	Dermot Ahern (FF)	Séamus Kirk (FF)	4 seats 1977–2011
30th	2007	Arthur Morgan (SF)	Fergus O'Dowd (FG)	Dermot Ahern (FF)	Séamus Kirk (FF)	4 seats 1977–2011
31st	2011	Gerry Adams (SF)	Fergus O'Dowd (FG)	Ged Nash (Lab)	Séamus Kirk (FF)	Peter Fitzpatrick (FG)
32nd	2016	Gerry Adams (SF)	Fergus O'Dowd (FG)	Declan Breathnach (FF)	Imelda Munster (SF)	Peter Fitzpatrick (FG)
33rd	2020	Ruairí Ó Murchú (SF)	Fergus O'Dowd (FG)	Ged Nash (Lab)	Imelda Munster (SF)	Peter Fitzpatrick (Ind.)
34th	2024	Ruairí Ó Murchú (SF)	Paula Butterly (FG)	Ged Nash (Lab)	Joanna Byrne (SF)	Erin McGreehan (FF)
