= Ulsterisation =

British military policy in Northern Ireland during the Troubles

Ulsterisation refers to one part – "primacy of the police" – of a three-part strategy (the other two being "normalisation" and "criminalisation") of the British government during the conflict known as the Troubles. The strategy was to disengage the non-Ulster regiments of the British Army as much as possible from duties in Northern Ireland and replace them with members of the locally-recruited Royal Ulster Constabulary (RUC) and Ulster Defence Regiment (UDR). The objective of this policy was to confine the effects of the conflict to Northern Ireland.

== Name and origin ==
The name of the policy comes from a similar US strategy towards the end of the Vietnam War called "Vietnamization". Vietnamization was a policy to increase the proportion of South Vietnamese forces fighting in the conflict, while reducing that of the American military. It was a response to "Vietnam syndrome" in which American public opinion turned against American military involvement in Vietnam. By analogy, British policymakers perceived the death of soldiers from Great Britain (i.e. England, Scotland, and Wales) during the Troubles to be far more consequential in terms of British public opinion than what could be portrayed as "Irish people killing and policing Irish people".

The move to locally based policing followed the Hunt Report, published on 3 October 1969. This recommended a complete reorganisation of the Royal Ulster Constabulary, with the aim of both modernising the force and bringing it into line with the other police forces in the UK. In 1970, Lord Carrington also warned that British Army expenditures in Northern Ireland were unacceptably high; throughout the 1970s, military leadership stressed the need to focus on confronting the Red Army on the North German Plain, rather than on fighting in Northern Ireland. The Ulsterisation plan was outlined in an unpublished 1975 British strategy paper titled The Way Ahead produced by a committee of senior British Army, RUC and MI5 officers, chaired by John Bourn, a Northern Ireland Office civil servant.

== Implementation ==
Ulsterisation included various attempts to reform views of the RUC, whose reputation had suffered from its involvement in the 1969 Northern Ireland riots, which was seen as biased by Northern Ireland civil rights movement campaigners. Under Labour's first Secretary of State for Northern Ireland Merlyn Rees, increases in the proportion of police and army recruits from Northern Ireland into the UDR continued until the signing of the Anglo-Irish Agreement in 1985. Rees' aim was to put security policy on a more logical and rational basis, and along with the Chief Constable of the RUC, Englishman Kenneth Newman, they produced the often controversial strategies of "criminalisation" and Ulsterisation. These policies would later be extended by Roy Mason, and would include the use of the Special Air Service on the Irish border.

== Result ==
Ulsterisation brought about striking changes in the casualty patterns, with military/police casualties from Northern Ireland exceeding those from Britain for the rest of the conflict, reversing the previous pattern. A related strategy, 'Criminalisation', was meant to alter perceptions of the conflict from a colonial war to that of a campaign against criminal gangs. It was judged that the political impact in Britain of killings of British soldiers by the Provisional Irish Republican Army was greater than the deaths of local security forces members. The drop in the number of non-UDR British Army casualties by 1976 helped prevent any build-up of sentiment in Britain for a withdrawal from Northern Ireland.
