= The Troubles in Ulster (1920–1922) =

Conflict in Northern Ireland

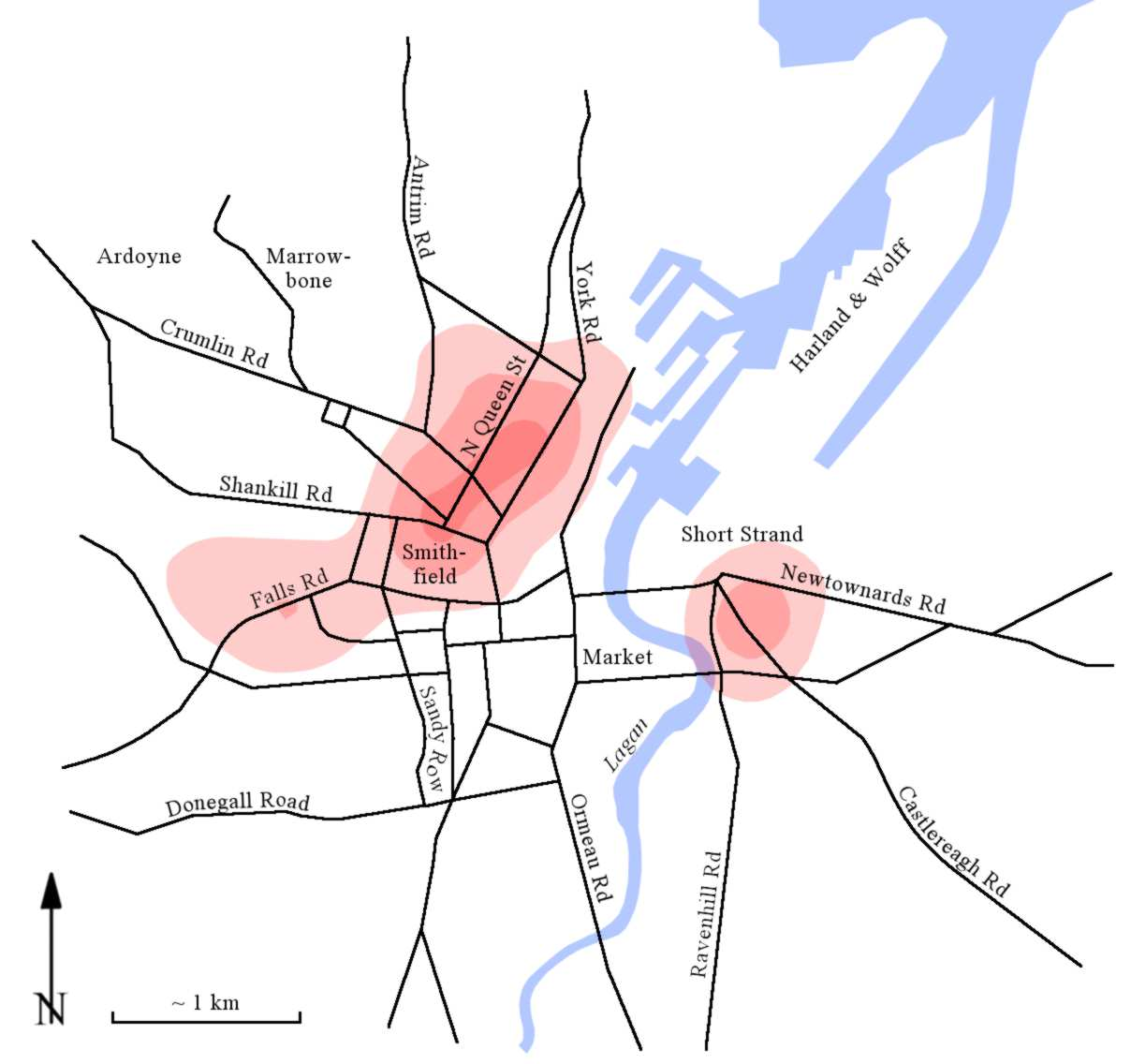
Conflict deaths in Belfast 1920–1922. 50–100 deaths per km^{2} 100–150 deaths per km^{2} over 150 deaths per km^{2}

The Troubles in Ulster of the 1920s was a period of conflict in the Irish province of Ulster, from June 1920 until June 1922, during and after the Irish War of Independence and the partition of Ireland (and specifically of Ulster). In Ulster, it was mainly a communal conflict between unionists, who wanted to remain part of the United Kingdom, and nationalists, who backed Irish independence: the unionists were mainly Ulster Protestants and the nationalists were mainly Irish Catholics. During this period, more than 500 people were killed in Belfast alone, 500 interned and 23,000 people were made homeless in the city, while approximately 50,000 people fled the province due to intimidation. Most of the victims were Nationalists (73%) with civilians being far more likely to be killed compared to the military, police or paramilitaries. In Belfast where Catholics made up only a third of the population, the disproportionate number of Catholic casualties combined with sustained attacks upon Catholic civilians involving police or special constabulary forces, led to the troubles being known as the 'Belfast Pogrom(s)'.

During the Irish War of Independence, the Irish Republican Army (IRA) attacked British security forces throughout the island; loyalists often attacked the Catholic community in retaliation. In July 1920, they drove 8,000 mostly Catholic workers out of the Belfast shipyards sparking sectarian violence in the city. That summer, violence also erupted in Derry, leaving twenty people dead, and there were mass burnings of Catholic property and expulsions of Catholics from their homes in Dromore, Lisburn and Banbridge.

Conflict continued intermittently for two years, mostly in Belfast, which saw "savage and unprecedented" communal violence between Protestants and Catholics. Almost 1,000 homes and businesses were destroyed and thousands of people were forced out of mixed neighborhoods. The British Army was deployed and the Ulster Special Constabulary (USC) (or Specials) were formed to help the regular police – the Royal Irish Constabulary (RIC). The USC was almost wholly Protestant. Members of both police forces were involved in carrying out reprisal attacks on Catholics. The self-declared Irish Republic approved the 'Belfast Boycott' of unionist-owned businesses and banks in the city. It was enforced by the IRA, who halted trains and lorries and destroyed goods.

In May 1921, the Government of Ireland Act 1920 came into force, dividing the island between two administrations: Southern Ireland (consisting of the 26 southern and western counties, including three Ulster counties) and Northern Ireland (consisting of the remaining six counties of the province). A truce between the belligerents began on 11 July 1921, ending the fighting in most of Ireland. It was preceded by Belfast's Bloody Sunday, a day of violence in which twenty people were killed. In early 1922, there was a resurgence of sectarian violence in Belfast, including the McMahon killings and the Arnon Street killings. In May 1922 the IRA launched their Northern Offensive. There were clashes near the new Irish border, at Clones and the Pettigo/Belleek area. Also in May 1922, the new government of Northern Ireland implemented the Special Powers Act (also known as the "Flogging Act"), interning suspected IRA members, and imposing a nighttime curfew across the six counties of Northern Ireland. The outbreak of the Irish Civil War in the south on 28 June 1922 diverted the IRA from its campaign against the Northern government, and violence in Northern Ireland fell sharply.

== Background ==
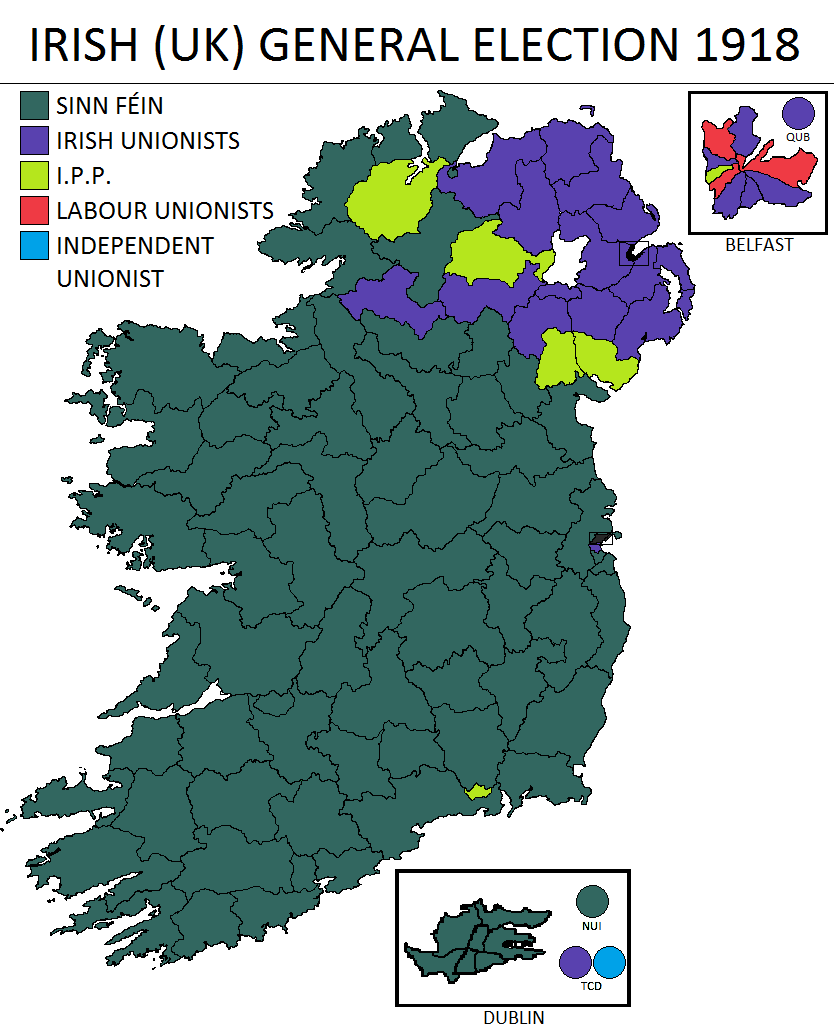
Results of the 1918 UK general election in Ireland, showing seats won by Irish nationalists in green, and seats won by Unionists in blue

In the early 20th century, all of Ireland was part of the United Kingdom. A majority of Ireland's people were Catholics and Irish nationalists who wanted either self-government ("home rule") or independence. However, in the north-east of Ireland, Protestants and Unionists were the majority, largely as a result of the 17th century colonization of the northern province of Ulster - the Plantation of Ulster. Home Rule for Ireland had been an issue for many years – in 1886 the first Home Rule Bill was introduced in the British House of Parliament. Ulster Unionists resisted that Bill with violence – 31 to 50 people were killed in ongoing riots during June/July 1886 (see the 1886 Belfast riots). The second Home Rule Bill was introduced in 1893, much violence ensued with Catholic workmen being driven from their jobs in the Belfast shipyards. Riots occurred on a regular basis in Belfast during the 19th century, as far back as 1815. Serious rioting took place in 1835 (two rioters shot dead), 1841, 1843, 1857, 1864, 1872, 1880,1884 and 1898. In 1912 Belfast was the scene of "fullscale sectarian rioting" which caused further segregation between the Catholic and Protestant communities.

Home rule for all of Ireland was set to take place with the Government of Ireland Act 1914 (Home Rule Act). During the Home Rule Crisis of 1912–14, Unionists threatened to oppose any Irish government with violence if necessary, forming a paramilitary group: the Ulster Volunteers or Ulster Volunteer Force (UVF) and arming themselves (see Larne gun-running). On 20 March 1914, the Curragh Mutiny occurred in which British Army officers vowed to resign or be dismissed if they were ordered to enforce the Home Rule Act. Ulster unionists argued that if Home Rule could not be stopped, then all or part of Ulster should be excluded from it (see Government of Ireland Act 1920). The Act divided Ireland along established county lines (see Partition of Ireland), creating two self-governing territories within the United Kingdom: Northern Ireland (with Belfast as its capital) and Southern Ireland (1921–22) (with Dublin as its capital). Six of the nine counties in the province of Ulster – Antrim, Down, Armagh, Londonderry, Tyrone and Fermanagh comprised the maximum area Unionists believed they could dominate. Generally, Irish nationalists opposed partition, in the 1918 Irish general election five of the nine Counties of Ulster returned Irish republican party Sinn Féin and Irish nationalist (Irish Parliamentary Party) majorities. Although Counties Fermanagh and Tyrone returns showed nationalist majorities, they were included into Northern Ireland.

By the end of the First World War (during which the 1916 Easter Rising had taken place), most Irish nationalists now wanted full independence rather than home rule. In the last general election to be held throughout Ireland (the 1918 Irish general election) Sinn Féin won the overwhelming majority of Irish seats. In line with its manifesto, Sinn Féin's elected members boycotted the British parliament and founded a separate Irish parliament (Dáil Éireann), declaring the establishment of an independent Irish Republic covering the whole island. However, Unionists won the most seats in the area that became Northern Ireland and affirmed their continuing loyalty to the United Kingdom. Many Irish republicans blamed the British establishment for the sectarian divisions in Ireland, and believed that Ulster Unionist defiance would fade after British rule was ended. The British authorities outlawed the Dáil in September 1919, and a guerrilla conflict developed as the Irish Republican Army (1919–1922) began to attack British forces. This conflict became known as the Irish War of Independence.

Another contributing factor to the outbreak of communal violence was the severe economic recession that followed the end of World War I. Many workers were made redundant, working hours were reduced and many returning soldiers were unable to find work. Some returning Protestant soldiers felt bitterness against the many Catholics who had remained at home and now held jobs. At the same time, fiery political speeches were made by Unionist leaders and weapons were stockpiled by Ulster loyalists and Irish nationalists. Other events which contributed to the outbreak of violence were the assassinations of senior British Army officers, policemen and politicians: RIC Divisional Commissioner Lt Col Gerald Smyth (July 1920), RIC District Inspector Swanzy (August 1920), Belfast City Councilman William J. Twaddell (May 1922), and British Army Field Marshall Sir Henry Wilson (the Military Advisor to the Ulster Government). IRA volunteers Reginald Dunne and Joseph O'Sullivan (both of whom had served as British soldiers in World War I) were apprehended and found guilty of Wilson's murder. They were hanged on 10 August 1922.

In June 1920, the Ulster Unionist Council remobilized the UVF with one of the leading organizers being the future, long term Prime Minister of Northern Ireland, Basil Brooke (1943–1963). In 1920, the Commander in Chief in Ireland, Nevil Macready, warned against a rearmed UVF that "would undoubtedly consist entirely of Protestants, and no amount of so called loyalty is likely to restrain them if the religious question becomes acute...the arming of the Protestant population of Ulster will mean the outbreak of civil war in this country, as distinct from the attempted suppression of rebellion with which we are engaged at present." The British Prime Minister, Lloyd George, had around the same time formed the Black and Tans and Auxiliary Division made up of returning soldiers to help bolster the RIC, but they quickly became notorious for their actions against nationalists.

=== Sectarian strife ===
As the Irish War of Independence spread northwards into Ulster, sectarian clashes took place, which would spark a period of fierce sectarian fighting that overshadowed all the riots and clashes of the preceding century. In January 1920, local elections took place for the first time with the single transferable vote form of proportional representation. The British Prime Minister had hoped that this system would show a lack of support for Sinn Féin, and this view had vindication after Sinn Féin won only 550 seats compared to 1,256 for all the other parties, including the Nationalist Party. However, Unionists became dismayed when an electoral pact saw Sinn Féin and the Nationalist Party gaining control of ten urban councils within the area due to become Northern Ireland. In Derry, Alderman Hugh O'Doherty became the first Catholic mayor of the city. His inaugural speech did little to allay the fears of the unionist population of the city: "Ireland's right to determine her own destiny will come about whether the Protestants of Ulster like it or not". Irish nationalist newspaper the Derry Journal heralded the fall of unionist control over Londonderry Corporation, declaring "No Surrender – Citadel Conquered". In another local election in June 1920, thirteen rural councils in Ulster came under joint Nationalist-Sinn Féin control, as did Tyrone and Fermanagh county councils. Unionist representation in Belfast fell from 52 to 29 as a result of the good showing of the Belfast Labour Party. These events and the nationalist triumphalism that came with them encouraged their hopes that partition would be ditched, whilst compounding the feeling of abandonment amongst unionists, especially in Derry.

== Troubles ==
=== Derry 1920 ===
Sectarian strife began in Derry in April 1920 when an hour-long violent confrontation between Protestants and Catholics erupted on Long Tower Street, as republican prisoners were being transported to Bishop Street gaol. On the 18th of April, shots were fired into the Bogside as Catholics rioted in the city center, the RIC carried out a bayonet charge. On 14 May more trouble ensued as the RIC and IRA engaged in a four-hour gun battle, which resulted in the shooting death of the local chief of the RIC Special Branch. In response, loyalists reformed the UVF in the city and mounted roadblocks, Catholics crossing Carlisle Bridge were mistreated, resulting in one who had returned injured from the war being killed. On 13 June, the UVF attacked Catholics at Prehen Wood, which sparked intense rioting in the city, where Long Tower Street and Bishop Street met.

The violence that broke out in Derry continued for a week in June 1920. At least nineteen people were killed or fatally wounded during this time: 14 Catholics and five Protestants. On 18 June, rioting had spread into the mainly-Protestant Waterside area of the city, where Catholic homes were burnt. The UVF, with the aid of ex-servicemen, seized control of the Guildhall and Diamond, whilst also repulsing an IRA counter-attack. Protestants living in the mainly-Catholic Bogside would be burnt out of their houses by the IRA, with two shot dead. Loyalists fired from the Fountain neighborhood into adjoining Catholic streets. The IRA, armed with rifles and machine-guns, occupied St Columb's College, which became the scene of intense gunfire. In response to the serious situation in Derry the General Headquarters (GHQ) of the IRA sent two of its leading Officers in support: Peadar Clancy and Dick McKee.

Eventually, on 23 June 1920, 1,500 British troops arrived in Derry to restore order, martial law was declared in the city, and a destroyer was anchored on the Foyle overlooking the Guildhall. The presence of the military did little to stifle the violence as riots, shootings, and assassinations continued. Six people (four Catholics, two Protestants) were killed in the last week of June, after the army's deployment. According to some sources, six Catholics were killed in the Bogside by heavy machine gun fire from soldiers. By the end of this period of trouble forty people had been killed.

=== Older Belfast shipyard worker "clearances" ===
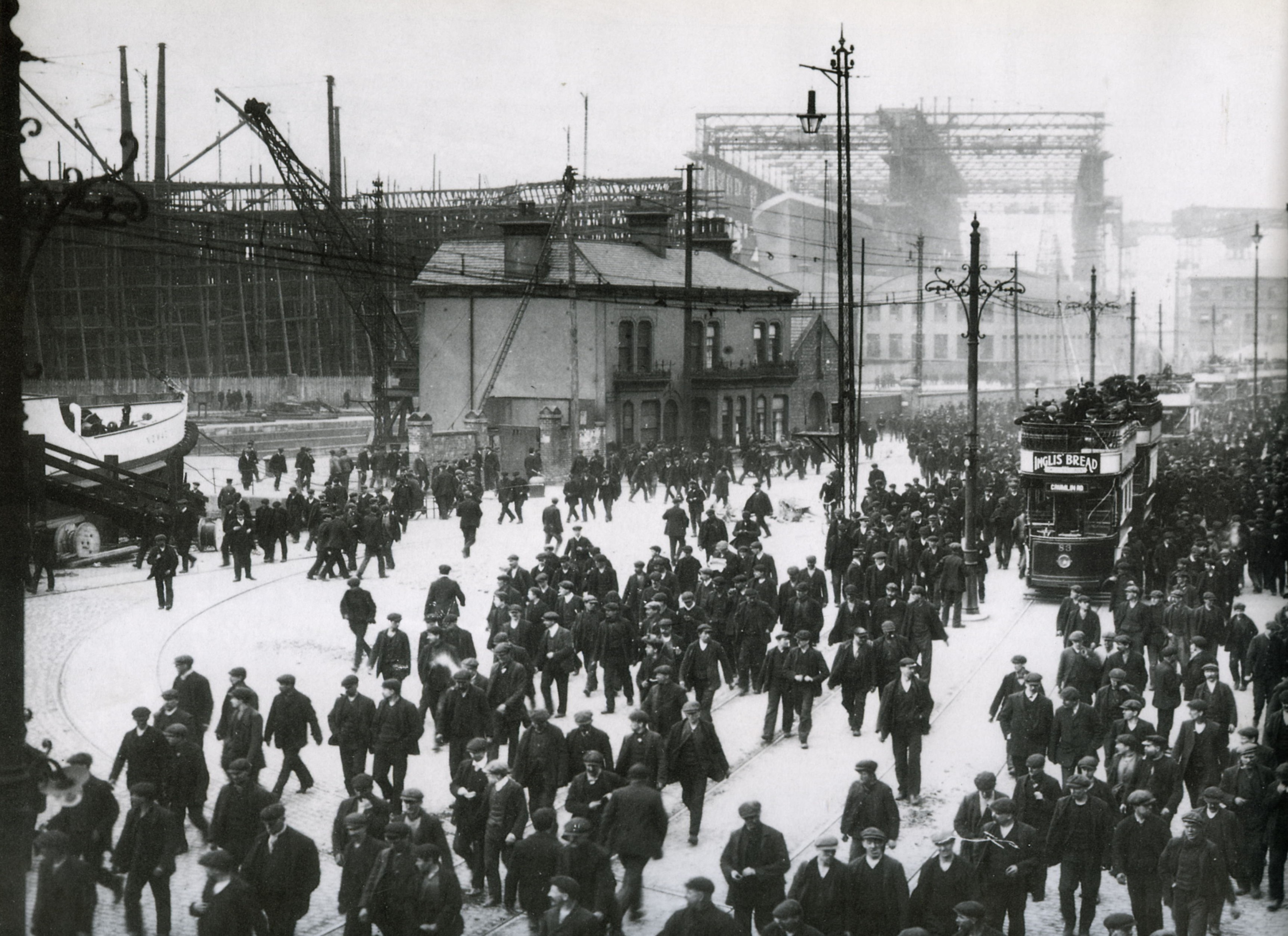
Belfast's Harland & Wolff shipyards in 1911

The large-scale violence of July 1920 - June 1922 was preceded by similar actions in June 1898 and July 1912. The 1898, 1912 and 1920 "clearances" were made all of Catholic shipyard workers, Socialists and Protestant trade unionists. In the 1898 "clearances", approximately 700 Catholic workers were driven from shipyards, linen mills and other businesses where Protestants were in the majority. The 1912 clearances resulted in many assaults with thousands of Catholics and Protestant being forcibly removed from their jobs. The events that triggered the 1912 workplace expulsions were the introduction of the Home Rule for Ireland Act in April 1912 and another incident which took place in Castledawson, County Londonderry when a member of the Ancient Order of Hibernians snatched a British flag from the hands of a young boy – resulting in rioting. When the news spread to Belfast 2,400 Catholics and some 600 Protestant trade unionists were driven (often violently) from their places of work. In the 1912 violence, the directors of Harland and Wolff shipyards decided to suspend operations "in view of the brutal assaults on individual workmen and the intimidation of others.".

=== Belfast Pogrom ===
On The Twelfth (12 July) 1920 (an annual Ulster Protestant celebration), Ulster Unionist Party leader Edward Carson made a speech to thousands of Orangemen in Finaghy, near Belfast. He said "I am sick of words without actions" and he warned the British government that if it refused to adequately protect Unionists from the IRA, they would take matters into their own hands. He also linked Irish republicanism with socialism and the Catholic Church. Many Catholics asserted that Carson's rhetoric was partly responsible for the start of what they believed was a pogrom being carried out against Belfast's Catholic minority, referring to it as the Belfast Pogrom. At this time in Belfast, Catholics made up a quarter of the city's population but accounted for up two-thirds of those killed, they suffered 80% of the property destruction and comprised 80% of refugees. Despite the roles played by state forces, particularly the USC, most unionist historians say the term "pogrom" is misleading, claiming the police violence was not co-ordinated.

On 21 July 1920, when shipyard workers returned after the Twelfth holidays, a meeting of "all Unionist and Protestant workers" was called during lunch hour that day by the Belfast Protestant Association at the Workman and Clarke yard. With over 5,000 workers present, speeches were made, demanding the expulsion of all "non-loyal" workers. Hours of intimidation and violence followed, in which Loyalists drove 8,000 co-workers from Harland and Wolff other shipyards, industrial sites and several linen mills. All of the removed workers were either Catholics or Protestant labour activists. Some of them were beaten, or thrown into the water and pelted with rivets as they swam for their lives. Three days of rioting followed, in which eleven Catholics and eight Protestants were killed and hundreds of people were wounded.

Around the Falls-Shankill interface, seven Catholics and two Protestants were killed, mostly by soldiers who were attempting to disperse rioters in the area. Several of those killed were ex-servicemen and one was a Redemptorist friar who was shot by a bullet fired from a passing military patrol through a window of Clonard Monastery. A Loyalist mob attempted to burn down a Catholic convent on Newtownards Road; soldiers guarding the building responded opened fire, wounding 15 Protestants, three of them fatally.

At other workplaces in Belfast, expulsions continued for several days, and those expelled included several hundred female textile workers. Catholics and Socialists were driven out of other large firms such as Mackies Foundry and Sirocco Engineering Works. According to the Catholic Protection Committee, 11,000 Catholic shipyard, factory and mill workers had been expelled from their jobs, a tenth of Belfast's Catholic population. The leader of the Ulster Unionist Party and the soon to be Prime Minister of Northern Ireland, Sir James Craig, made his feelings on the expulsions clear when he visited the shipyards: "Do I approve of the actions you boys have taken in the past? I say yes".

By August 1920 Catholics were no longer employed in the shipyards and material damage valued at one half million pounds had been done. The expulsion of thousands of Catholic workers from the shipyards and other Belfast workplaces were followed by retaliatory attacks against Protestant workers as they were returning home from work, starting a cycle of communal violence which continued for over two years. One of the more brutal attacks on returning workers occurred on 22 November 1921 when bombs were thrown into a tram carrying workers from the Workman, Clark and Co. shipyard – three workers were killed and 16 wounded.

The now unemployed Catholic shipyard workers continued their attacks on Protestants as they returned home after work. In late November 1921 multiple trams carrying shipyard workers were attacked, killing eight Protestant workers. Loyalist retaliation resulted in fifteen Nationalists killed in one day alone (22 November 1921). St. Matthew's church in the Catholic enclave of Ballymacarrett came under sustained attack and in March 1922, nearby St Matthew's Primary School was also subjected to a bombing attack.

=== Peace lines ===
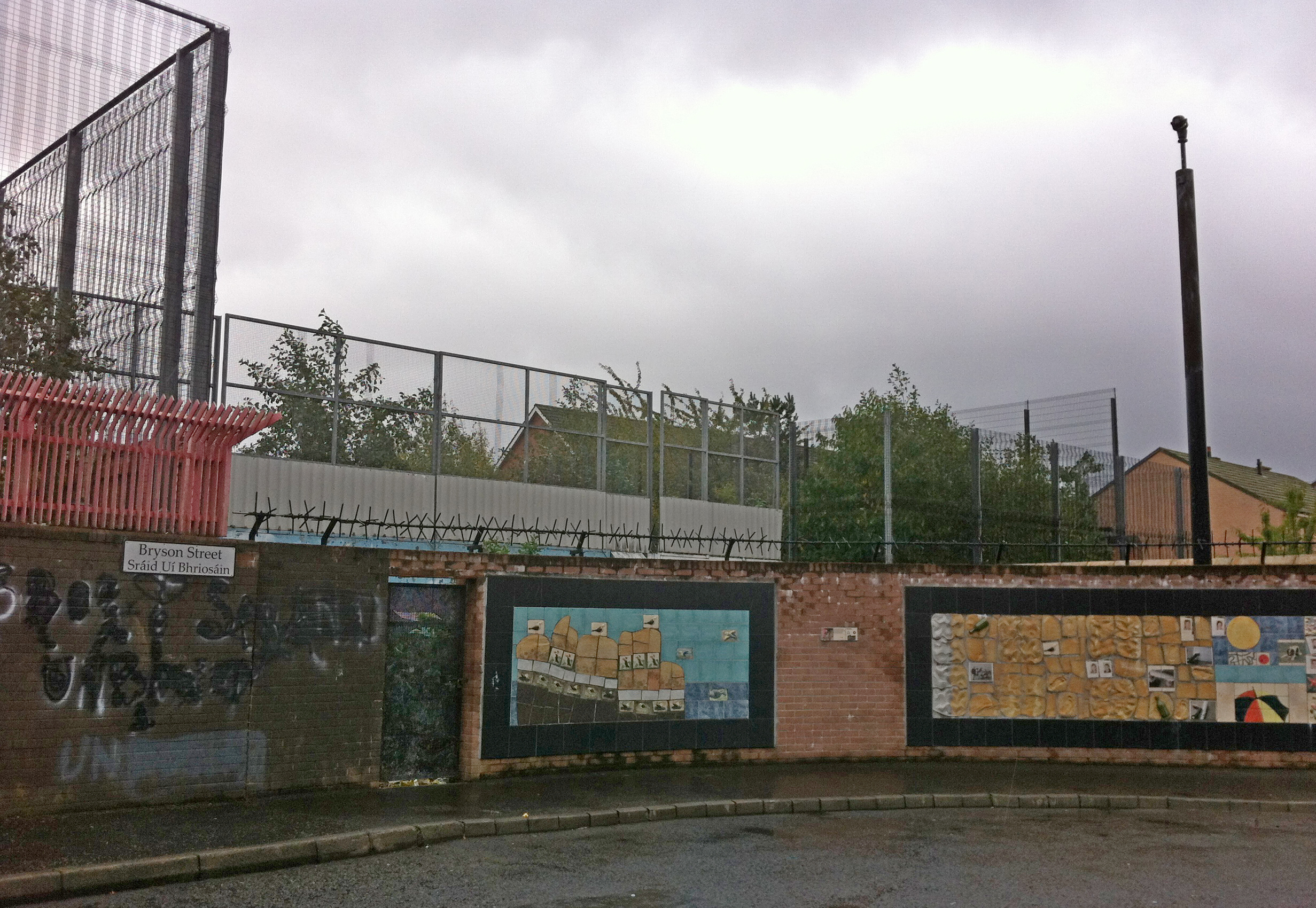
A peace wall in Short Strand dividing it from a Protestant area

In the 1920s, temporary Peace lines (walls) were built in the area adjacent to the Harland & Wolff shipyards in Belfast and made permanent in 1969, following the outbreak of the 1969 Northern Ireland riots. Today, the Ballymacarrett/Short Strand areas of Belfast remain basically segregated and violence still occurs. The Battle of St Matthew's or Battle of Short Strand was a gun battle that took place on the night of 27–28 June 1970 resulting in three deaths and at least 26 wounded. Major sectarian clashes were common in the shipyard area into the 21st century – 2002 Short Strand clashes and 2011 Northern Ireland riots.

=== Belfast boycott ===
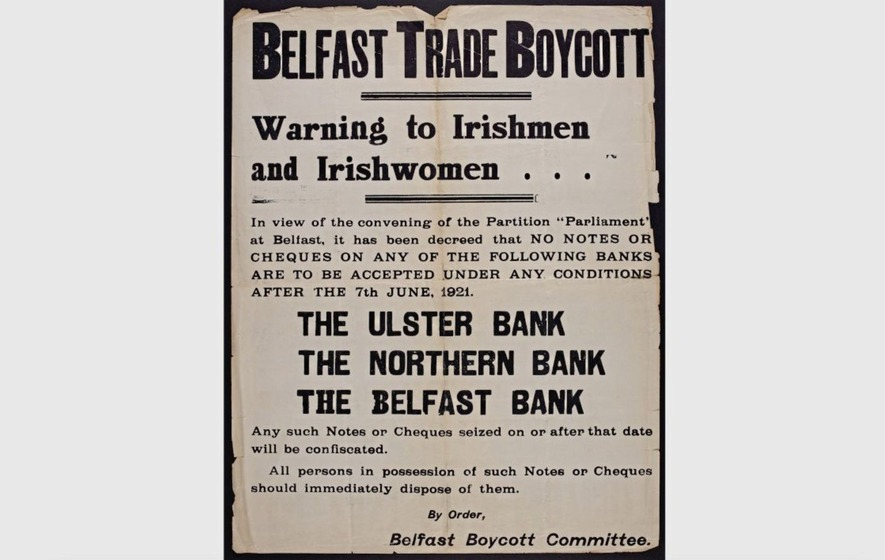
A notice from the Belfast Boycott Committee

In response to the expulsions of Catholic workers in Belfast and requirements for employment (political loyalty tests and the requirement to sign loyalty declarations to the British Government), northern Sinn Féin members called for the boycott of Unionist-owned businesses and banks in the city. Despite some opposition, the Dáil and its cabinet approved the boycott in August 1920, imposing a boycott of goods from Belfast and a withdrawal of funds from Belfast-based banks. The County Council of Tyrone immediately supported the boycott declaring that all businesses should stop trading with Belfast. In January 1921, the Dáil agreed to support the boycott more fully, providing 35,000 pounds to the campaign. Joseph MacDonagh (brother of executed 1916 Easter Rising leader Thomas MacDonagh) oversaw the implementation of the boycott, by May 1921 there were 360 Belfast Boycott committees throughout Ireland, but it was enforced intermittently.

The boycott was enforced by the IRA, who halted trains and lorries and destroyed goods from Belfast businesses. One example of a train hold up occurred on 10 July 1921 between Pomeroy and Carrickmore, County Tyrone when a mail train was burned with all of its contents. The female members of Cumann na mBan played major roles in holding up trains and the seizure/destruction of northern produced goods/Unionist leaning newspapers. Eithne Coyle held up several trains bound from County Tyrone to County Donegal. However, the boycott was effectively enforced only in County Monaghan, primarily due to its location near the newly-proclaimed border and Belfast. The following declaration was signed by all of Monaghan's Catholic commercial traders: "We the undersigned traders of Monaghan town, hereby pledge ourselves not to deal directly or indirectly with Belfast Unionist firms or traders until such time as adequate reparation has been made to the Catholic victims of the recent Belfast pogrom".

The boycott had little impact on the north's three main industries – agriculture, shipbuilding and linen – as they were mainly shipped to markets outside Ireland. In March 1922, the Craig-Collins pact had both leaders agree that Craig would try to have Catholic workers regain the jobs lost in the shipyard clearances of 1920. Collins agreed to end IRA actions against the police and military in the six counties and to end the boycott. The Belfast Boycott eventually ended following the signing of the Anglo-Irish Treaty of December 1921 and the onset of the Irish Civil War (June 1922 – May 1923).

=== Banbridge and Dromore burnings ===
On 17 July 1920, the IRA assassinated British Army Lieutenant-Colonel Gerald Smyth in Cork. He had told police officers to shoot civilians who did not immediately obey orders. Smyth reassured the police that they: "...may make mistakes occasionally and innocent persons may be shot...that cannot be helped, and you are bound to get the right participants sometimes... The more you shoot the better I will like you, and I assure you, no policeman will get into trouble for shooting any man."

Smyth was from a wealthy Protestant family in the northern town of Banbridge, County Down and his large funeral was held there on 21 July, the same day as the Belfast shipyard expulsions. After Smyth's funeral, about 3,000 Loyalists took to the streets. Many Catholic homes and businesses were attacked, burned and looted, despite police being present. A large mob of Loyalists, some armed, attacked and tried to break into the home of a republican family. The father fired on the crowd, killing a Protestant man. Hundreds of Catholic factory workers were also driven from their jobs, and many Catholic families fled Banbridge. Calm was restored after the British Army was deployed into the town.

On 23 July 1920, sectarian motivated riots occurred in Dromore, County Down. An estimated crowd of 500 attacked Catholic homes, the Catholic parochial house and looted businesses. During the rioting, one member of the Orange Order was shot dead, it was determined that the bullet had been fired by the police trying to disperse the mob. At the end of these two days of violence, virtually the entire Catholic population of both Banbridge and Dromore were forced to flee their homes. Sectarian intimidation and violence continued in Banbridge and areas north of the town (the Bann Valley) throughout August and September 1920 with approximately 1,000 more Catholics being expelled from their jobs.

=== Lisburn burnings and Belfast violence ===
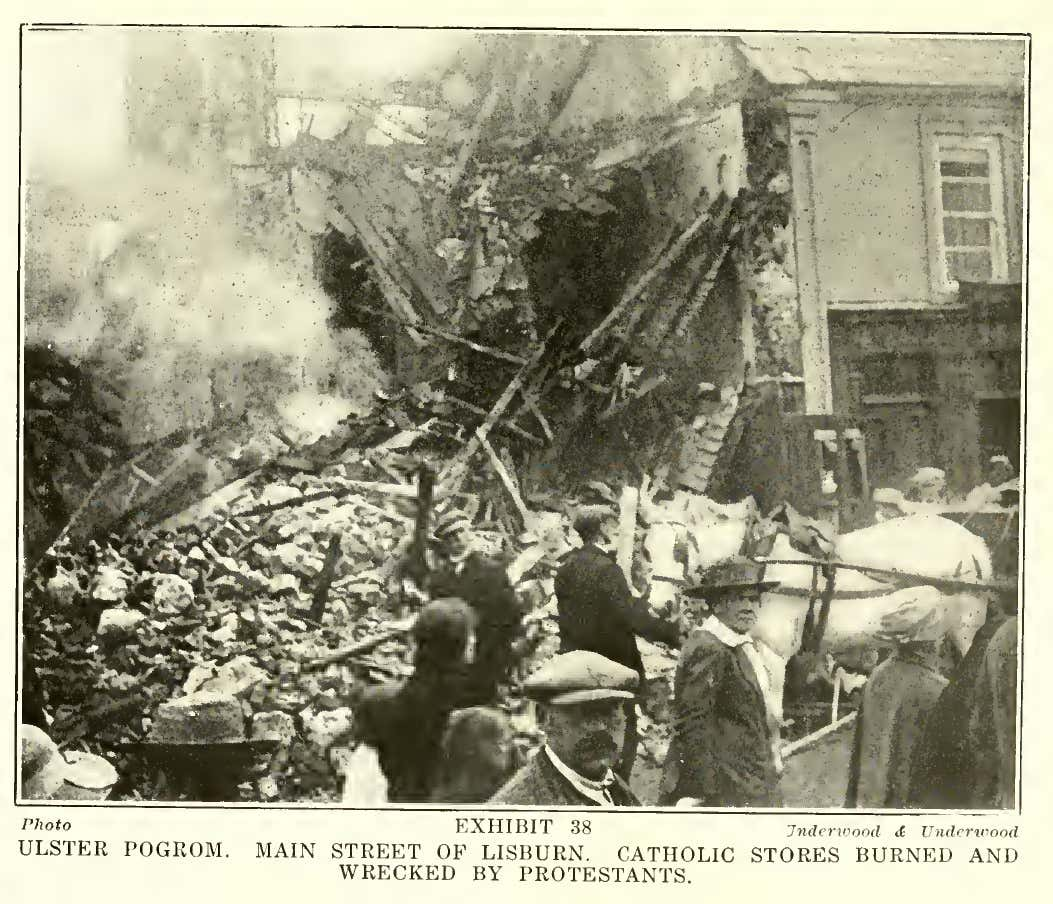
Catholic-owned businesses destroyed by loyalists in Lisburn

Sectarian attacks also occurred in Lisburn, County Antrim (a town near Belfast) in response to the murder of Colonel Smyth. On 24 July 1920 rioters attacked Catholic owned businesses, homes and the Catholic convent of the Sacred Heart.

On 22 August 1920, the IRA assassinated RIC Inspector Oswald Swanzy in the Market Square of Lisburn, as worshippers left Sunday service. A coroner's inquest in Cork had held Swanzy (among others) responsible for the murder of Tomás Mac Curtain, Cork's Irish republican Lord Mayor. The commander of Belfast IRA 1st Battalion Joe McKelvey helped to organize the attack on Swanzy (the killers were IRA men from Cork).

Over the next three days and nights (in attacks likened to ethnic cleansing), Loyalist crowds looted and burned almost every Catholic business in the town, and attacked Catholic homes. There is evidence the UVF helped organise the burnings. Rioters attacked firemen who tried to save Catholic property, and attacked the lorries of British soldiers sent to help the police. A Catholic pub owner later died of gunshot wounds and a charred body was found in the ruins of a factory.

Lisburn was likened to "a bombarded town in France" during the First World War. A third of the town's Catholics (about 1,000 people) fled Lisburn. The attacks in Lisburn, Dromore and Banbridge led to a long-term decline of the Catholic populations of those towns. Damage in Lisburn was estimated at 810,000 pounds (in 1920 currency). Seven men were arrested and charged with rioting – five were convicted but appealed their convictions and were released.

Daily News correspondent Hugh Martin was quoted on the attacks in Lisburn and Banbridge: "This was no mere faction fight. There can be no doubt that it was a deliberate and organised attempt to, not by any means the first in history, to drive the Catholic Irish out of North-East Ulster."

During the last weekend of August 1920 sectarian violence was also widespread in nearby Belfast. The Belfast Telegraph newspaper reported 17 people dead and over 169 seriously wounded. Within four days of the killing of District Inspector Swanzy in Lisburn at least 100 homes of Nationalists were burned in Belfast. Between August 1920 and April 1922 at least four large scale clashes occurred in the small Belfast Nationalist enclave known as Marrowbone (adjacent to Ardoyne). Initially crowds of armed Unionists attempted to burn the local Catholic church. During this time approximately 20 residents of the Marrowbone and rioters were killed (six Nationalists were killed in Marrowbone on 28 August 1920), dozens of people were wounded, and multiple homes burned.

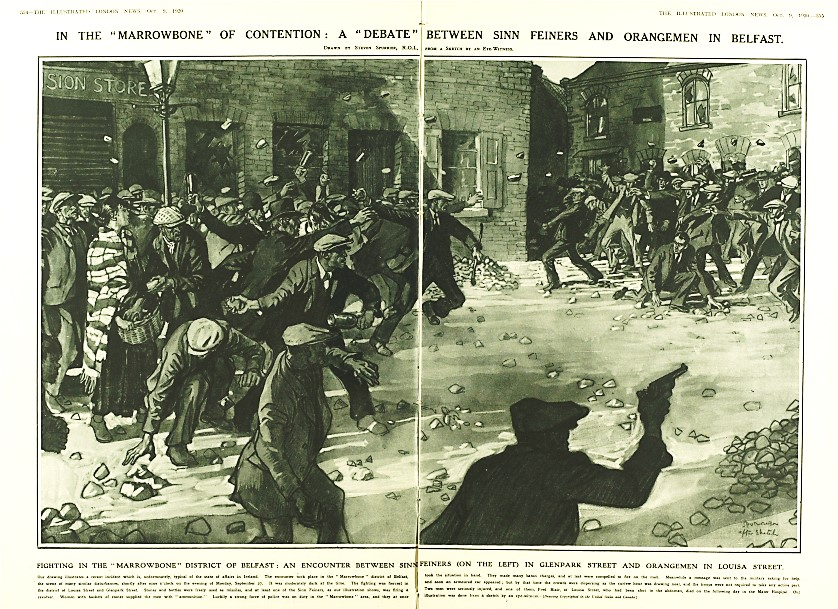
Battle of Marrowbone September 1920

=== Forming the Ulster Special Constabulary ===
In September 1920, Unionist leader James Craig wrote to the British government demanding that a special constabulary be recruited from the ranks of the loyalist, paramilitary organization the UVF. He warned: "Loyalist leaders now feel the situation is so desperate that unless the Government will take immediate action, it may be advisable for them to see what steps can be taken towards a system of organized reprisals against the rebels". By 1922 senior members of the RIC (two head Constables and District Inspector John William Nixon) were members of the Belfast police reprisal squad. The Ulster Special Constabulary (USC), commonly called the "B-Specials" or "B Men" was formed in October 1920 and, in the words of historian Michael Hopkinson, "amounted to an officially approved UVF". Irish nationalists saw the founding of this almost wholly Protestant force as the arming of the majority against the Catholic minority.

In late October 1920, Joe Devlin, the MP for West Belfast voiced his opinion on the impartiality of the newly formed USC:

And it is to the mercy of these men that 500,000 of we Belfast Catholics are to be left. The Protestants are to be armed, for we would not touch your special constabularyship with a forty-foot pole. Their pogrom is to be made less difficult. Instead of pavingstones and sticks they are to be given rifles. That is how civil war is to be prevented in Ireland and in Ulster. It is impossible to speak with patience of what is going on over there. Englishmen have no conception of it; if they had they would hide their heads in shame.

The USC consisted of 32,000 men divided into four sections: A Specials were fulltime and paid. B Specials were part time and unpaid and the C Specials were unpaid and nonuniform reservists. Under the terms of the Truce between the IRA and the British (11 July 1921), the USC was demobilized, and the IRA was given official recognition while peace talks were ongoing. Although the Truce forbade both sides from forming any new military units, by November 1921 a new Unionist organization was formed - the Imperial Guards. With a claim of 21,000 members, their goal was to have 150,000 members within a few months. The Imperial Guards were closely associated with the Ulster Unionist Labour Association and the Ulster Ex-servicemen's Association with many of their membership coming from Belfast shipyard workers. By the fall of 1922 most members of the Imperial Guards had been integrated into the C Specials. After policing became the responsibility of the newly formed Northern government, the B Specials of the USC were again mobilized. Maintaining the USC was costly, in fiscal year 1922-1923 the British Treasury allocated £850,000 to cover the cost of the USC but the costs of additional vehicles and armaments brought the final figure to £1,829,000. The USC or "Specials" were used in every decade of the 20th century up to its disbandment in May 1970.

=== Spring and summer 1921 ===
After a lull, the conflict in the north intensified again in the spring of 1921. On 1 April, the IRA attacked an RIC barracks and a British Army post in Derry city with gunfire and grenades, killing two RIC officers. On 10 April, the IRA ambushed a group of Special Constables outside a church in Creggan, County Armagh, killing one and wounding others. In reprisal, the USC attacked nationalists and burned their houses in Killylea (where the dead Special Constables came from). On 10 June, the IRA shot three RIC officers on Belfast's Falls Road, fatally wounding Constable James Glover. He had been targeted because the IRA suspected him of being part of a group of police involved in the sectarian killings of Catholics. These attacks sparked violence by Loyalists. Belfast suffered three days of sectarian rioting and shooting incidents, during which at least 14 people were killed; including three Catholics taken from their homes and killed by uniformed police. About 150 Catholic families were forced out of their homes at that time. Violence continued throughout the summer of 1921 with August being particularly bad in Belfast: 23 people were killed (12 Protestants and 11 Catholics).

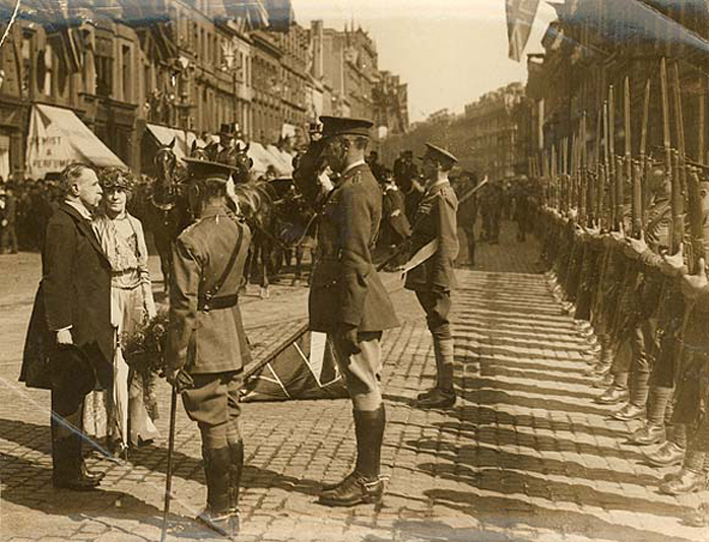
The Lord Lieutenant inspecting troops in Belfast at the opening of the Northern Ireland Parliament, June 1921

=== Partition of Ireland ===
The Government of Ireland Act came into force on 3 May 1921, thus partitioning Ireland under British law. Elections for the Northern and Southern parliaments were held on 24 May. Unionists won most of the seats in Northern Ireland, while republicans treated it as an election for the Dáil. The Northern Ireland parliament first met on 7 June and formed a devolved government, headed by Unionist Party leader James Craig. Irish nationalist and republican members refused to attend. The following day, the IRA ambushed a USC patrol at Carrogs, near Newry. In reprisal, the Special Constables went to the nearest Catholic home and fatally shot two civilian men. The IRA then fired on the USC men from a nearby hill, killing one.

=== Opening of the Northern Parliament ===
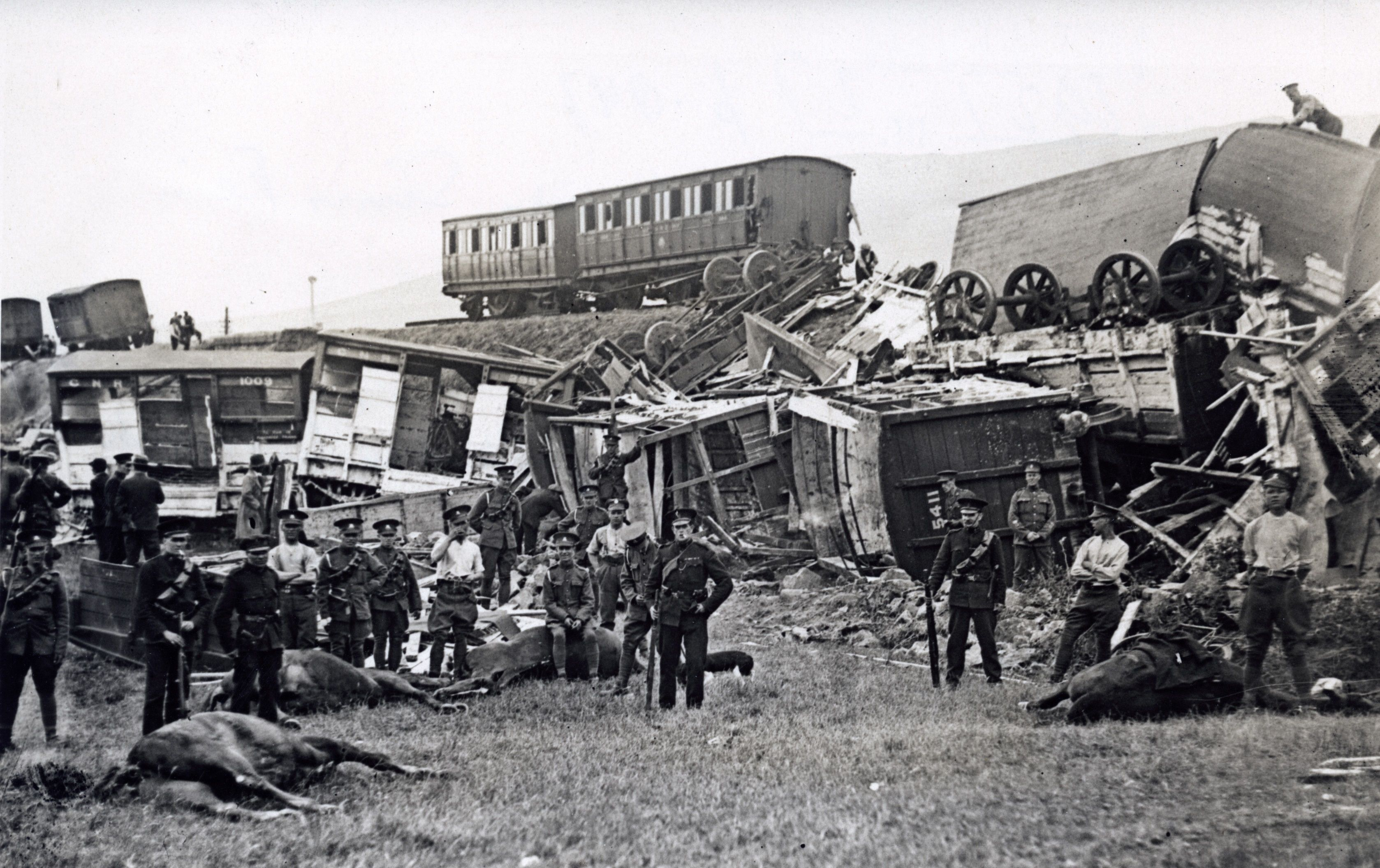
The Adavoyle train derailment

King George V addressed the ceremonial opening of the Northern Parliament on 22 June 1921. He called for "all Irishmen to pause, to stretch out the hand of forbearance and conciliation". On 24 June, a train carrying the king's military escort, the 10th Royal Hussars, was derailed by an IRA bomb at Adavoyle, County Armagh. Five soldiers and a train guard were killed in the derailment and two railway workers were seriously injured. Forty horses were killed, many of them had recently returned from World War I. Patrick McAteer, a local farm worker, was fatally wounded on the same day roughly half a mile from the ambush site by soldiers when he failed to halt when challenged. On 6 July, disguised Special Constables raided homes at Altnaveigh, County Armagh, and summarily killed four Catholic civilian men.

=== Belfast's Bloody Sunday ===
On 9 July 1921, a ceasefire (or truce) was agreed between representatives of the Irish Republic and the British government, to begin at noon on 11 July. Many Loyalists condemned the truce as a 'sell-out' to Republicans. While violence may have ceased in the south of Ireland, the birth of Northern Ireland in 1921 saw another wave of intense sectarian violence in Belfast. This period of time saw the highest number of casualties since the Shipyard Clearances of the previous summer. Hours before the ceasefire was to begin, police launched a raid against Republicans in west Belfast. The IRA ambushed them on Raglan Street, killing an officer (Constable Thomas Conlon) and wounding others. This sparked a day of violence known as Belfast's Bloody Sunday. Protestant loyalists attacked Catholic neighbourhoods in west Belfast, burning over 150 Catholic homes and businesses. This led to sectarian clashes and gun battles between police and Catholic nationalists. While the IRA was involved in some of the fighting, another Irish nationalist group, the Hibernians were involved on the Catholic side. The USC were alleged to have driven through Catholic enclaves firing indiscriminately. Twenty eight people were killed or fatally wounded (including twelve Catholics and six Protestants) from the beginning of the truce (which began at noon on 11 July 1921) and into the following week. Almost 200 houses were badly damaged or destroyed, most of them being Catholic homes.

With the ceasefire a strict curfew was enforced in Belfast and the Commandant of the IRA's 2nd Northern Division, Eoin O'Duffy, was sent to Belfast to liaise with the authorities and to try to maintain the truce. With the tacit consent of the RIC, in order to restore order, O'Duffy organized IRA patrols in Catholic neighborhoods and announced that IRA offensive actions would end. Both Protestants and Catholics saw the truce as a victory for Republicans. Loyalists "were particularly appalled by the sight of policemen and soldiers meeting IRA officers on a semi-official basis".

=== Troubles elsewhere in Ulster ===
During this time period violence occurred in all nine counties of Ulster. Outside of the major cities/towns many attacks occurred in smaller/rural communities and were mostly limited to attacks on RIC barracks, ambushes, sniping and raids for weapons. Some large-scale attacks did occur, often involving up to 200 IRA members. On 9 May 1920 approximately 200 IRA volunteers under the command of Armagh native Frank Aiken (Officer Commanding 4th Northern Division) attacked the RIC barracks in Newtownhamilton, County Armagh. After a two-hour firefight, the IRA breached the barracks wall with explosives and stormed the building.

Another large scale battle took place on 1 June 1920 when at least 200 IRA volunteers led by Roger McCorley attacked the RIC barracks in Crossgar, County Down. They opened fire on the building, wounding two officers, and attempted to breach the walls with explosives before withdrawing. In early 1921, western Donegal had seasoned Volunteers under the command of Peadar O'Donnell. During this time the west Donegal Flying Column was responsible for numerous successful attacks on RIC barracks and troop train ambushes. On 12 January 1921, the column attacked a train carrying troops with multiple military deaths reported.

Attacks and reprisals were common. On 25 October 1920 (after a successful raid for arms/ammunition took place at the RIC barracks in Tempo, County Fermanagh), a RIC officer was seriously wounded. Several hours later members of the UVF fired into a group of civilians in Tempo, killing one and wounding another. On 22 February 1921 in the small town of Mountcharles, County Donegal, the IRA attacked a mixed patrol of military and police, one RIC officer was killed and a soldier was wounded during a 30 minute exchange of gunfire. Later that day, police and Black and Tans in Donegal town fired shots into buildings, destroyed shops and licensed premises. After midnight a mixed force of RIC, Black and Tans, USC and military returned to Mountcharles destroying businesses and setting fire to homes. That night one woman was shot and killed in Mountcharles. On 22 March 1921, in retaliation for the burning of Catholic owned homes in Rosslea, County Fermanagh (21 February 1921) two members of the USC were shot dead. The IRA also conducted widespread attacks on Protestant owned homes in Rosslea, burning at least two to the ground and damaging many others. The following month, the IRA attacked the homes of up to sixteen Special Constables in the Rosslea district, killing three and wounding several others.

In Ulster during the spring of 1921, numerically superior British/Unionist forces faced a poorly armed IRA. The situation in County Tyrone at that time highlights the problems faced by the IRA when confronted with large numbers of military, police and Special Constabulary: "By the early spring of 1921 there were 3,515 A and 11,000 B Specials in the six county area. At the time of the truce there were about 14 reasonably active IRA companies in Tyrone, each with around 50 men, but only half a dozen in each company were armed. Therefore, just over 100 poorly armed Volunteers faced a combined force of almost 3,000 heavily armed, paramilitary police comprising RIC, A and B Specials". The British Army was also represented in Tyrone with a 650 man Rifle Brigade based in the border town of Strabane, County Tyrone. Some areas of Ulster saw little violence – only three IRA volunteers were killed in County Cavan during the war. For a more complete listing of the troubles in Ulster during this time period see Timeline of the Irish War of Independence.

=== Anglo-Irish Treaty ===
The post-ceasefire talks led to the Anglo-Irish Treaty, signed on 6 December 1921 by representatives of the British government and the Irish Republic. Under the Treaty, 'Southern Ireland' would leave the UK and become a self-governing dominion: the Irish Free State. Northern Ireland's parliament could vote it in or out of the Free State, and a Boundary Commission could then redraw or confirm the provisional border. The Dáil narrowly approved the Treaty on 7 January 1922 (by a vote of 64 to 57), but it caused a serious split in the Irish nationalist movement (eventually leading the Irish Civil War). The anti-Treaty side argued that the Treaty copper-fastened partition; the pro-Treaty side argued that the proposed Boundary Commission would transfer large swathes of Northern Ireland to the Free State, leaving the remaining territory too small to be viable. The pro-Treatyites formed a Provisional Government, headed by Michael Collins, to administer Southern Ireland until the Free State was established (6 December 1922). While speaking to northern IRA officers shortly before his death in August 1922, Collins made clear his feelings on cooperating with the Northern Ireland government and the Anglo-Irish Treaty: "I will use the political arm against Craig so long as it is of use. If that fails, the treaty can go to hell and we will all start again."

=== Early 1922 ===
The first half of 1922 saw clashes between the IRA and USC along the new border, an IRA offensive inside Northern Ireland, sectarian violence and killings in Belfast and tensions between the two new governments.

On 14 January, Northern Ireland police arrested a number of the IRAs 5th Northern division in County Tyrone. They were traveling with members of the Monaghan Gaelic football team on their way to a match in Derry and had plans to free IRA prisoners from Derry Gaol. In response, on the night of 7–8 February, IRA units crossed into Northern Ireland and captured 40 Special Constables and prominent Loyalists in Fermanagh and Tyrone. They were to be held as hostages for the Monaghan IRA prisoners, several IRA volunteers were also captured during these raids. The Northern Ireland authorities responded by sealing-off many cross-border roads.

On 11 February, the IRA stopped a group of armed Special Constables at Clones railway station, County Monaghan. The USC unit was travelling by train from Belfast to Enniskillen (both in Northern Ireland), but the Irish Provisional Government was unaware British forces would be crossing through its territory. The IRA called on the Special Constables to surrender for questioning, but one of them shot dead IRA commandant Matt Fitzpatrick. This sparked a firefight in which four Special Constables were killed and several wounded. Five others were captured. The incident threatened to set off a major confrontation between North and South, and the British government temporarily suspended the withdrawal of British troops from the South. Northern Irelands Prime Minister Craig mobilized the USC to the border and planned to send 5,000 men across the border to rescue the Special Constable hostages. PM Churchill arranged for the release of the recently captured IRA men being held in Derry in return for the release of the Special Constables. A Border Commission was set up to mediate in any future cross-border disputes but achieved very little.

These incidents provoked retaliatory attacks by Loyalists against Catholics in Belfast, sparking further sectarian clashes. In the three days after the Clones incident, more than 30 people were killed in Belfast. On 14 February, Loyalists threw a bomb into a group of Catholic children playing on Weaver Street, Belfast. Four girls and two women died and 22 people suffered injuries "some of them horrific". During February 1922 there were three weeks of daily attacks and burning of homes in the nationalist communities of Belfast resulting in a death toll of 44 with 30 killed in one night. The death toll for March was worse with 60 people killed in Belfast alone. Thousands of refugees fled to Dublin and approximately 1,000 fled to Liverpool. What many nationalists referred to as pogroms reached its climax in May and June 1922 with heavy firing into nationalists communities leaving a total of 23,000 nationalists homeless.

On 18 March 1922, the military raided IRA headquarters in Belfast, seizing weapons and "the names of practically every Officer in the Division". The Irish Provisional Government condemned this as a breach of the truce. Over the next week, the IRA attacked several police barracks in the North including the one in Pomeroy, County Tyrone where approximately 18 service rifles, 20 service revolvers, bombs and ammunition were seized with no casualties on either side. On 28 March, a column of fifty IRA volunteers crossed into the North and seized the RIC barracks in Belcoo, County Fermanagh, after a three-hour battle. Fifteen RIC officers were captured, marched across the border into the South and held captive until 18 July.

=== McMahon family and Arnon Street killings ===
One of the most infamous sectarian attacks in Belfast during this period were the McMahon killings (24 March 1922), in which five Catholic family members and an employee were shot dead by gunmen who broke into their home. The reason for the attack remains disputed with one theory stating that Owen McMahons name was found on a list of donors to Sinn Féin that was seized by the RIC when they raided Sinn Féin headquarters six days prior to the attack. Another theory was that the gunmen were allegedly Special Constables, and it was apparently revenge for the IRA's killing of two policemen hours earlier. No one was ever charged and the case remains unsolved. A week later, six more Catholics were killed by Special Constables who went on a rampage in the Arnon Street killings (1 April 1922). This was also believed to have been revenge for the IRA's killing of a policeman.

=== IRA Northern Offensive and sectarian violence ===
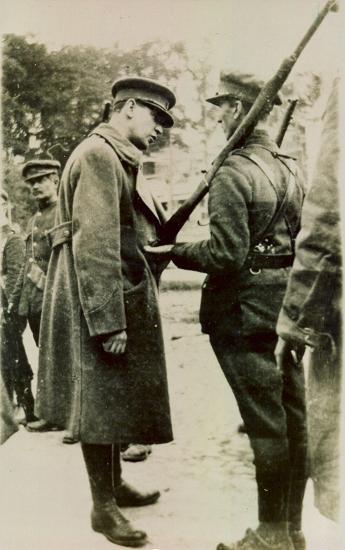
Michael Collins (left) inspects a National Army soldier in 1922

In spring 1922, Michael Collins, head of the Irish Provisional Government, was behind secret plans for an IRA offensive in Northern Ireland. He formed an "Ulster Council" within the IRA (Frank Aiken was named as Chairman of the Council), which included the commanders of its five northern divisions, to co-ordinate IRA activity in the north. Collins hoped the offensive would undermine the Northern Ireland government and unite the pro-treaty and anti-treaty IRA in a shared goal. The new Irish National Army secretly supplied weaponry and equipment for the offensive.

On 22 April 1922 IRA senior leader Seamus Woods held a meeting of northern IRA leadership where all agreed that all northern IRA units would strike at once. The offensive was to begin on 2 May 1922, but most of the IRA divisions had to postpone until later in the month. The 2nd Northern Division was unable to postpone and was allowed to begin operations on 2 May with attacks on police barracks in Bellaghy, Draperstown and Coalisland. During these attacks an RIC officer and an IRA volunteer were killed. The following day, three Specials were shot dead in Ballyronan, and another was killed in an ambush of a mobile patrol at Corvanaghan. These were followed by reprisal killings: on 6 May two Catholic men were shot dead at a house near Dungiven, and on 10 May, Specials shot three Catholic brothers in their home in Ballyronan, killing one.

The 3rd Northern Division was under the command of Seamus Woods. Woods and Roger McCorley were long time Officers in the IRAs Belfast Brigade and the 3rd Northern Division. On 5 April 1920 Woods led the IRA units that burned the Customs House and two tax offices in Belfast The northern offensive began operations on 18 May 1922 with the raiding of Musgrave Street RIC barracks in the centre of Belfast. The objective of the raid was to capture armoured cars and weaponry. A unit infiltrated the barracks but had to fight their way out when guards were alerted. One RIC constable was killed and another wounded during the attack on Musgrave barracks. Woods was quoted on this attack: "The whole Loyalist population is at a loss to know how such a raid could be attempted during curfew hours on the headquarters in Belfast and the largest barrack in Ireland. They are in a state of panic."

The IRA also carried out numerous firebomb attacks and dozens of fires blazed across Belfast. On 19 May 1922 a Unionist-owned mill was burned in Desertmartin, County Londonderry, later that day a mob of Loyalists and police attacked and burned many Catholic homes and businesses in the village. Uniformed Special Constables arrested four Catholic men at their homes outside the village, took two sets of brothers into a country lane and summarily executed all four men. No attempt was made to hide reprisal killings. On 19 May 1922 warnings were posted in Cookstown, County Tyrone: "Take notice that, if any more attacks are made on members of the RIC or Loyalists, reprisals at the rate of 10 to one will be made on prominent and known Sinn Feiners. God save the King." The IRA also attacked Martinstown RIC barracks in County Antrim with gunfire and grenades and ambushed a group of USC reinforcements, killing one.

The campaign saw further reprisals and sectarian violence in newly formed Northern Ireland. On 19 May 1922, 71 Catholic families were driven out of their homes in Belfast and on 31 May, another 78 Catholic families were driven out. Sectarian attacks were not limited to one side: on 19 May workmen at a cooperage in Little Patrick Street, Belfast were lined up and asked their religion. Four Protestant workers were separated from their Catholic workmates and shot dead.

On 22 May 1922, the IRA assassinated William J. Twaddell, a Unionist Member of Parliament in Belfast. This spurred the Northern Ireland government to introduce internment (imprisonment without trial). Over 500 men from Tyrone, Derry, Fermanagh, Armagh and Belfast were arrested (all of the internees were republicans). In a major blow to the IRA, a raid on a house in Belfast uncovered a list of IRA officers in the city, and documents proving the involvement of Southern IRA leaders. The USC were mobilized in large numbers to carry out patrols and raids, and a nighttime curfew was imposed across Northern Ireland.

This security crackdown, underpinned by the new Special Powers Act (7 April 1922), would cripple the IRA in Northern Ireland. Because of the harsh measures of the Special Powers Act many northern IRA men fled to the relative safety of County Donegal and reported for duty to the senior leader there - Charlie Daly (Daly and three of his Officers were executed by the Free State Army on 14 March 1923, becoming known as the Drumboe martyrs.) The Special Powers Act has been described as " the most draconian pieces of legislation ever passed in a liberal democracy." Joe Devlin, MP, stated the predicament the nationalist community was facing: "If Catholics have no revolvers they are murdered. If they have revolvers they are flogged and sentenced to death." (The act allowed for flogging in some cases.) The act was renewed several times before being made permanent in 1933 and stayed in effect until 1973 when it was replaced with the Northern Ireland (Emergency Provisions) Act 1973. The staggered start to the northern offensive also made it easier for the Northern authorities to tackle.

The RIC was disbanded and a new police force (the Royal Ulster Constabulary) was formed on 1 June 1922. The IRA was able to continue its offensive in early June 1922 there were increasing attacks on the USC in south County Armagh. In reprisal, on 13 June 1922, the Specials took two Catholic men from their homes in the area and killed them, dumping their bodies on the roadside at Lislea. On 17 June, IRA volunteers under Frank Aiken retaliated for the killings and for the sexual assault of a Catholic woman. A unit of fifty IRA volunteers ambushed a USC patrol at Drumintee, County Armagh killing two. Aiken later claimed that at least 60 Specials were killed by his 4th Northern Division in the period from Christmas to June 1922. Meanwhile, in one of the most notorious incidents of the period, on 17 June 1922 one of Aikens units carried out a retaliatory attack on nine Protestant homes at Altnaveigh, County Armagh shooting dead six Protestant civilians.

One of the best documented killings of this period occurred in the predominantly Catholic village of Cushendall, Country Antrim. On the night of 23 June 1922 (the day after the assassination of Sir Henry Wilson in London), a party of A-Specials, accompanied by British soldiers, arrived in the village to enforce the nightly curfew. The A-Specials opened fire on a crowd of onlookers and dragged three Catholic men: James McAllister, John Gore and John Hill into an alley and executed them. After the killings, the A-Specials claimed they were attacked by the IRA and returned fire, but a British government inquiry, which was declassified almost a century later, concluded that the constabulary's version of events was false.

=== Battle of Pettigo and Belleek ===
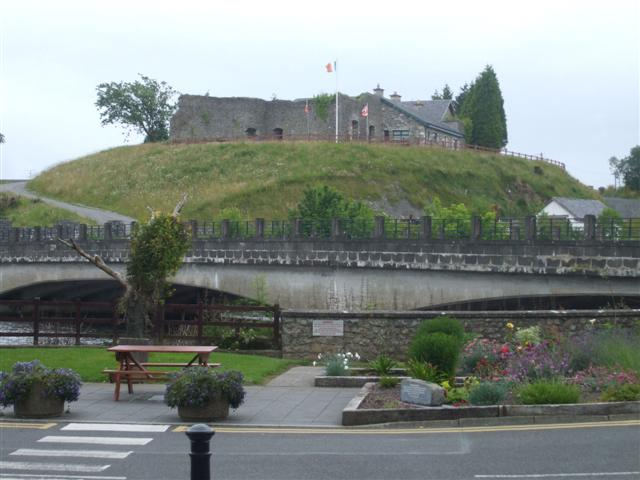
Belleek Fort in 2008

During the Northern Offensive, there were clashes between the IRA and British forces in an area known as the 'Belleek-Pettigo salient'. This was a triangular area of land in County Fermanagh, part of Northern Ireland but mostly cut-off from it by Lough Erne and the border. The villages of Belleek, County Fermanagh and Pettigo, County Donegal both straddle the border. The IRA garrisoned these villages and also occupied the triangular strip of Northern territory. On 27 May 1922 a USC group was sent into the area by boat and garrisoned Magherameena Castle, near Belleek. The IRA attacked the USC, forcing them to abandon their position and withdraw to a nearby island. The IRA also ambushed a convoy of USC reinforcements, killing the lead driver and forcing the Specials to retreat.

James Craig, Prime Minister of Northern Ireland, telegrammed Winston Churchill, Secretary of State for the Colonies, to request that British troops be sent to drive out the IRA. Over the next week, a large number of Specials and British troops attempted to capture Pettigo from a force of about 100 IRA volunteers, by both land and water. British forces bombarded the village and then stormed it and captured Pettigo on 4 June. Three IRA volunteers manning machine-gun posts were killed by British shelling and gunfire; most of the other IRA volunteers retreated. Belleek was captured by British troops on 8 June after a brief battle. They bombarded the old Belleek Fort, forcing its IRA garrison to retreat. Newspaper reports put the IRA casualties at seven killed and the total death toll as high as 30. Although in Southern territory, British troops continued to occupy Pettigo until January 1923, and Belleek Fort until August 1924.

The fighting heightened tensions between the Irish and British governments. It was the first clash between the IRA and British troops since the truce, and was the nearest the Northern IRA came to a pitched battle with the British Army. It was also the last major conflict between the IRA and British forces during this period.

== Aftermath ==
By the end of June 1922, the level of violence in Belfast had fallen and the IRA's Northern Offensive had petered out. There were several reasons for this. The Northern government's security crackdown and introduction of internment in late May soon crippled the IRA in Northern Ireland. Within four months, 446 Irish republicans/nationalists had been interned and by December 1924, 700 had been interned. A total of 263 men interned on the Prison Ship HMS Argenta, which was moored in Belfast Lough and described as a "floating gulag". The numerical superiority of the USC (19,400 members in the A and B Specials) also proved an insurmountable obstacle for the northern IRA. Irish nationalists in the South became distracted by the deepening split between pro-treaty and anti-treaty factions. In early June, the Irish Provisional Government adopted "a policy of peaceful obstruction" towards the Northern government, and Michael Collins suspended attempts to use force.

The outbreak of the Irish Civil War on 28 June 1922 diverted the IRA from its campaign against the Northern government. Many northern IRA men moved to the south to join the newly formed Free State Army. In June 1922 the Belfast IRA conducted an arson campaign, the governments reaction was swift and severe. The leader of the IRA in Belfast (Seamus Woods) stated just how hard operations had become: "The enemy are continually raiding and arresting; the heavy sentences and particularly the flogging making the civilians very loath to keep wanted men or arms". The killing of Michael Collins on 22 August dealt another blow to the northern IRA. Collins had secretly been arming and supporting the northern IRA, with his death many northern IRA men felt their cause was unwinnable. IRA Belfast Brigade leader Roger McCorley stated, "When Collins was killed the northern element (of the IRA) gave up all hope". Nationalist hopes for a large transfer of Northern territory to the newly-formed Irish Free State (via the Irish Boundary Commission) may have also led to a decrease in violence.

By the end of 1922 Northern Ireland was relatively peaceful, which continued through 1924 when internment was ended and the Belfast curfew lifted.

=== Statistics ===
Between 1920–1922, within Northern Ireland, 557 people were killed: 303 Catholics, 172 Protestants and 82 police and British Army personnel. A number of IRA volunteers were also killed. Belfast suffered the most casualties, as 455 people there were killed: 267 Catholics, 151 Protestants and 37 members of the security forces. The city had a higher per-capita death rate than any other part of Ireland during the Irish revolutionary period, with 40% of all conflict-related deaths.

Almost 1,000 homes and businesses in Belfast were destroyed, about 80% of them Catholic and 20% Protestant. More than 10,000 people became refugees, most of them Catholics who generally fled to other parts of Ireland. Hundreds of refugees were transported to Dublin on special trains where many were housed in buildings closely associated with Unionism in Ireland. The Kildare Street Club and the Masonic Order Grand Lodge of Ireland in Molesworth Street, Dublin were commandeered by the IRA. About 8,000 Catholics and 2,000 Protestants were forced to move within Belfast alone. An estimated 8,000–10,000 workers, mostly Catholics, were expelled from their jobs.

Catholic relief organizations estimated that 8,700 to 11,000 Catholics had lost their jobs, that up to 23,000 Catholics had been forced from their homes and about 500 Catholic-owned businesses had been destroyed between July 1920 and July 1922.

Outside of Belfast, at least 104 people were killed: 61 civilians (45 Catholics and 15 Protestants) and 45 policemen/soldiers.

While both communities suffered sectarian and politically-motivated violence during this time, Catholics were disproportionately affected. Catholics made up less than one-quarter of Belfast's population but almost two-thirds of the victims.

=== Defining pogrom ===
At the time, many Irish Catholics in Belfast felt that the Loyalist violence, and the violent expulsion of thousands of Catholics from mixed neighborhoods and workplaces, was akin to a pogrom or ethnic cleansing being waged against them. The American Commission on Conditions in Ireland's Interim Report 1921 stated "These riots between Protestants and Catholics in which Protestants were the aggressors partook of the character of Russian pogroms against the Jews". In one author's opinion, "The Catholic population had been beaten into submission". Nationalist newspapers likewise decried the violence as a pogrom.

Characterizing the violence as "pogroms" and "ethnic cleansing" has been fiercely debated by historians. Historians have argued that although the term "pogrom" could be used to describe the large-scale assaults on Catholics (June 1920), but the resultant counterattacks produced a situation similar to a civil war. In the context of the Belfast shipyard clearances, the use of the word "pogrom" does not strictly conform to dictionary definitions, which typically refers to pogroms against Jews in eastern Europe. Intimidation and retaliation attacks were carried out by both communities, with about third of those killed and over 20% of refugees being Protestant.

=== Later "Troubles" ===
There would be no major outbreaks of violence again until May 1935 when there were arson attacks on Catholic homes in Upper Library Street, Belfast. On 10 May 1935, a curfew was imposed on the area. At that time the Minister of Home Affairs (Northern Ireland) Dawson Bates banned all public meetings and demonstrations (the ban was lifted on 27 June). In June 1935 a crowd attacked the small Catholic enclave off Great Georges Street, Belfast. In what became known as the Lancaster street riots, the IRA were based out of Lancaster street and provided a defence for the area under the command of Jimmy Steele (Irish republican). Attacks continued through the summer on Catholic homes in the areas of Lancaster and York Streets. By the end of the 1935 attacks and riots, thirteen people had been killed, hundreds had been wounded, mass expulsions of Catholics from shipyard jobs occurred again. The Catholic Relief Committee stated that mobs had evicted 431 families from their homes and dozens of houses were burned in the central part of Belfast. Over 2500 people had been driven from their homes with 85 percent being Catholic and 73 homes destroyed by arson. Many Catholics referred to these incidents as pogroms against them.

In The Troubles that began in 1969, some Belfast Catholics whose homes had been attacked when they were children found themselves being attacked again in what seemed a re-run of the troubles of 1920-1922. The Belfast shipyards had a long-standing reputation as Protestant "closed shops" – in 1970, 500 Catholic workers were expelled from their jobs.
