= McMahon killings =

1922 murder of a family in Belfast

- Part of the Irish War of Independence and The Troubles in Ulster (1920–1922)
- McMahon killings (Greater Belfast)
- Location: 54°36′40″N 05°56′16″W; Kinnaird Terrace, Belfast, Northern Ireland
- Date: 24 March 1922; 01:20 (GMT)
- Target: Catholic civilians
- Attack type: Mass shooting
- Weapon: Revolvers
- Deaths: 6
- Injuries: 2
- Perpetrator: Ulster Special Constabulary (alleged)

The McMahon killings or the McMahon murders occurred on 24 March 1922 when six Catholic civilians were shot dead at the home of the McMahon family in Belfast, Northern Ireland. A group of police officers broke into their house at night and shot all eight males inside, in an apparent sectarian attack. The victims were businessman Owen McMahon, four of his sons, and one of his employees. Two others were shot but survived, and a female family member was assaulted. The survivors said most of the gunmen wore police uniforms and it is suspected they were members of the Ulster Special Constabulary (USC). It is believed to have been a reprisal for the Irish Republican Army's (IRA) killing of two policemen on May Street, Belfast the day before.

Northern Ireland had been created ten months before, in the midst of the Irish War of Independence. A truce ended the war in most of Ireland; but sectarian conflict in Belfast, and fighting in border areas, continued. Northern Ireland's police – especially the USC, which was almost wholly Protestant and unionist – were implicated in a number of attacks on Catholic and Irish nationalist civilians as reprisal for IRA actions. A week later, six more Catholics were killed in another reprisal attack.

== Background ==
In May 1921, during the Irish War of Independence, Ireland was partitioned under British law, creating Northern Ireland. In July 1921, a truce was agreed between representatives of the Irish Republic and the British Government, ending the war in most of Ireland. Under the Anglo-Irish Treaty of December 1921, most of Ireland would become the Irish Free State, while Northern Ireland could choose to remain part of the United Kingdom, with the final border being decided by a boundary commission. Violence continued in Northern Ireland after the truce. In the first half of 1922, in the words of historian Robert Lynch, the Irish Republican Army (IRA), "would make one final attempt to undermine the ever hardening reality of partition by launching an all out offensive on the recently established province of Northern Ireland".

To counter the IRA, the new unionist Government of Northern Ireland established the Ulster Special Constabulary (USC), a quasi-military reserve police force to the Royal Irish Constabulary (RIC). The USC had a mutually hostile relationship with Irish nationalists and republicans in Northern Ireland. Lynch writes of the USC: "some were polite and courteous, others merely arrogant and destructive whilst a small anonymous minority set out to kill".

The McMahon killings are believed to have been a reprisal for the IRA's killing of two USC men in Belfast. On 23 March 1922, constables Thomas Cunningham and William Cairnside were patrolling Great Victoria Street in the city centre when they were approached by a group of IRA members and shot dead. Two Catholics, Peter Murphy (61) and Sarah McShane (15), were shot dead in a suspected reprisal attack several hours later in the Catholic Short Strand area by unidentified gunmen.

The McMahon family had no links to any paramilitary violence. Owen McMahon was a supporter and personal friend of Joe Devlin, the Irish Parliamentary Party (IPP) Member of Parliament (MP), an Irish nationalist who rejected republican violence. McMahon was a prosperous businessman, who owned several pubs in Belfast (one of which was The Capstan Bar on Ann Street) and had at one time been chairman of the Northern Vintners' Association. His home at Kinnaird Terrace, off the Antrim Road in north-central Belfast, near the New Lodge area, was described as a "sprawling Victorian mansion". However, one of the men killed at Kinnaird Terrace, Edward McKinney, an employee of the McMahon family, was subsequently and posthumously acknowledged to have been an IRA volunteer by IRA GHQ (General Headquarters). In his book, Donegal and The Civil War, Liam Ó Duibhir wrote that "His [McKinney's IRA] ... membership was concealed after the killings as it would have given the police and the loyalist mob an opportunity to justify their actions."

== Killings ==
At about 1:00 am on 24 March 1922, two men wearing police uniforms seized a sledgehammer from a Belfast Corporation workman, who was guarding a building site at Carlisle Circus. The sledgehammer was later used to smash open the McMahon door. A curfew was in place at the time, due to the daily violence in the city. At nearby Clifton Avenue they met three other men and the party of five proceeded to the home of Owen McMahon. Eight males and three women were in the house that night. The males were Owen, his six sons, and Edward McKinney. McKinney was from Desertegney, a parish just north of Buncrana in Inishowen, County Donegal. He worked for the McMahons as a barman. The women were Owen's wife Eliza, her daughter and her niece. At about 1:20 am, the gang used the sledgehammer to break down the door of the McMahon household.

Owen's wife, Eliza, said that four of the men wore police caps and carried revolvers while another wore civilian clothes. John McMahon, one of Owen's sons, said "Four of the five men were dressed in the uniform of the RIC but, from their appearance, I know they are Specials, not regular RIC". The Nationalist newspaper The Irish News also conducted an enquiry and came to a similar conclusion on the identity of the killers: "it was generally accepted that the members were, of the part-time wholly Protestant, 'B' Class of the Special Constabulary".

All of the men had hidden their faces. The four men in police uniform rushed up the stairs and herded the males into the dining room. The women were taken into another room. Eliza "got down on her knees and pleaded for mercy, but was struck on the side of the head and fell to the floor". When Owen asked why his family was being singled-out, one of the gunmen said it was because he was "a respected papist". The gunmen said "you boys say your prayers", before opening fire. Five of the men were killed outright and two were wounded, one fatally.

Owen McMahon (50), Gerard McMahon (15), Frank McMahon (24), Patrick McMahon (22) and Edward McKinney (25) were killed outright while Bernard McMahon (26) died later. The youngest McMahon son, 12-year-old Michael, survived the attack by hiding behind furniture and pretending to be hit. John McMahon (30) survived despite serious gunshot wounds. Eliza McMahon raised the alarm by opening the drawing room window and shouting "Murder! Murder!" A matron at an adjoining nursing home was alerted and phoned the police and an ambulance. It has been alleged that a group of policemen operating out of Brown Square Barracks in the Shankill Road area were behind the killings. This has never been proved, but historian Éamon Phoenix, of Stranmillis College in Belfast, has said there is "strong circumstantial evidence" that District Inspector John Nixon was responsible. Historian Tim Pat Coogan also believes the police were responsible. An inquiry was carried out by the Department of Defence of the Irish Free State, but not by the Northern Ireland authorities. A 1924 Free State report alleged that twelve policemen, whom the report identified by name, had carried out the McMahon murders, as well as several other attacks on Catholics.

== Aftermath ==
The killings caused outrage among Belfast's Catholic population and over 10,000 people attended the funerals of those killed. The funerals of Owen, Gerard, Frank and Patrick were held on Sunday, 26 March. The British Army lined the route of the funeral procession – from north Belfast to Milltown Cemetery – anticipating it would be attacked. Edward McKinney was buried on the same day, Sunday, 26 March, in Cockhill Cemetery just outside Buncrana in his native Inishowen.

At the funeral Mass for the victims at St Patrick's Church, Rev Father Bernard Laverty told the congregation that even the Black and Tans "had not been guilty of anything approaching this [crime] in its unspeakable barbarity". The McMahons had been "done to death merely because they were Catholics", but he told the mourners to practise "patience and forbearance" and not to seek revenge. Irish Nationalist Party MP Joe Devlin told the British Parliament, "If Catholics have no revolvers to protect themselves they are murdered. If they have revolvers they are flogged and sentenced to death".

David Lloyd George and Winston Churchill, worried that the violence would collapse the new Northern Ireland administration, organised a meeting in London between Irish republican leader Michael Collins and Sir James Craig, Prime Minister of Northern Ireland, both to try to stop the IRA violence which Collins had been tacitly encouraging and supporting, and to pressure Craig to provide more protection for Catholics. Craig denied the nationalist assertion that the McMahon killings were part of an anti-Catholic pogrom on behalf of state forces, telling the Parliament of Northern Ireland that, "no such thing has ever been the policy of Protestants here ... The Ulster men are up against, not Catholics but ... up against rebels, that they are up against murder, Bolshevism and up against those enemies not only of Ulster but of the [British] Empire".

The killings were part of a series of reprisals on Catholics for IRA attacks in Belfast and elsewhere. The following week saw a similar incident in Belfast known as the "Arnon Street killings", in which six Catholics were killed by uniformed police who broke into their homes; allegedly in revenge for the killing of a policeman. Six weeks later in Ballyronan the McKeown family was attacked in a similar fashion to the McMahon family, three brothers were shot and one of them were killed. In total, 452 people would be killed in Belfast in the conflict between June 1920 and July 1922 – 267 Catholics and 185 Protestants.

No one was ever prosecuted for the killings but District Inspector John Nixon of the Royal Irish Constabulary (RIC) was accused of involvement by historians Tim Pat Coogan and Éamon Phoenix. Nixon was later forced to step down from the Royal Ulster Constabulary (the force that succeeded the RIC in June 1922), albeit on full pension, in 1924 after being heard giving (in breach of police regulations) a political speech to an Orange Order meeting saying that, "not an inch of Ulster should be yielded" to the Free State.

In 2024, in his book Ghosts of a Family detailing the McMahon killings and the general sectarian strife of the early 1920s, historian Edward Burke named loyalist David Duncan as his prime suspect.

== See also ==
- Timeline of the Irish War of Independence
