= Arnon Street killings =

Killing of Catholics in Belfast

- Part of the Irish War of Independence and The Troubles in Ulster (1920–1922)
- Location: Belfast, Northern Ireland
- Date: 1 April 1922
- Target: Catholic civilians
- Attack type: Mass shooting
- Deaths: 6
- Injuries: 1
- Perpetrator: Unknown

The Arnon Street killings, also referred to as the Arnon Street murders or the Arnon Street massacre, took place on 1 April 1922 in Belfast, Northern Ireland. Six Catholic civilian men and boys, three in Arnon Street, were shot or beaten to death by men who broke into their homes. It is believed that policemen carried out the attack, members of either the Ulster Special Constabulary (USC) or Royal Irish Constabulary (RIC), in retaliation for the killing of an RIC officer by the Irish Republican Army (IRA).

== Background ==
Although the Irish War of Independence officially ended in July 1921, the Irish Republican Army's conflict with British and Irish unionist forces continued in Northern Ireland and escalated in the first half of 1922. The Ulster IRA, with the tacit but covert assistance of Michael Collins (head of the new Irish Free State) continued to wage a guerrilla war in Northern Ireland. According to historian Alan Parkinson, despite "the IRA having some short term successes ... the main effect of this intensive campaign was to unleash a terrible backlash on the Catholic population in Belfast". Only a week before the Arnon Street incident, policemen – either Royal Irish Constabulary (RIC) or Ulster Special Constabulary (USC) – had killed six Catholic civilians (the McMahon killings).

On the evening of 1 April an RIC constable, named George Turner was patrolling the Old Lodge Road when he was killed by a sniper. The IRA denied any involvement in the killing of Constable Turner.

== The killings ==
About ten police officers in Brown Square Barracks, upon hearing of Turner's murder, took a Lancia armoured car and went touring Catholic areas. When they dismounted their vehicle, witnesses heard them shouting "Cut the guts out of them for the murder of Turner". Their first victim was John McRory (40) who lived on Stanhope Street, just across the road from where Constable Turner had been shot. The police broke into his house and shot him dead in his kitchen. In Park Street, Bernard McKenna (42), father of seven, was killed while lying in bed. Finally, the police arrived at Arnon Street.

William Spallen (70) lived at 16 Arnon Street and had just returned from the funeral of his wife. His 12-year-old grandson, Gerald Tumelty, witnessed his death: "Two men came into the room, one was in the uniform of a policeman. They asked my grandfather his name and he said William Spallen. The man in plain clothes fired three shots at him. When I cried out he said "lie down or I will put a bullet into you". Tumelty said the killers then took £20 that his grandfather had to pay for his wife's funeral.

The attackers then used a sledgehammer to break into the house next door, where they found Joseph Walsh (39) in bed with his seven-year-old son Michael and his two-year-old daughter Bridget. Joseph Walsh was bludgeoned to death with the sledgehammer while Michael Walsh was shot and died from his wounds the next day. Bridget was also injured in the attack, hit by a bullet that had passed through Joseph Walsh. Another son, Frank (14), was shot in the thigh but survived. As the killers exited the property, they witnessed Catherine Austin holding James Walsh's youngest child, 8-month-old Robert James, who was being looked after by Catherine Austin whilst his mother attended Mass. The infant was shot through the head, which passed through and hit Catherine Austin in the arm. After the shooting, Robert James' mother was forced to, "scoop up the remains left behind and put it in a bowl," so severe was the damaged caused by the bullet according to her granddaughter. A local man, George Murray, described the aftermath of the attack: "One of the three policemen had revolvers and the other two had guns. These men went out. Immediately after, seven armed men – five in police uniform and two in civilians clothes – entered". Later that evening, another Catholic, John Mallon (60), was shot dead in Skegoneill Avenue.

== Aftermath ==
The Dublin-based Irish Independent wrote that "never even in the worst state of terror in the west and south has the state of affairs which now prevails in the Northern capital been experienced". Michael Collins sent an angry telegram to Northern Ireland Prime Minister James Craig, demanding a joint inquiry into the killings in accordance with Clause 5 of the recently signed Craig-Collins Pact. No such joint inquiry took place.

As with the McMahon killings one week earlier, it was strongly suspected that an RIC Detective Inspector, John William Nixon, operating out of the Brown Street Police barracks, had organised the attack. Nixon and several other policemen failed to turn up at roll call at the barracks immediately after the killings. According to Irish historical writer Tim Pat Coogan, "in the atmosphere of the time neither Craig nor the British could or would prosecute or investigate such men without risk of a serious backlash amongst the Specials Special Constabulary". Bishop (later Cardinal) MacRory had no doubts that a cover-up was staged in the case of the Arnon killings and stated: "I believe not a single man will be arrested".

According to Parkinson, "the raw sectarianism of many violent acts during this period were not confined to large scale incidents such as the Arnon Street or the McMahon murders, nor indeed to any one political or religious group". For instance, the day before the Arnon Street killings, it is believed that Catholics were responsible for throwing a grenade through the window of the house of Protestant Francis Donnelly, killing his two-year-old son Frank and mortally wounding another son, Joseph (12).

According to historian Robert Lynch's count, a total of 464 people died in Belfast between 1920 and 1922. A further 1,091 were wounded. Of the dead, 159 were Protestant civilians, 258 Catholic were civilians, 35 were British forces, and 12 were IRA volunteers.
