= Ulster Special Constabulary =

Specialized police force of Northern Ireland

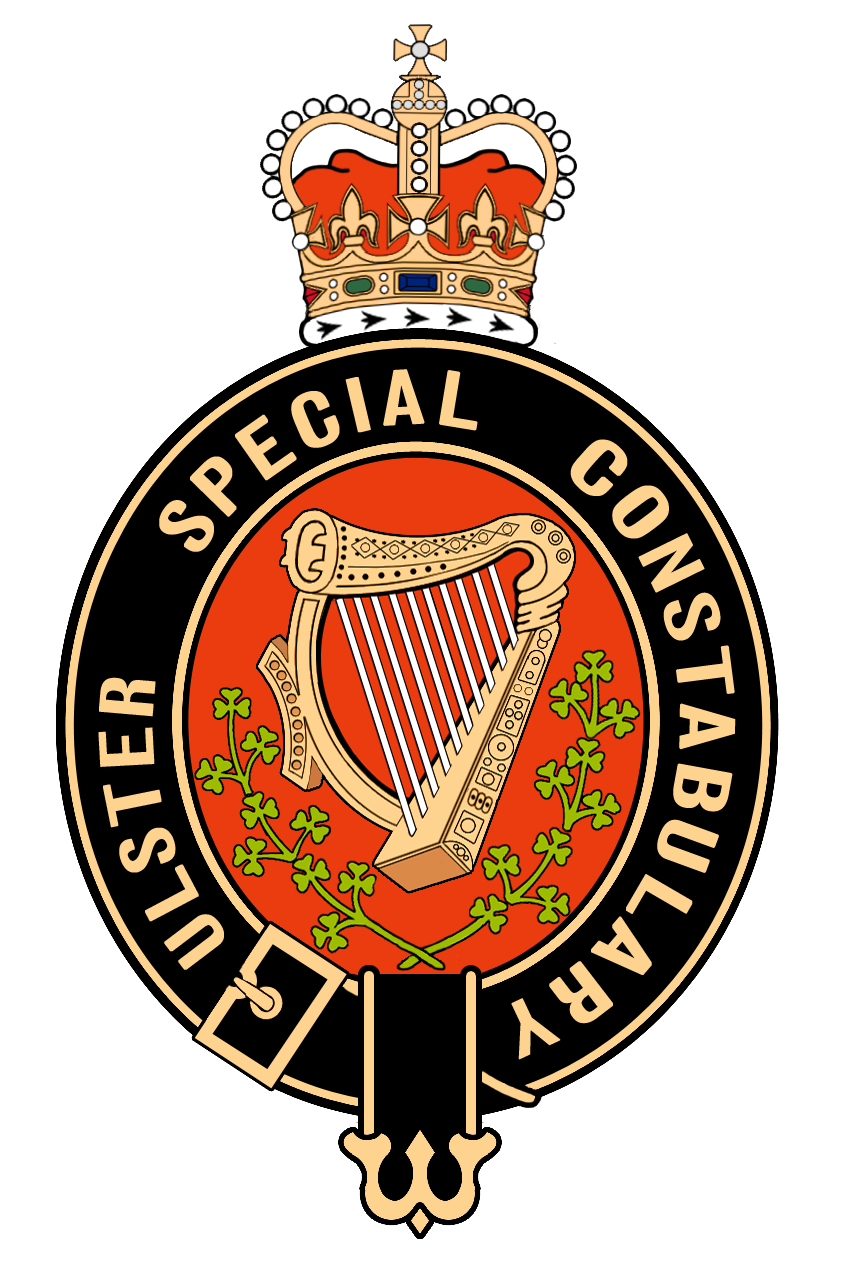
- Common name: B Specials
- Abbreviation: USC

Agency overview
- Formed: October 1920
- Dissolved: 31 March 1970
- Superseding agency: UDR
- Employees: 5,500
- Volunteers: 26,500

Jurisdictional structure
- National agency: Northern Ireland
- Operations jurisdiction: Northern Ireland
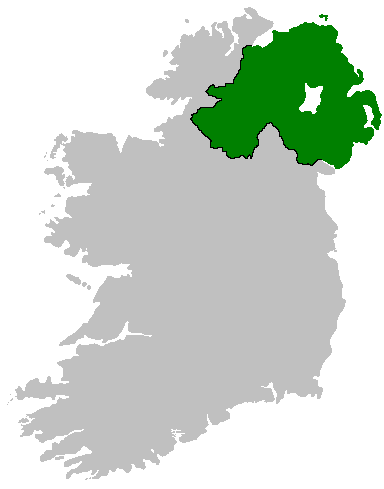
- Map of Ulster Special Constabulary's jurisdiction
- Area: 13,843 km^{2} (5,345 sq mi)
- General nature: Local civilian police

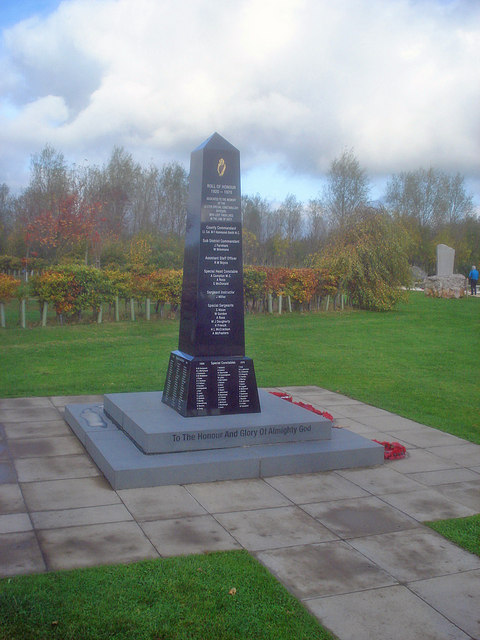
Ulster Special Constabulary memorial

The Ulster Special Constabulary (USC; commonly called the "B-Specials" or "B Men") was a quasi-military reserve special constable police force in what would later become Northern Ireland. It was set up in October 1920, shortly before the partition of Ireland. The USC was an armed corps, organised partially on military lines and called out in times of emergency, such as war or insurgency. It performed this role most notably in the early 1920s during the Irish War of Independence and the 1956–1962 IRA Border Campaign.

During its existence, 95 USC members were killed in the line of duty. Most of these (72) were killed in conflict with the IRA in 1921 and 1922. Another 8 died during the Second World War, in air raids or IRA attacks. Of the remainder, most died in accidents but two former officers were killed during the Troubles in the 1980s.

The force was almost exclusively Ulster Protestant and as a result was viewed with great mistrust by Catholics. It carried out several revenge killings and reprisals against Catholic civilians in the 1920–22 conflict. Unionists generally supported the USC as contributing to the defence of Northern Ireland from subversion and outside aggression.

The Special Constabulary was disbanded in May 1970, after the Hunt Report, which advised re-shaping Northern Ireland's security forces to attract more Catholic recruits and demilitarising the police. Its functions and membership were largely taken over by the Ulster Defence Regiment and the Royal Ulster Constabulary.

== Formation ==
The Ulster Special Constabulary was formed against the background of conflict over Irish independence and the partition of Ireland.

The 1919–21 Irish War of Independence, saw the Irish Republican Army (IRA) launch a guerrilla campaign in pursuit of Irish independence. Unionists in Ireland's northeast were vehemently against this campaign and against Irish independence. However, once it became apparent that the British government was committed to implementing Dominion Status for all of Ireland outside Ulster in response to Sinn Féin's demands, which were far more radical than those of the defunct Irish Parliamentary Party, Unionists in most of the province of Ulster directed their energies into the partition of Ireland by the creation of Northern Ireland as an autonomous region in the United Kingdom. The new region would consist of two thirds of Ulster, the six counties that Unionists could control. The other three counties (Donegal, Monaghan, and Cavan) had disproportionately Catholic and nationalist majorities and would become part of the Irish Free State. Partition was enacted by the British Parliament in the Government of Ireland Act 1920.

Two main factors were behind the formation of the Ulster Special Constabulary. One was the desire of Unionists, led by Sir James Craig (then a junior minister in the British Government, and later the Prime Minister of Northern Ireland), that the apparatus of government and security should be placed in their hands long before Northern Ireland was formally established.

A second reason was that violence in the north was increasing after the summer of 1920. The IRA began extending attacks to the Royal Irish Constabulary (RIC), RIC barracks, and revenue offices in Northern Ireland. There had been serious rioting between Catholics and Protestants in Derry in May and June and in Belfast in July, which had left up to 40 people dead.

With police and troops being drawn towards combating insurgency in the south and west, Unionists wanted a force that would be dedicated to taking on the IRA. At a 2 September 1920 meeting of government Ministers in London Craig said that the loyal population was losing faith in the government's ability to protect them and that loyalist paramilitary groups threatened, in the words of Craig, "a recourse to arms, which would precipitate civil war". Craig proposed to the British cabinet a new "volunteer constabulary" which "must be raised from the loyal population" and organised, "on military lines" and "armed for duty within the six county area only". On 23 July 1920 Craig informed the British cabinet that the "Specials" would "prevent mob law and the Protestants from running amok." He recommended that "the organisation of the Ulster Volunteers (UVF), (the unionist militia formed in 1912) should be used for this purpose". Wilfrid Spender, the former UVF quartermaster in 1913–14, and by now a decorated war veteran, was appointed by Craig to form and run the USC. UVF units were "incorporated en masse" into the new USC.

The idea of a volunteer police force in the north appealed to British Prime Minister David Lloyd George for several practical reasons; it freed up the RIC and military for use elsewhere in Ireland, it was cheap, and it did not need new legislation. Special Constabulary Acts had been enacted in 1832 and 1914, meaning that the administration in Dublin Castle only had to use existing laws to create it. The formation of the Ulster Special Constabulary was therefore announced on 22 October 1920.

On 1 November 1920, the scheme was officially announced by the British government.

== Composition ==
The composition of the USC was overwhelmingly Protestant and Unionist, for a number of reasons. Several informal "constabulary" groups had already been created, for example, in Belfast, Fermanagh and Antrim. The Ulster Unionist Labour Association had established an "unofficial special constabulary," with members drawn chiefly from the shipyards, tasked with 'policing' Protestant areas.

In April 1920, Captain Sir Basil Brooke (future Prime Minister of Northern Ireland), had set up "Fermanagh Vigilance", a vigilante group to provide defence against incursions by the IRA. Brooke himself had been personally affected by the organisation, as his son had been a victim of kidnapping. In Ballymacarrett, a Protestant rector named John Redmond had helped form a unit of ex-servicemen to keep the peace after the July riots.

There was a willingness to arm or recognise existing Protestant militias. Wilfrid Spender, head of the Ulster Volunteer Force, encouraged his members to join. For these groups, was an immediate and illicit supply of arms available, especially from the Ulster Volunteers. Charles Wickham, Chief of Police for the north of Ireland, favoured incorporation of the Ulster Volunteers into "regular military units" instead of having to "face them down". A number of these groups were absorbed into the new Ulster Special Constabulary.

Nationalists pointed out that the composition of the USC was overwhelmingly Protestant and loyal, claiming the government was arming Protestants to attack Catholics. In addition, a number of Special Constables, newly appointed by the Lisburn Urban Council, had been charged with rioting and looting committed over three days and nights following the assassination of RIC Inspector Oswald Swanzy. During that same time period, members of the Dromore UVF were said to have supervised the expulsion of Catholic families from Dromore. A further detail was that many UVF units joined the new Constabulary, with their commanders being appointed to senior positions.

Unsuccessful efforts were made to attract more Catholics into the force, but these largely failed. One reason for this was that Catholic members were more easily targeted by the IRA for intimidation and assassination. The government suggested that, with enough Catholic recruits, special constabulary patrols made up of Catholics only could be extended into Catholic areas. However, the Nationalist Party and Ancient Order of Hibernians discouraged their members from joining.

The IRA issued a statement which said that any Catholics who joined the Specials would be treated as traitors and would be dealt with accordingly.

== Organisation ==
The USC was initially financed and equipped by the British government and placed under the control of the RIC. The USC consisted of 32,000 men divided into four sections, all of whom were armed:

- A Specials – full-time and paid, worked alongside regular RIC men, but could not be posted outside their home areas (regular RIC officers could be posted anywhere in the country); usually served at static checkpoints (originally 5,500 members)
- B Specials – part-time, usually on duty for one evening per week and serving under their own command structure, and unpaid, although they had a generous system of allowances (which were reduced following the reorganisation of the USC a few years later), served wherever the RIC served and manned Mobile Groups of platoon size; (originally 19,000 members)
- C Specials – unpaid, non-uniformed reservists, usually rather elderly and used for static guard duties near their homes (originally 7,500 members)
  - C1 Specials – non-active C class specials who could be called out in emergencies. The C1 category was formed in late 1921, incorporating the various local unionist militias such as the Ulster Volunteers into a new special class of the USC, thus placing them under the control and discipline of the Stormont Government.

The units were organised on military lines up to company level. Platoons had two officers, a Head Constable, four sergeants and sixty special constables. The Belfast units were constructed differently from those in the counties. The districts were based on the existing RIC divisions. The constables drew pistols and truncheons before going on patrol and considerable efforts were made to use them only in Protestant areas. This did free up regular policemen who were generally more acceptable to most Ulster Catholics.

By July 1921, more than 3,500 'A' Specials had been enrolled, and almost 16,000 'B' Specials. By 1922 recruiting had swelled the numbers to: 5,500 A Specials, 19,000 B Specials and 7,500 C1 Specials. Their duties would include combatting the urban guerrilla operations of the IRA, and the suppression of the local IRA in rural areas. In addition they were to prevent border incursion, smuggling of arms and escape of fugitives.

=== Opposition ===
From the outset, the formation of the USC came in for widespread criticism, mostly from Irish nationalists and the Dublin government but also from some elements of the British military and administrative establishment in Ireland and in the British press, which saw the USC as a potentially divisive and sectarian force. In the British House of Commons, the leader of the Nationalist Party of Northern Ireland, Joseph Devlin, formerly a leading member of the now defunct Irish Parliamentary Party, made his feelings on the creation of the USC clear: "The Chief Secretary is going to arm pogromists to murder Catholics...we would not touch your special constabulary with a 40 foot pole. Their pogrom is to be made less difficult. Instead of paving stones and sticks they are to be given rifles."

Sir Nevil Macready, general officer commanding-in-chief of the British Army in Ireland, along with his supporters in the Irish administration, refused to approve the new force but were overridden; Lloyd George approved of it from the beginning. Macready and Henry Hughes Wilson argued that the concept of a special constabulary was a dangerous one. (Note: Wilson wrote, "To arm those "Black men" in the north without putting them under discipline is to invite trouble.")

Wilson warned the formation of a partisan constabulary "would mean; taking sides, civil war and savage reprisals." John Anderson, the Under Secretary for Ireland (head of the British Administration in Dublin) shared his fears, "you cannot, in the middle of a faction fight, recognise one of the contending parties and expect it to deal with disorder in the spirit of impartiality and fairness essential in those who have to carry out the order of the Government." On 18 March 1922 Lionel Curtis (who had been a secretary to the British delegation at the Treaty negotiations) sent a memo to the British Cabinet urging them to reduce the size of the USC: "The British Government has armed and is paying for that force but, without question, the government of Northern Ireland controls it...they have assumed the military functions specifically reserved to the British Government simply by calling their forces police." The Deputy Controller of Finance at the British Treasury (Otto Niemeyer) stated that the military was concerned that the USC posed a threat to peace: "The military authorities and indeed all but the extreme Orange regard these Specials not only as unnecessary but as very dangerous to peace."

The Irish nationalist press was less reserved. The Fermanagh Herald noted the opposition of Irish nationalists:

These "Special Constables" will be nothing more and nothing less than the dregs of the Orange lodges, armed and equipped to overawe Nationalists and Catholics, and with a special object and special facilities and special inclination to invent 'crimes' against Nationalists and Catholics... they are the very classes whom an upright Government would try to keep powerless...

Vice Admiral Sir Arthur Hezlet in the official History of the Ulster Special Constabulary, contended that "Sinn Fein regarded the Specials as an excuse for arming the Orangemen and an act even more atrocious than the creation of the 'Black and Tans'! Their fury was natural as they saw that the Specials might well mean that they would be unable to intimidate and subdue the North by Force. Their skilful propaganda set about blackening the image of Special Constables, trying to identify them with the worst elements of the Protestant mobs in Belfast. They sought to magnify and distort every incident and to stir up hatred of the force even before it started to function."

== Training, uniform, weaponry and equipment ==
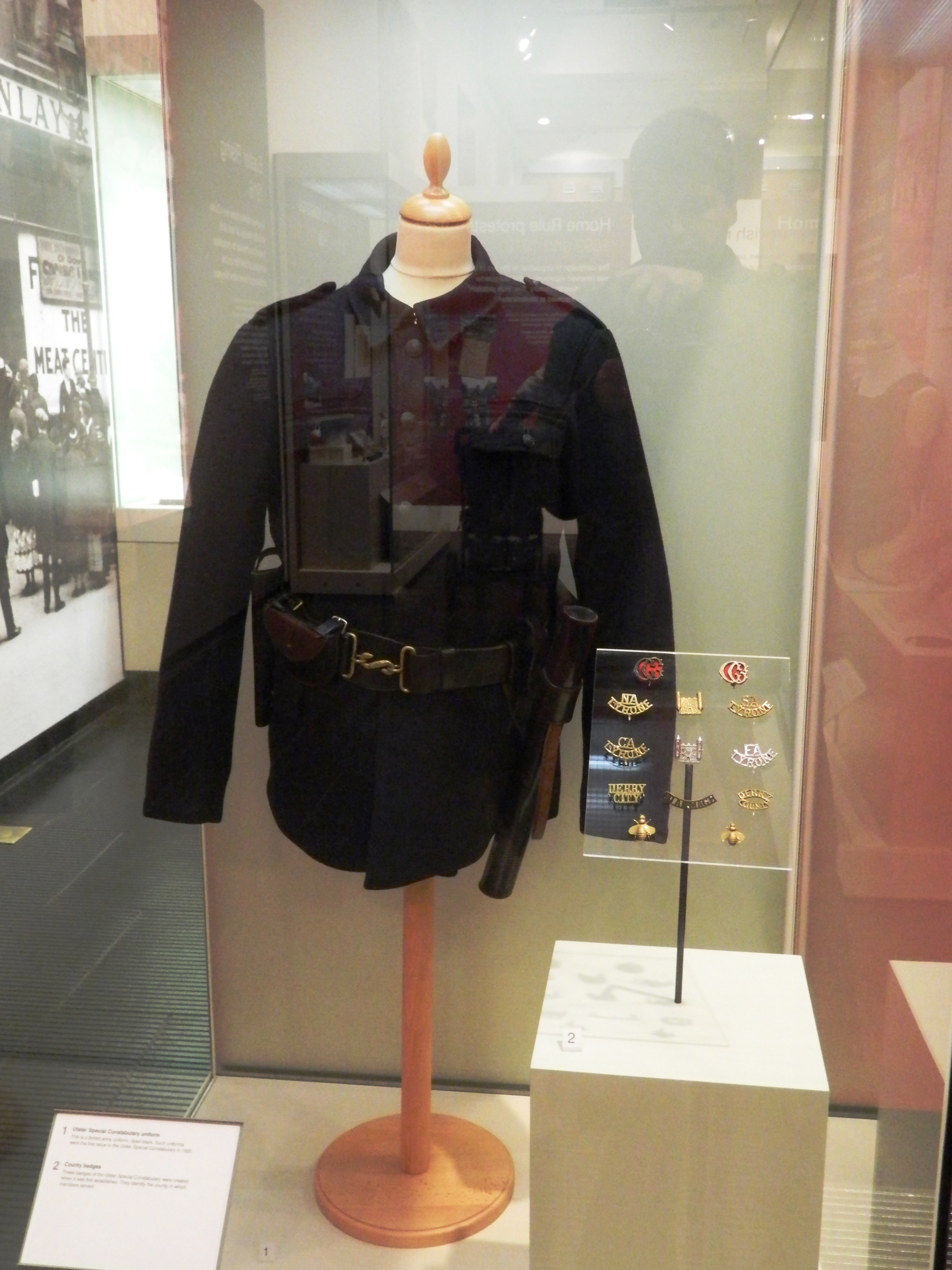
1920 Special Constabulary uniform, in the Ulster Museum

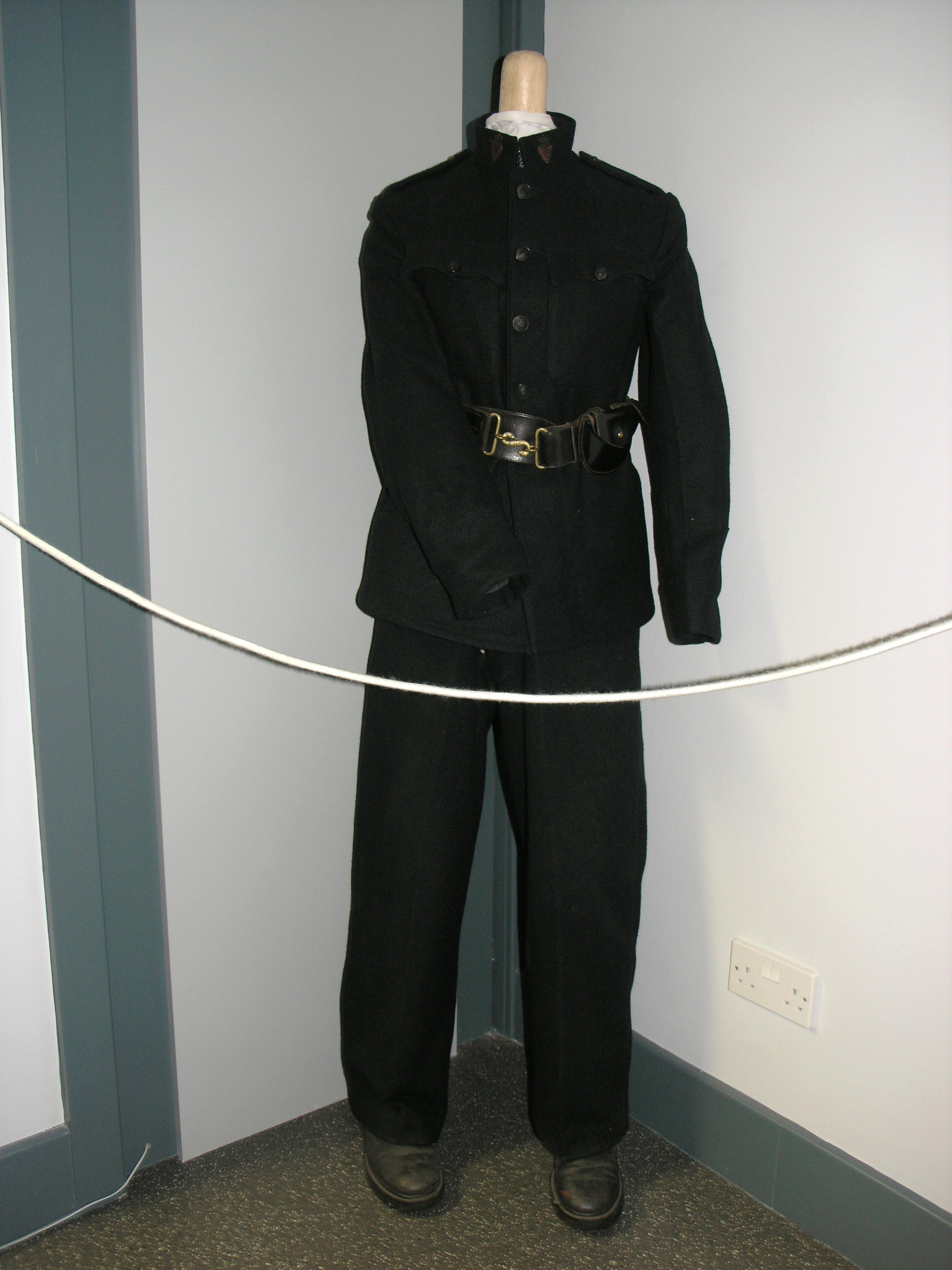
B-Specials uniform, in the Free Derry Museum

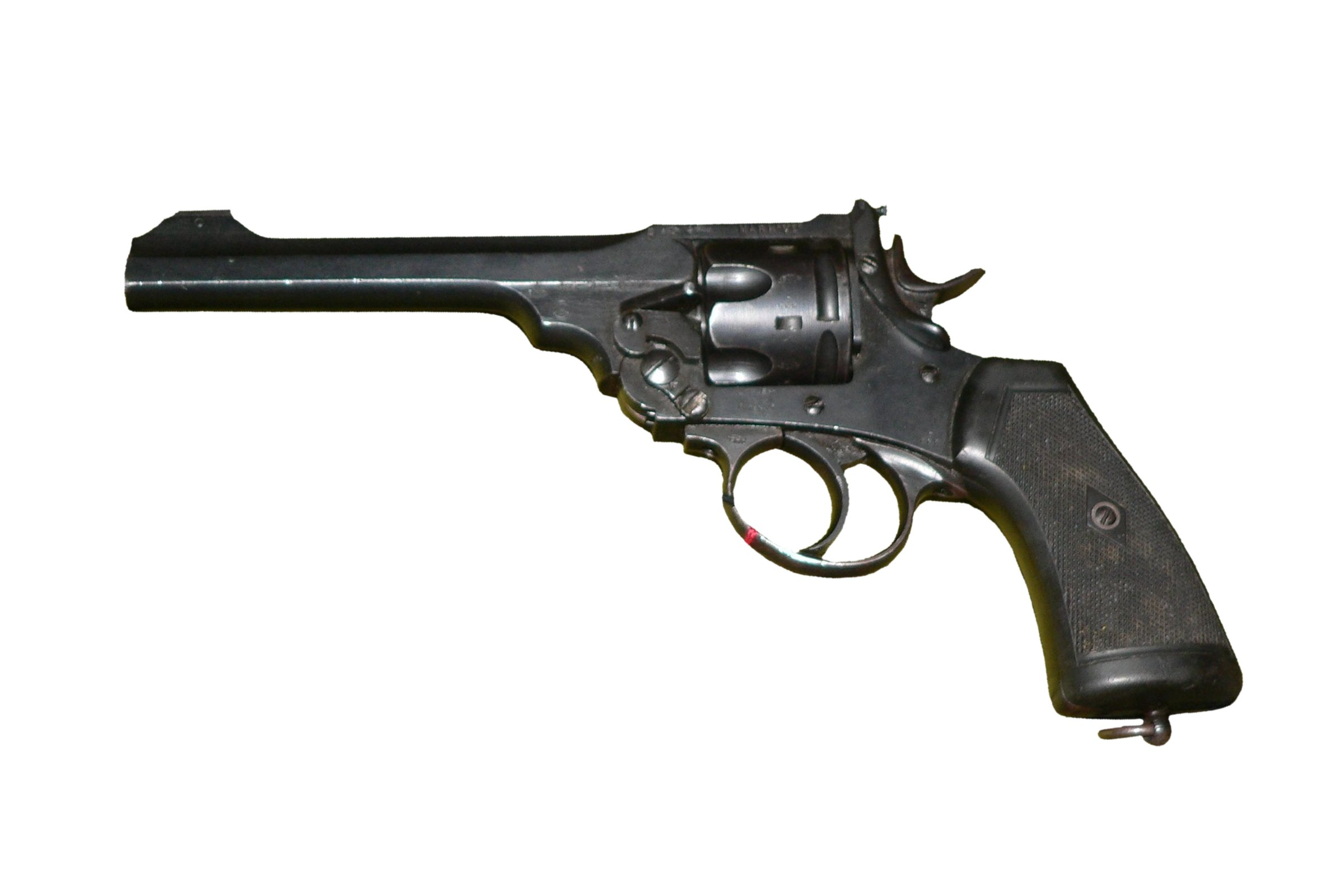
.455 Webley

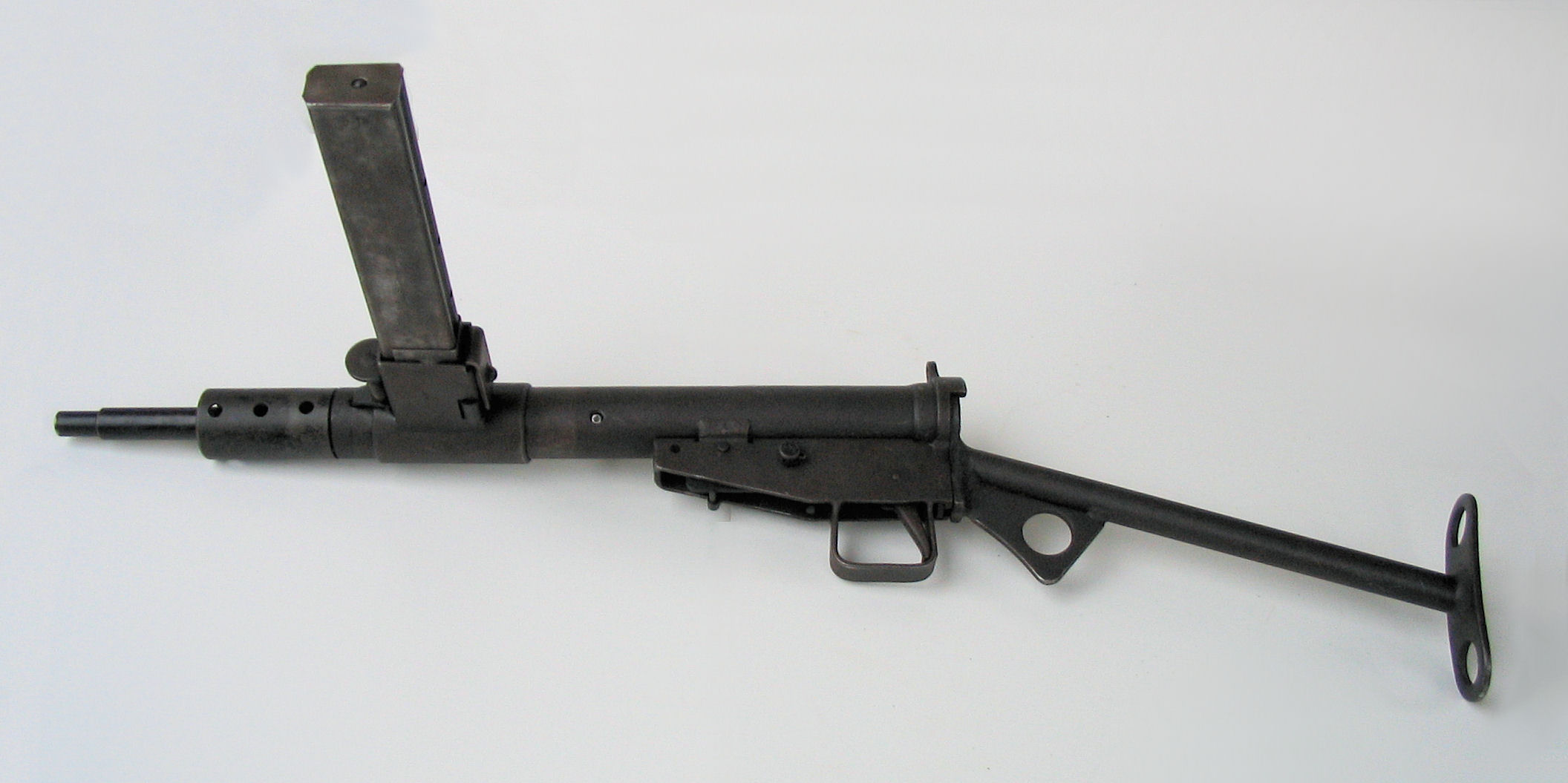
Sten gun

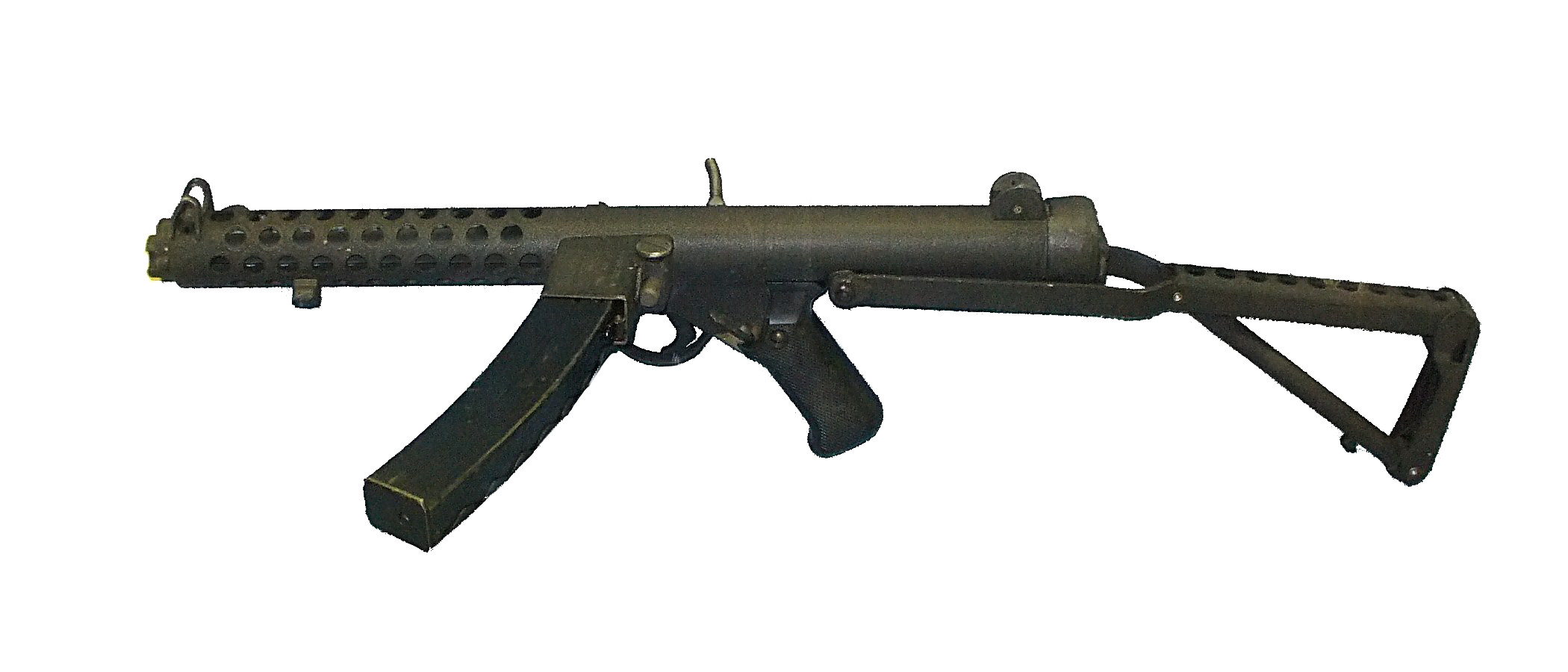
Sterling SMG

The standard of training was varied. In Belfast, the Specials were trained in much the same way as the regular police whereas in rural areas the USC was focused on counter-guerrilla operations. In 1922, B Specials received two weeks training and A Specials were initially given six weeks training. The amount of training was clearly inadequate for a conflict that warranted the deployment of professionally trained soldiers.

Uniforms were not available at the outset so the men of the B Specials went on duty in their civilian clothes wearing an armband to signify they were Specials. Uniforms did not become available until 1922. Uniforms took the same pattern as RIC/RUC dress with high collared tunics. Badges of rank were displayed on the right forearm of the jacket.

The Special Constables were armed with Webley .38 revolvers and also Lee–Enfield rifles and bayonets. By the 1960s Sten and Sterling submachine guns were also used. In most cases these weapons were retained at home by the constables along with a quantity of ammunition. One of the reasons for this was to enable rapid call out of platoons, via a runner from the local RUC station, without the need to issue arms from a central armoury.

'A Special' platoons were fully mobile using a Ford car for the officer in charge, two armoured cars and four Crossley Tenders (one for each of the sections).

B Specials generally deployed on foot but could be supplied with vehicles from the police pool.

== Irish War of Independence (1920–22) ==
Deployment of the USC during the Anglo-Irish War provided the Northern Ireland government with its own territorial militia to fight the IRA. The use of Specials to reinforce the RIC also allowed for the re-opening of over 20 barracks in rural areas which had previously been abandoned because of IRA attacks. The cost of maintaining the USC in 1921–22 was £1,500,000.

Their conduct towards the Catholic population was criticised on a number of occasions. In February 1921, Specials and UVF men burned down ten Catholic houses in the County Fermanagh village of Roslea after a Special who lived in the village was shot and wounded. Following the death of a Special Constable near Newry on 8 June 1921, it was alleged that Specials and an armed mob were involved in the burning of 161 Catholic homes and the death of 10 Catholics. An inquest advised that the Special Constabulary "should not be allowed into any locality occupied by people of an opposite denomination." The government suggested the recruitment of more Catholics to form "Catholic only" patrols to cover Catholic areas, but this was not acted upon.

After the Truce between the IRA and the British on 11 July 1921, the USC was demobilised by the British and the IRA was given official recognition while peace talks were ongoing. However, the force was remobilised in November 1921, after security powers were transferred from London to the Northern Ireland Government.

Michael Collins planned a clandestine guerrilla campaign against Northern Ireland using the IRA. In early 1922, he sent IRA units to the border areas and arms to northern units. On 6 December the Northern authorities ordered an end to the Truce with the IRA.

The Special Constabulary was, as well as an auxiliary to the police, effectively an army under the control of the Northern Ireland administration. By incorporating the former UVF into the USC as the C1 Specials, the Belfast government had created a mobile reserve of at least two brigades of experienced troops in addition to the A and B Classes who, between them, made up at least another operational infantry brigade, which could be used in the event of further hostilities, and were in early 1922.

=== 1922: Border conflict and reprisals ===
The USC's most intense period of deployment was in the first half of 1922, when conditions of a low-intensity war existed along the new Irish border between the Free State and Northern Ireland.

The Anglo-Irish Treaty had agreed the partition of Ireland, between the Irish Free State and Northern Ireland. The IRA, although now split over the Treaty, continued offensive operations in Northern Ireland, with the co-operation of Michael Collins, leader of the Free State, and Liam Lynch, leader of the Anti-Treaty IRA faction. This was despite the Craig-Collins Agreement which was signed by the leaders of Northern Ireland and the Free State on 30 March, and envisaged the end of IRA activity and a reduced role for the USC.

The renewed IRA campaign involved attacking barracks, burning commercial buildings and making a large-scale incursion into Northern Ireland, occupying Belleek and Pettigo in May–June, which was repulsed after heavy fighting, including British use of artillery on 8 June.

The British Army was only used in the Pettigo and Belleek actions. Therefore, the main job of counter-insurgency in this border conflict fell to the Special Constabulary while the RIC/RUC patrolled the interior. Forty-nine Special Constables were killed during the period of the "Border War", out of a total of eighty-one British forces killed in Northern Ireland. (Note: Another 530 civilians and 35 IRA men were killed in the Northern conflict of 1920–1922.) Their biggest single loss of life came at Clones in February 1922, when a patrol which entered the Free State refused to surrender to the local IRA garrison and took four dead and eight wounded in a firefight.

In addition to action against the IRA, the USC may have been involved in a number of attacks on Catholic civilians in reprisal for IRA actions, for example, in Belfast, the McMahon Murders of March 1922, in which six Catholics were killed, and the Arnon Street killings a week later which killed another six. On 2 May 1922, in revenge for the IRA killing of six policemen in counties Londonderry and Tyrone, Special Constables killed nine Catholic civilians in the area.

The conflict never formally ended but petered out in June 1922, with the outbreak of the Irish Civil War in the Free State and the wholesale arrest and internment of IRA activists in the North. Collins continued to arrange the supply of arms covertly to the Northern IRA until shortly before his death in August 1922.

Assessments of the USC's role in this conflict vary. Unionists have written that the Special Constabulary, "saved Northern Ireland from anarchy" and "subdued the IRA", while nationalist authors have judged that their treatment of the Catholic community, including, "widespread harassment and a significant number of reprisal killings" permanently alienated nationalists from the USC itself and more broadly, from the Northern Irish state.

== 1920s to 1940s ==
After the end of the 1920–22 conflict, the Special Constabulary was re-organised. The regular Royal Ulster Constabulary (RUC) took over normal policing duties.

In September 1924 2,000 members of the Special Constabulary were mobilized along the border in Counties Fermanagh and south Tyrone. Due to a lack of funding from the British Parliament, on 9 December 1925 both the 'A' and 'C' categories of the USC were disbanded, leaving only the less expensive B-Specials, which functioned as a permanent reserve force, armed and uniformed in the same manner as the RUC.

The Special Constabulary were called out during the 12 July period in Belfast in 1931 after sectarian rioting broke out. The B Specials were tasked to relieve the RUC from normal duties, to allow them and the British Army to deal with the disturbances.

In 1936 the British advocacy group - the National Council for Civil Liberties characterized the USC as "nothing but the organised army of the Unionist party".

During the Second World War, the USC was mobilised to serve in Britain's Home Guard, which unusually, was put under the command of the police rather than the British Army.

== 1950s – IRA Border Campaign ==
Between 1956 and 1962, 1,000 members of the Special Constabulary were again mobilised to combat the Border Campaign launched by the IRA.

Damage to property during this period was £1 million and the overall cost of the campaign was £10 million to the UK exchequer. Historian Tim Pat Coogan said of the USC, "The B Specials were the rock on which any mass movement by the IRA in the North has inevitably floundered." Six RUC and eleven IRA men (but no Special Constables) were killed in this campaign.

The IRA called off their campaign in February 1962. The number of mobilized B Specials was reduced to 300 in 1963 and by 1968 only 125 were active.

== 1969 deployment ==
The USC were deployed in 1969 to support the RUC in the 1969 Northern Ireland riots. The B Specials' role in these events led to its disbandment the following year.

Northern Ireland had been destabilised by disturbances arising out of the Northern Ireland Civil Rights Association's (NICRA) agitation for equal rights for Catholics. Loyalist attackers on NICRA marches (or those organised by People's Democracy, such as in the Burntollet Bridge incident) were often treated leniently by security forces. The government's ban on all civil rights marches resulted in serious rioting. The USC were mobilised when the regular RUC were overstretched by riots in Derry (known as the Battle of the Bogside). The NICRA called for protests elsewhere to support those in Derry, leading to the violence spreading throughout Northern Ireland, especially in Belfast.

The USC were largely held in reserve in July and only hesitantly committed in August. The general officer commanding of the British Army in Northern Ireland refused to allow the Army to become involved until the Belfast administration has used "all the forces at its disposal". This meant that the B Specials had to be deployed, although they were not trained or equipped for public order situations. The unsuitability of the use of the B Specials in such situations was clear: "The 'Specials', untrained for such a job, contained no Catholic members, were inevitably regarded as sectarian, and their presence tended to heighten rather than lower tension in Catholic areas." In August 1969 the IRA Chief of Staff Cathal Goulding issued a statement saying that his men were deployed in Belfast in a defensive capacity protecting Catholics who had been "terrorized by mobs backed by armed B-Specials." Goulding also stated that British troops would be in a "very perilous situation" until the B-Specials were disarmed and disbanded.

The two main centres of disturbance were in Belfast and Derry. A total of 300 Special Constables were also mobilised into the RUC during the disturbances. Some Constables were used to restrain a Protestant crowd in Derry, but others in this area joined in an exchange of petrol bombs and missiles with a Catholic crowd while another group led an attack on the Rossville Street area of the Catholic Bogside on 12 August.

In Belfast, the USC were successful in restoring order in the predominantly Protestant Shankill area, where they performed their patrol duties unarmed. On one occasion, the Comber Platoon was petrol-bombed by a hostile Protestant crowd at Inglis's bakery as it tried to protect Catholics who were going to work. They also successfully protected Catholic owned public houses in the area, many of which were looted after they were withdrawn. However, on 14 August they did not hold back Protestants who attacked the Catholic Dover and Percy streets in the Falls/Divis district, and instead "fought back" Catholics there.

=== USC shootings ===
The USC's most controversial conduct in the 1969 riots came in provincial towns, where the Special Constabulary formed the main response to the rioting. The Specials, who were armed and not trained for riot duty, used deadly force on a number of occasions.

The USC shot and wounded a number of people in Dungiven and Coalisland. In Dungannon, they killed one and wounded two. In the following Scarman Tribunal, the findings said "...the Tribunal has been at a loss to find any explanation for the shooting, which it is satisfied was a reckless and irresponsible thing to do."

When Jack Lynch, the Taoiseach of Ireland, moved Irish Army troops up to the border in response to the rioting, platoons of Specials were deployed to guard border police stations.

Arising out the disturbances, the British Prime Minister Harold Wilson announced that the B Specials would be "phased out of their current role". The British Government commissioned three reports into the policing response to the 1969 riots. These ultimately led to the disbanding of the Ulster Special Constabulary.

=== The Cameron Report ===
Sir John Cameron was requested to submit a report on the disturbances in Northern Ireland.

He found some evidence of cross-membership of the USC and loyalist paramilitary organisations. He reported that in Major Ronald Bunting's Ulster Protestant Volunteers (UPV), there was definite evidence of dual membership by Special Constables, of which he said "we consider highly undesirable and not in the public interest". He also remarked that although "recruitment is open to both Protestant and Roman Catholic: in practice we are in no doubt that it is almost if not wholly impossible for a Roman Catholic recruit to be accepted." The Cameron Report described the B-Specials as "a partisan and paramilitary force recruited exclusively from Protestants."

Cameron recommended that the purposes of the USC as a reserve civilian police force, as well as a counter-insurgency reserve, be properly made known in recruitment and training so that it would be more attractive to Catholics.

=== The Scarman Report ===
The Hon Justice Scarman, in his report on the rioting, was critical of the RUC's senior officers and of the way the B Specials were deployed into areas of civil disturbance which they had no training to deal with, which in some occasions led to a worsening of the situation. He also pointed out that the B Specials were the only reserve available to the RUC and that he could see no other way of quickly reinforcing the over-stretched RUC in the circumstances. He praised the Specials where he felt it was due.

Scarman concluded in his report on the civil disturbance in the region in 1969 that: "Undoubtedly mistakes were made and certain individual officers acted wrongly on occasions. But the general case of a partisan force co-operating with Protestant mobs to attack Catholic people is devoid of substance, and we reject it utterly."

Scarman went on to criticise the Command and Control of the RUC for deploying armed Special Constables in areas where their very presence would "heighten tension", as he was in no doubt that they were "Totally distrusted by the Catholics, who saw them as the strong arm of the Protestant ascendancy".

Scarman concluded that it would have been very difficult for Catholics to gain membership in 1969, even if they had applied to join.

=== The Hunt Report ===
The abolition of the B Specials was a central demand of the Northern Ireland Civil Rights Movement in the late 1960s.

On 30 April 1970, the USC was finally stood down, as a result of the Hunt Committee Report. Hunt concluded that the perceived bias of the Special Constabulary, whether true or not, had to be addressed. One of his other major concerns was the use of the police force for carrying out military style operations. His recommendations included:

(47) A locally recruited part-time force, under the control of the G.O.C., Northern Ireland, should be raised as soon as possible for such duties as may be laid upon it. The force, together with the police volunteer reserve, should replace the Ulster Special Constabulary (paragraph 171).

== Disbandment ==
The Ulster Special Constabulary was disbanded in May 1970. It has been argued that their failure to deal with the 1969 disturbances was due to a failure on behalf of the Northern Ireland government to modernise their equipment, weaponry, training and approach to the job.

On the disbandment of the USC, many of its members joined the newly established Ulster Defence Regiment (UDR), the part-time security force which replaced the B Specials. Unlike the Special Constabulary, the UDR was placed under military control. Other B Specials joined the new Part Time Reserve of the RUC. The USC continued to do duties for a month after the formation of the UDR and RUC Reserve to give both of the new forces time to consolidate.

In the final handover to the Ulster Defence Regiment, the B Specials had to surrender their weapons and uniforms. Despite the government's concerns about the handover of weapons and equipment, every single uniform and every single weapon was handed in.

After implementation of the Hunt report, the last night of duties for most B Men was 31 March 1970. On 1 April 1970 the Ulster Defence Regiment began duties. Initially, the regiment had 4,000 members who worked part-time while the new special constabulary, the RUC Reserve which replaced the B-Specials, initially consisted of 1,500 members.

== Continuing influence ==
An Orange Order banner dedicated to the USC, London, June 2007

Since disbandment the USC has assumed a place of "almost mythic proportions" within unionist folklore, whereas in the nationalist community they are still reviled as the Protestant only, armed wing of the unionist government "associated with the worst examples of unfair treatment of Catholics in Northern Ireland by the police force". An Orange lodge was formed to commemorate the disbandment of the force called "Ulster Special Constabulary LOL No 1970". An Ulster Special Constabulary Association was also set up soon after the disbandment.

=== Museum ===
In August 2025, the former RUC police station in Loughgall, County Armagh, was turned into a museum dedicated to the B Specials. A parade and ceremony took place for the opening of the Ulster Special Constabulary Museum. The event was attended by Gavin Robinson and Carla Lockhart.

== Notable members ==
- Major Kenneth Wiggins Maginnis, Baron Maginnis of Drumglass

== See also ==
- Auxiliary constable
- Auxiliary police
- Alexander Robinson
- Special constable
- Special constabulary
- Special police
- Good Friday Agreement
- Timeline of the Irish War of Independence

== Bibliography ==
- Bew, Paul; Gibbon, Peter; Patterson, Henry (2002). Northern Ireland: 1921 / 2001 Political Forces and Social Classes. London: Serif. ISBN 1-897959-38-9.
- Bourke, Richard (2003). Peace in Ireland: The War of Ideas. Pimlico. ISBN 1-84413-316-8.
- Bryan, Dominic (2000). Orange Parades: The Politics of Ritual, Tradition and Control. Pluto Press. ISBN 0-7453-1413-9.
- Coogan, Tim Pat (2000). The I.R.A. (Fully revised and updated, paperback ed.). HarperCollins. ISBN 0-00-653155-5.
- Curtis, Liz (1995). The Cause of Ireland: From the United Irishmen to Partition. Belfast: Beyond the Pale Publications. ISBN 978-0-9514229-6-0.
- Doherty, Richard (2004). The Thin Green Line – The History of the Royal Ulster Constabulary GC. Pen & Sword Books. ISBN 1-84415-058-5.
- Elliott, Sydney; Flackes, William D. (1999). Conflict in Northern Ireland: An Encyclopaedia. ABC-CLIO. ISBN 9780874369892.
- Ellison, Graham; Smyth, Jim (2000). The Crowned Harp: Policing Northern Ireland. Pluto Press. ISBN 0-7453-1393-0.
- English, Richard; Townshend, Charles (1998). The State:Historical and Political Dimensions. Routledge. ISBN 0415154774.
- Farrell, Michael (1976). Northern Ireland: The Orange State. Pluto Press. ISBN 0-902818-87-2.
- Farrell, Michael (1983). Arming the Protestants: The Formation of the Ulster Special Constabulary and the Royal Ulster Constabulary 1920–27. Pluto Press. ISBN 0-86104-705-2.
- Fitzgibbon, Constantine (1971). Red Hand: The Ulster Colony. Michael Joseph. ISBN 978-0-7181-0881-6.
- Hennessey, Thomas (1997). A History of Northern Ireland 1920 – 1996. Dublin: Gill & Macmillan. ISBN 0-7171-2400-2.
- Hezlet, Arthur (1972). The B-Specials: A History of the Ulster Special Constabulary. Tom Stacey Limited. ISBN 0-85468-272-4.
- Hopkinson, Michael (2004). The Irish War of Independence. Dublin: Gill & Macmillan. ISBN 0-7171-3741-4.
- Hopkinson, Michael (2004). Green against Green, the Irish Civil War. Dublin: Gill & Macmillan. ISBN 978-0-7171-1202-9.
- Lynch, Robert (2006). The Northern IRA and the Early Years of Partition. Dublin: Irish Academic Press. ISBN 0-7165-3377-4.
- Macready, G.F.N., Sir (1924). Annals of an Active Life. Vol. 2. London.
- Magee, John (1974). Northern Ireland: Crisis and Conflict. Routledge. ISBN 0-7100-7946-X.
- Orr, David R (2013). RUC Spearhead: The RUC Reserve Force 1950–1970. Redcoat Publishing. ISBN 978-0-9538367-4-1.
- Parkinson, Alan F. (2004). Belfast's Unholy War. Four Courts Press. ISBN 1-85182-792-7.
- Potter, John Furniss, Major (2001). A Testimony to Courage – the Regimental History of the Ulster Defence Regiment 1969 – 1992. Pen & Sword Books. ISBN 0-85052-819-4.
- Roche, Patrick J.; Barton, Brian (2013). The Northern Ireland Question: Myth and Reality. Wordzworth. ISBN 978-1783240005.
- Steffens, Johannes (2007). The police forces of Northern Ireland – history, perception and problems. GRIN Verlag. ISBN 978-3-638-75341-8.
