= Hunt Report =

1969 report on policing in Northern Ireland

The Hunt Report, or the Report of the Advisory Committee on Police in Northern Ireland, was produced by a committee headed by Baron Hunt in 1969. An investigation was performed into the perceived bias in policing in Northern Ireland against Catholics and other unprofessional practices. The Hunt Report was published on 10 October 1969 and placed emphasis on the fact that in the Royal Ulster Constabulary (RUC) Catholics represented only 11% and that there were no Catholic members of the Ulster Special Constabulary (USC). The report proposed removing the military function from the RUC, the disbandment of the USC (widely referred to as the B Specials), and their replacement of their military function to a new locally-recruited part time force, which became the Ulster Defense Regiment (UDR). Most of the main proposals of the Hunt Report were implemented, and the B-Specials were disbanded in March 1970. The reaction from some in the Unionist community was aggressive. Constable Victor Arbuckle was shot and killed on the day after the publishing of the Hunt Report when the RUC attempted to disperse a crowd of Unionists that had gathered near the Catholic area of Unity Flats. Constable Arbuckle was the first RUC man killed in what became known as The Troubles. The killing of Constable Arbuckle was carried out by members of the Ulster loyalist paramilitary group the Ulster Volunteer Force. Critics would later state that the UDR displayed problems of bias and a difficulty with maintaining a balance of Catholic/Protestant membership, similar to its forerunners.

== Motivation, scope and recommendations ==
Civil Rights groups in Northern Ireland in the 1960s had campaigned for the repeal of the Special Powers Act and the disbandment of the B-Specials. On 26 August 1969 Hunt was appointed to:

examine the recruitment, organisation, structure and composition of the Royal Ulster Constabulary and the Ulster Special Constabulary and their respective functions and to recommend as necessary what changes are required to provide for the efficient enforcement of law and order in Northern Ireland.

Robert Mark was also a member of the committee. Hunt made 47 recommendations and 5 suggestions. These resulted in the reshaping of the Royal Ulster Constabulary, the disbandment of the Ulster Special Constabulary, and the formation of the Ulster Defence Regiment.
