= 1922 in Ireland =

- Centuries: 18th; 19th; 20th; 21st
- Decades: 1900s; 1910s; 1920s; 1930s; 1940s
- See also: 1922 in the United Kingdom; 1922 in Northern Ireland; Other events of 1922; List of years in Ireland

Events from the year 1922 in Ireland.

== Incumbents ==
- Governor-General: Tim Healy (from 6 December 1922)
- Chairman of the Provisional Government:
  - Michael Collins (from 16 January 1922 until 22 August 1922)
  - W. T. Cosgrave (from 22 August 1922 until 6 December 1922)
- President of the Executive Council: W. T. Cosgrave (from 6 December 1922)
- Vice-President of the Executive Council: Kevin O'Higgins (CnaG) (from 6 December 1922)
- Minister for Finance:
  - Michael Collins (CnaG) (until 22 August 1922)
  - W. T. Cosgrave (CnaG) (from 22 August 1922)
- Dáil:
  - 2nd (until 8 June 1922)
  - 3rd (from 9 September 1922)
- Seanad: 1922 Seanad (from 6 December 1922)

== Events ==
=== January–February ===
- 2 January – the first edition of the newspaper Poblacht na hÉireann is published. It is established by Irish republican opponents to the Anglo-Irish Treaty who declare their fealty to the Irish Republic.
- 6 January – the terms of the Anglo-Irish Treaty are published. Éamon de Valera offers his resignation as president.
- 7 January – Dáil Éireann votes on the Treaty following Arthur Griffith's motion for approval. The result is 64 in favour and 57 against.
- 9 January – Éamon de Valera fails to be re-elected as President of the Irish Republic.
- 10 January – Arthur Griffith is elected President of the Provisional Government. Michael Collins becomes Minister for Finance. De Valera and 56 of his supporters walk out of Dáil Éireann.
- 12 January – the Government of the United Kingdom releases remaining Irish prisoners captured in the War of Independence.
- 16 January
  - The Provisional Government of Ireland first meets as a transitional entity to ensure the establishment of the Irish Free State by the end of 1922.
  - Dublin Castle is handed over to the Irish Republican Army (IRA).
  - The 2nd Southern Division of the Irish Republican Army, led by Ernie O'Malley, repudiates the authority of its GHQ.
- 30 January – the first meeting of the committee to draft a constitution for the Irish Free State takes place under the chairmanship of Michael Collins.
- 31 January
  - The first unit of the new National Army, a former IRA unit of the Dublin Guard, takes possession of Beggars Bush Barracks, the first British military transfer to the new State (formal handover 1 February).
  - The first edition of Iris Oifigiúil is published: it is the newspaper of record of the state and replaces The Dublin Gazette (7 November 1705–27 January 1922).
- 7 February – at the opening of the Parliament of the United Kingdom in Westminster, King George V of the United Kingdom says that the world is anxiously awaiting the final establishment of the Irish Free State.
- 10 February – the Irish Free State (Agreement) Act 1922 is introduced in the British House of Commons. It provides for the dissolution of the Parliament of Southern Ireland and the election of a parliament to which the Provisional Government will be responsible.
- 11 February – Clones Affray (County Monaghan): gun battle at Clones railway station between IRA volunteers and members of the Ulster Special Constabulary travelling to Belfast; five killed.
- 12 February – at the launch of the Republican Party, Éamon de Valera says that the Treaty denies the sovereignty of the Irish people.
- 17 February – existing British postage stamps issued with overprint Rialtas Sealadach na hÉireann 1922.
- 18 February – Liam Forde, Officer Commanding the Irish Republican Army Mid-Limerick Brigade, proclaims that it no longer recognises Collins's authority.
- February – the Civic Guard – predecessor of the Garda Síochána – is established as a police force to replace the Royal Irish Constabulary in areas outside Dublin and Ulster.

=== March–April ===
- 22 March – senior officer Rory O'Connor declares that the Irish Republican Army will no longer obey Dáil Éireann.
- 1 April
  - The British Government orders the release of all Irish prisoners in British prisons convicted of sedition.
  - The Irish Post Office takes over responsibility for its own operations.
- 26–28 April – Dunmanway killings: Thirteen Protestant men, suspected of involvement as or with informants to the British Army, are killed in and around Dunmanway, County Cork.
- 14 April – Rory O'Connor, with 200 other anti-Treaty Irish Republican Army men under his command, occupies the Four Courts building in the centre of Dublin in defiance of the Provisional Government.
- 26 April – the Irish Catholic Church hierarchy implores the people of Ireland to accept the Treaty and to make the best of the freedom which it brings.

=== May–June ===
- 4 May – a conference at the Mansion House, Dublin, between both sections of the Irish Republican Army secures a three-day truce.
- 15 May – the Civic Guard Mutiny begins in Kildare.
- 16 May – the final group of British troops leave the Curragh Camp.
- 19 May – the Irish Republican Army, with Collins's covert support, attempts to launch a "Northern Offensive" in Ulster.
- 20 May – a "pact" between de Valera and Collins provides that Sinn Féin contest election as a single party
- 22 May – two hundred men, all Catholics, are arrested and interned under the Special Powers Act after a period of public disorder and the murder of a member of the Parliament of Northern Ireland, mostly on HMS Argenta prison ship moored in Belfast Lough. They include national spokesman Sean Nethercott and national leader Cahir Healy.
- June – the first aircraft of the Air Corps arrives at Baldonnel Aerodrome.
- 1 June – official founding of the Royal Ulster Constabulary.
- 12 June – at Windsor Castle in England, King George V receives the colours of the six Irish regiments that are to be disbanded – the Royal Irish Regiment, the Connaught Rangers, the South Irish Horse, the Prince of Wales's Leinster Regiment, the Royal Munster Fusiliers and the Royal Dublin Fusiliers.
- 16 June – pro-treaty candidates receive 75 percent of the vote in the general election.

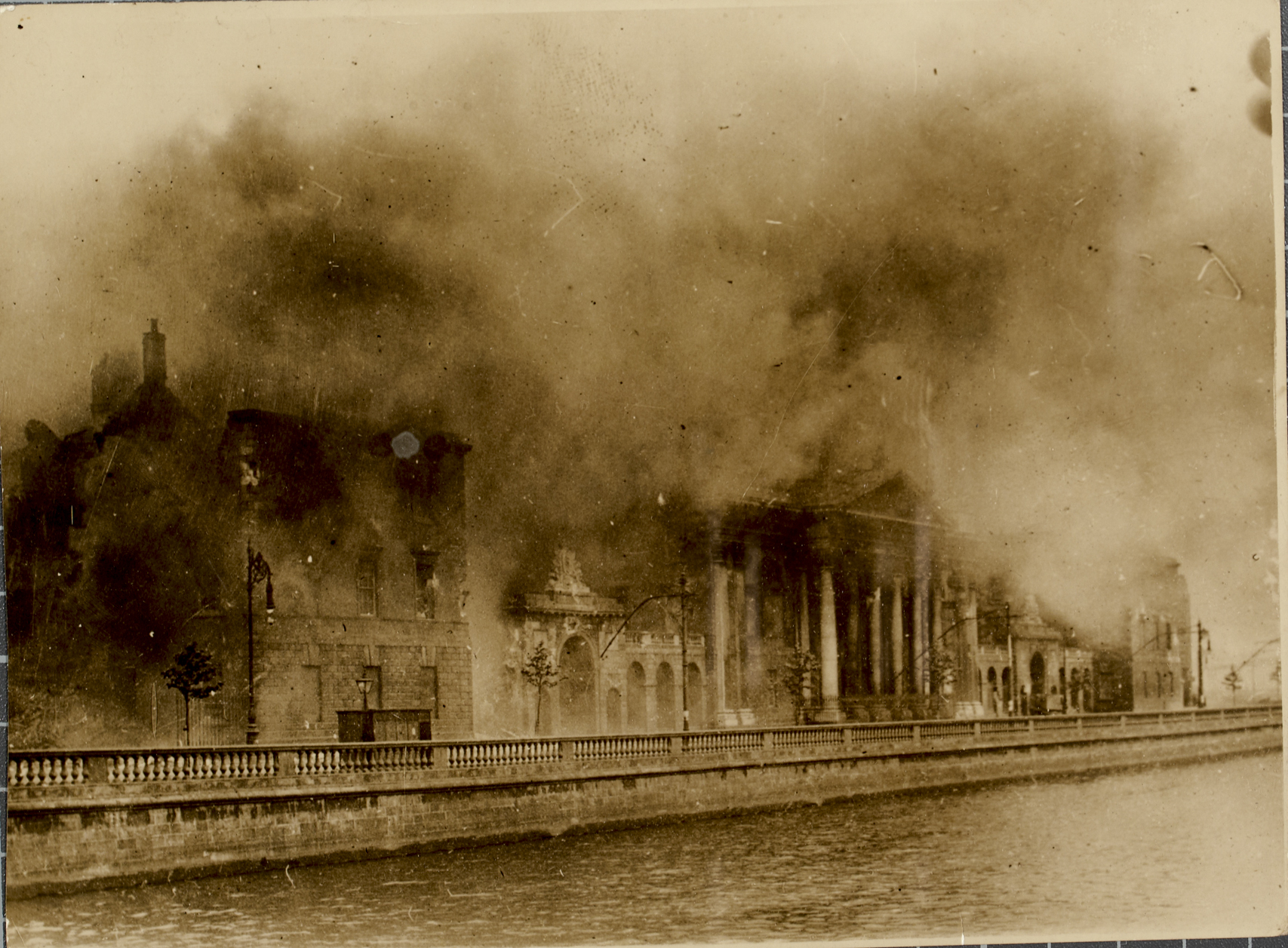
30 June – the Four Courts on fire during the Battle of Dublin.

- 22 June – IRA agents assassinate British field marshal Sir Henry Wilson in London (they are sentenced to death on 18 July).
- 28 June – the Irish Civil War and Battle of Dublin begin when the National Army, using artillery loaned by the British, begins to bombard the anti-Treaty Irish Republican Army forces occupying the Four Courts.
- 29 June – the National Army storms the Four Courts, taking 33 prisoners with the loss of three of their men.
- 30 June – there is a major explosion in the Four Courts. On orders from Oscar Traynor, Ernie O'Malley surrenders the garrison to Brigadier General Paddy Daly of the Free State's Dublin Guard. Three republicans have died in the siege.

=== July–August ===
- 4 July – the anti-Treaty Irish Republican Army captures Skibbereen and Listowel, effectively clearing pro-Treaty troops from County Cork and establishing the "Munster Republic".
- 5 July – end of the Battle of Dublin. Cathal Brugha refuses to surrender himself and is badly wounded as he tries to leave his garrison in the Hamman Hotel, dying two days later.
- 8 July – the National Army takes Blessington.
- 13 July – the Free State government appoints a War Council, comprising Michael Collins, Richard Mulcahy and Eoin O'Duffy, to direct military operations against the Irregulars.
- 16 July – three hundred IRA members are captured in Dundalk, County Louth, by the National Army. Seventy more surrender in County Sligo and their last stronghold in County Donegal is captured.
- 19 July – the National Army secures Limerick.
- 20 July – IRA surrender Waterford.
- 24 July – a National Army force lands near Westport, County Mayo, and the IRA abandons the town.
- 27 July – 105 IRA prisoners escape from Dundalk Gaol.
- 30 July – the Dublin Guard take Bruree.
- 31 July – Éamon de Valera's Private Secretary, Harry Boland, is seriously wounded while resisting arrest in a hotel room in Dublin.
- 2 August – the Dublin Guard lands from a ship at Fenit and begins to drive the IRA out of County Kerry.
- 3 August
  - National Army troops driving south cross the River Shannon at Kilrush.
  - IRA detachment led by Dan Breen lose Carrick-on-Suir to a National Army column.
- 5 August – the National Army enters Kilmallock.
- 7–8 August – National Army forces commanded by Emmet Dalton, embark on ships in Dublin, landing at Youghal, Union Hall and Passage West to retake County Cork from the "Munster Republic".
- 8 August – IRA blows up rail and road viaducts at Ballyvoile in County Waterford.
- 10 August – the National Army secures the city of Cork; end of the "Munster Republic".
- 11 August – Fermoy is abandoned to the National Army.
- 12 August – Arthur Griffith dies suddenly in Dublin. He founded Sinn Féin, was a supporter of national self-reliance and led the Treaty negotiations in 1921.
- 16 August – the funeral of Arthur Griffith takes place at Glasnevin Cemetery in Dublin. W. T. Cosgrave delivers the graveside oration.
- 17 August – Dublin Castle is formally handed over to the National Army as the last British Army troops leave.
- 19 August – remaining units of the Irish Republican Army are ordered to adopt guerrilla tactics.
- 22 August – Michael Collins is killed in an ambush at Béal na Bláth, County Cork. In his 32 years of life he fought during the Easter Rising in 1916, was a member of the delegation that negotiated the Treaty in 1921 and at the time of his death was Commander-in-Chief of the government forces.
- 28 August – all businesses close for the day as a mark of respect for the funeral of Michael Collins which takes place today. Richard Mulcahy delivers the graveside oration.

=== September–October ===
- 9 September – the first meeting of the Provisional Parliament, or the 3rd Dáil, takes place at Leinster House. W. T. Cosgrave is elected President of Dáil Éireann and Chairman of the Provisional Government.
- 17 September – W. T. Cosgrave introduces the Constitution of Saorstát Éireann Bill to enable the implementation of the Treaty between Great Britain and Ireland.
- 16 October – two men, James Ambrose and Daniel King, are killed by shots fired into a car traveling from Newcastle West to Ballyquirk, Limerick.
- 26 October – the standing committee of Sinn Féin last meets before the party de facto dissolves.

=== November–December ===
- 17 November – four IRA prisoners are executed by firing squad at Kilmainham Gaol after conviction by an Irish military court for the unlawful possession of guns.
- 24 November – Erskine Childers is executed by firing squad at Beggars Bush Barracks after conviction by an Irish military court for the unlawful possession of a gun, a weapon presented to him by Michael Collins in 1920 as a gift.
- 5 December – the Parliament of the United Kingdom enacts the Irish Free State Constitution Act, by which it legally sanctions the new Constitution of the Irish Free State.
- 6 December
  - Twelve months after the signing of the Treaty the Irish Free State officially comes into existence.
  - First domestically designed 2d postage stamp issued depicting a map of Ireland and inscribed Éire.
  - The office of Lord Lieutenant of Ireland is abolished and replaced by the offices of Governor-General of the Irish Free State (held by Timothy Michael Healy) and Governor of Northern Ireland (held by the Duke of Abercorn).
- 7 December – the Parliament of Northern Ireland votes to remain part of the United Kingdom, effective from 8 December.
- 10 December – anti-Treaty IRA men set fire to the home of Seán McGarry. His seven-year-old son, Emmet, is badly burned and dies.
- 11 December
  - Seanad Éireann first meets.
  - Existing British postage stamps issued with overprint Saorstát Éireann 1922 (an overprint of "Rialtas Sealadach na hÉireann 1922" had been used since 17 February).
  - Pope Pius XI sends a message to the government of the Irish Free State praying for a "happy era of peace and prosperity".
- 12 December – The Duke of Abercorn becomes first Governor of Northern Ireland, a post he holds until 1945.
- 13 December – the Oireachtas meets for the first time, at Leinster House in Dublin. The Governor-General, Tim Healy, delivers the first address to both houses. A message from King George V is also read out.
- Undated – the names of King's County and Queen's County are informally changed to Offaly and Laois respectively.

See also Timeline of the Irish Civil War

== Arts and literature ==
- 2 February – James Joyce's novel Ulysses is first published complete in book form by Sylvia Beach in Paris on his 40th birthday.
- John Lavery paints Michael Collins (Love of Ireland).

== Sport ==
=== Football ===
- League of Ireland
  Winners: St James's Gate (first ever competition)
  FAI Cup
  Winners: St James's Gate 1–1, 1–0 Shamrock Rovers (first ever competition, played at Dalymount Park, Dublin, 17 March; replay at same venue 8 April)

=== Gaelic Games ===
- The All-Ireland Champions are Kilkenny (hurling) and Dublin (Gaelic football)

== Births ==
- 9 January – Patrick Denis O'Donnell, military historian, writer and Commandant of the Irish Defence Forces (died 2005).
- 10 January – Terence Kilmartin, member of the British Special Operations Executive, journalist and translator (died 1991).
- 26 January – Seán Flanagan, captain of winning Mayo All Ireland football teams in the 1950s, Fianna Fáil TD, Cabinet Minister and MEP (died 1993).
- 22 February – Joe Carr, amateur golfer (died 2004).
- 7 March – Paddy Clancy, folk singer (died 1998).
- 4 April – Máire Mhac an tSaoi, Irish language scholar and academic.
- 25 April – Tommy Maher, Kilkenny hurler and coach (died 2015).
- 28 April – Proinsias Ó Maonaigh, fiddle player (died 2006).
- 4 June – Terry de Valera, youngest son of Éamon de Valera and Sinéad de Valera, solicitor, Taxing Master of Supreme Court until 1992 (died 2007).
- 14 June – Kevin Roche, architect (died 2019 in the United States).
- 12 July – Reginald Lyons, cricketer (died 1976).
- 14 July – Bríd Mahon, folklorist (died 2008).
- 15 July – Cathal Ó Sándair, writer (born in England; died 1996).
- 30 July – James Dooge, Fine Gael TD and Cabinet Minister (died 2010).
- 8 September – Kathleen Ryan, actress (died 1985).
- 11 September – Freddie Anderson, playwright and socialist (died 2001).
- 17 September – Thomas Finlay, judge, politician and barrister (died 2017)
- 27 September – James Wilson, composer (died 2005).
- 1 October – Neil Blaney, Fianna Fáil TD, Cabinet Minister and MEP (died 1995).
- 25 October – Brendan Cauldwell, actor (died 2006).
- 28 October – Con Murphy, Cork hurler and President of the Gaelic Athletic Association (died 2007).
- 23 November – Denis Gallagher, Fianna Fáil TD and Cabinet Minister (died 2001).
- 24 November – Richard Leech, actor (died 2004).
- 3 December – Kit Lawlor, soccer player (died 2004).
- 19 December – Eamonn Andrews, broadcaster (died 1987).

== Deaths ==
- 5 January – Ernest Shackleton, explorer, remembered for his Antarctic expedition of 1914–1916 in the ship Endurance, died on South Georgia (born 1874).
- 11 January – Thomas Lough, Liberal politician in Britain, Lord Lieutenant of Cavan (born 1850).
- 1 February
  - Harry Hammon Lyster, recipient of the Victoria Cross for gallantry in 1858 at Calpee, India (born 1830).
  - William Desmond Taylor, film director in the United States, murdered in the U.S. (born 1872).
- 3 February – John Butler Yeats, artist and father of W. B. Yeats and Jack Butler Yeats (born 1839).
- 16 April – Frank Lawless, Sinn Féin TD, member of the First Dáil and the Second Dáil (born 1870).
- 29 April – Richard Croker, politician in the United States and a leader of New York City's Tammany Hall (born 1843).
- 11 May – Ricard O'Sullivan Burke, nationalist, Fenian activist, Union soldier in the American Civil War, U.S. Republican Party campaigner and public works engineer, died in the U.S. (born 1838).
- 22 May – William J. Twaddell, Ulster Unionist Party MP, assassinated by Irish Republican Army (born 1884).
- 31 May – Joseph McGuinness, Sinn Féin MP and TD, member of the First Dáil (born 1875).
- 22 June – Sir Henry Wilson, British Field Marshal and Conservative Party politician, killed by the IRA in London (born 1864).
- 7 July – Cathal Brugha, active in Easter Rising, Irish War of Independence, and Irish Civil War and first Ceann Comhairle of Dáil Éireann, shot by Free State troops (born 1874).
- 26 July – John Clark, boxer (born 1849).
- 2 August – Harry Boland, Irish Volunteer in Easter Rising, Sinn Féin MP, shot by members of the Free State National Army (born 1887).
- 12 August – Arthur Griffith, founder and third leader of Sinn Féin, served as President of Dáil Éireann (born 1872).
- 22 August – Michael Collins, Revolutionary and Commander-in-Chief of the Irish Free State Army, Cabinet Minister, shot and killed (born 1890).
- 21 September – Frederick Thomas Trouton, physicist responsible for Trouton's Rule (born 1863).
- 24 November – Erskine Childers, writer, nationalist, executed by Free State firing squad (born 1870).
- 28 November – Anna Haslam, women's rights activist, suffragist (born 1829).
- 8 December – executed in Mountjoy Jail during the Irish Civil War
  - Richard Barrett, Irish Republican Army member (born 1889).
  - Joe McKelvey, Irish Republican Army officer (born 1898).
  - Liam Mellows, Sinn Féin politician, member of First Dáil (born 1895).
  - Rory O'Connor, Irish republican activist, captured at the fall of the Four Courts (born 1883).
- 20 December – Séamus Dwyer, Sinn Féin politician, shot (born 1886).
- 25 December – Joseph MacDonagh, anti-Treaty Sinn Féin member of First Dáil representing Tipperary North, insurance broker (born 1883).

== See also ==
- 1922 in Scotland
- 1922 in Wales
