= Northern IRA offensive (1922) =

Part of the Irish revolutionary period

- Part of the Irish revolutionary period
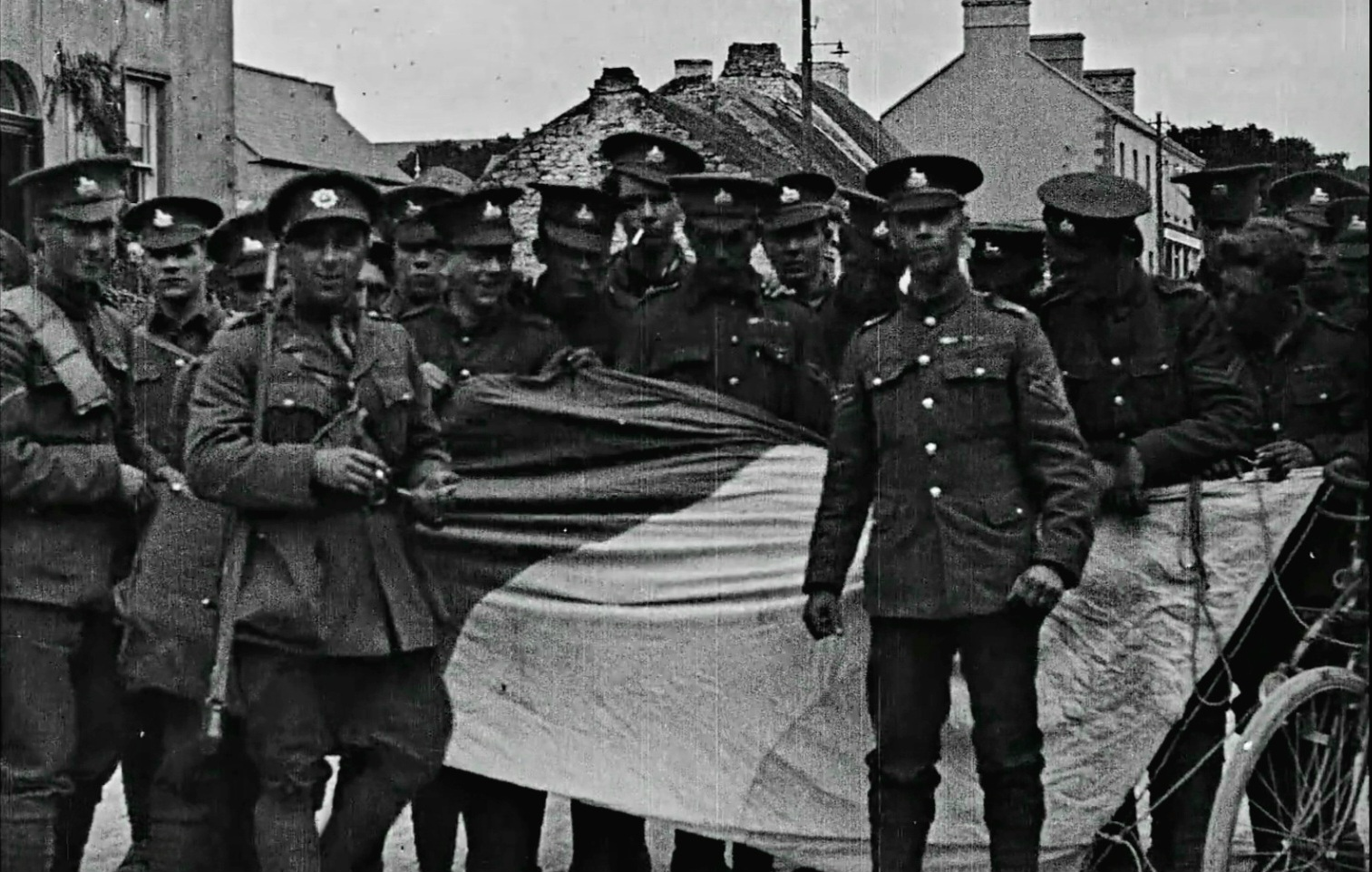
- British troops displaying a captured IRA flag after the recapture of Belleek, June 1922
Date	2 May – June 1922
Location	Northern Ireland and border areas of County Donegal
Result	British victory

Belligerents
Irish Republic: Anti-Treaty IRA; Pro-Treaty IRA (elements)	United Kingdom: Royal Ulster Constabulary; Ulster Special Constabulary

Commanders and leaders
Michael Collins; Seán Lehane; Charles Daly; Frank Aiken	Sir Arthur Solly-Flood; Charles Wickham

Strength
~4,000–5,000	~30,000 USC, police and British Army

The Northern IRA offensive, also known as the Border Campaign, was a series of military operations conducted by the Irish Republican Army (IRA) in Northern Ireland between May and June 1922, following the partition of Ireland. Supported by Michael Collins, the campaign aimed to undermine the newly established Northern Ireland government, challenge partition and pressure the British government into reconsidering the border.

Conducted mainly by IRA units in the border counties and Belfast, the offensive involved attacks on police barracks, ambushes and disruption of communications. The largest engagements were the battles of Pettigo and Belleek in June where the IRA were defeated by British troops. The campaign was accompanied by widespread sectarian violence, including attacks and reprisals against Catholic and Protestant civilians.

The offensive ultimately collapsed under pressure from the Northern Ireland security forces, particularly the Ulster Special Constabulary, and the outbreak of the Irish Civil War in June 1922. It failed to overturn partition or significantly weaken the Northern Ireland government, while the northern IRA was left increasingly isolated. The subsequent Irish Boundary Commission proposed limited territorial changes, but the existing border was retained in 1925.

== Background ==
The Government of Ireland Act 1920 provided for the partition of Ireland, establishing Northern Ireland from six of Ulster's nine counties, with its own devolved parliament and government within the United Kingdom. The Act also established Southern Ireland, although its institutions largely failed to function during the Irish War of Independence. The Anglo-Irish Treaty, signed in December 1921, provided for the creation of the Irish Free State, while allowing Northern Ireland to remain outside it. Article 12 of the Treaty established an Irish Boundary Commission to reconsider the border, raising nationalist hopes that substantial areas of Northern Ireland would be transferred to the Free State.

Partition was opposed by Irish republicans, who sought an independent and united Ireland. The Treaty also divided the republican movement. Supporters, including Michael Collins, chairman of the Provisional Government, accepted it as a means of securing substantial independence, while opponents rejected the continued constitutional ties to the British Crown and the partition settlement. Despite these differences, both factions remained opposed to the permanent division of Ireland.

Northern Ireland had experienced widespread political and sectarian violence since 1920, particularly in Belfast. Following the expulsion of thousands of Catholic and some Protestant workers from the city's shipyards and other workplaces in July 1920, violence escalated into rioting, shootings, arson and retaliatory killings. The conflict involved republican and loyalist paramilitaries, the security forces and civilians. Catholics suffered disproportionately from killings, intimidation and displacement, although Protestants were also among the victims.

The violence continued despite the July 1921 truce between British forces and the IRA, intensifying during the early months of 1922. The failure of political efforts to restore stability and continued opposition to partition contributed to plans for a renewed IRA campaign in Northern Ireland. Collins supported preparations for an offensive intended to put pressure on the Northern Ireland government while maintaining cooperation between pro- and anti-Treaty IRA units.

=== IRA planning ===
Michael Collins secretly supported plans for an IRA offensive in Northern Ireland and maintained contact with republican commanders there. In January 1922, he established an "Ulster Council" to coordinate IRA activity in the North, comprising the commanders of the five northern divisions, with Frank Aiken appointed chairman. Collins hoped that the offensive would undermine the Northern Ireland government while maintaining cooperation between pro- and anti-Treaty republicans. Weapons and ammunition were also secretly supplied to northern IRA units through arrangements involving the National Army and anti-Treaty IRA forces.

On 22 April, senior IRA officer Seamus Woods convened a meeting of northern IRA commanders, who agreed to launch coordinated attacks across Northern Ireland. The offensive was scheduled to begin on 2 May, but most divisions postponed their operations until later in the month. The delays prevented the simultaneous attacks originally envisaged by the IRA leadership and weakened the coordination of the campaign.

=== Special Powers Act ===
The Civil Authorities (Special Powers) Act became law on 7 April 1922, granting the Northern Ireland government extensive emergency powers to maintain public order. These included internment without trial, arrests and searches without warrants, restrictions on public meetings and publications, and the imposition of curfews. The legislation also provided for severe penalties, including flogging for certain offences. The Minister of Home Affairs, Richard Dawson Bates, could have introduced further regulations without prior parliamentary approval and delegate his powers to police officers.

The Act was introduced amid escalating violence and was defended by Unionists as necessary to restore law and order. Nationalists, however, feared that its powers would be used disproportionately against the Catholic population. During a debate in the House of Commons on 28 March, Joseph Devlin, the nationalist MP for Belfast Falls, criticised the proposed legislation following the killings of members of the McMahon family in Belfast. He stated: "If Catholics have no revolvers they are murdered. If they have revolvers they are flogged or sentenced to death."

== Offensive ==
The IRA's 2nd Northern Division, operating mainly in counties Londonderry and Tyrone, began its offensive on 2 May 1922, despite the postponement of the wider campaign. Difficulties with preparations, communications and the distribution of arms prevented the northern divisions from launching simultaneous attacks, leaving the 2nd Northern Division initially without the expected support of other IRA units.

On 2 May, IRA units attacked police barracks at Bellaghy, Draperstown and Coalisland. Although none of the barracks was captured, an RIC officer and an IRA volunteer were killed. The offensive also involved attacks on police patrols and the disruption of transport and communications infrastructure. The following day, three members of the Ulster Special Constabulary (USC) were shot dead at Ballyronan, while another was killed in an ambush on a mobile patrol at Corvanaghan.

The wider offensive resumed in mid-May, with IRA units launching further attacks on police barracks and security forces. On 19 May, the IRA attacked Martinstown RIC barracks in County Antrim with rifle fire and grenades. Although the barracks was not captured, the attackers ambushed a party of USC reinforcements, killing one Special Constable.

One of the most serious episodes of retaliatory violence occurred at Desertmartin, County Londonderry, on 19 May. Following the burning of a Unionist-owned flax mill in the village, a crowd of loyalists and members of the security forces attacked Catholic homes and businesses, setting fire to several properties. Uniformed Special Constables subsequently entered Catholic households in the surrounding district and abducted four men from the McGeehan and Higgins families. The victims were taken to a secluded country lane and shot dead. The killings were regarded as reprisals for the destruction of the mill and the continuing IRA campaign.

The threat of further reprisals was also made explicit in contemporary warnings. On 19 May, notices appeared in Cookstown, County Tyrone: "Take notice that, if any more attacks are made on members of the RIC or Loyalists, reprisals at the rate of 10 to one will be made on prominent and known Sinn Feiners. God save the King".

=== Belfast ===
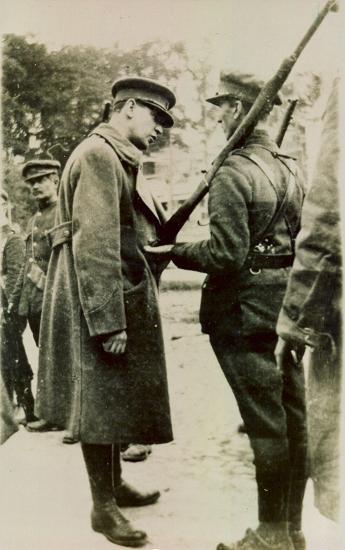
Michael Collins (left) inspects a National Army soldier in 1922

Operations in Belfast began on 18 May with a raid on the Musgrave Street RIC barracks in the city centre. The objective was to capture armoured cars and weaponry, and a unit infiltrated the building before having to fight its way out when the guards were alerted. One RIC constable was killed and another wounded in the attack. Ernest Woods quoted a loyalist reaction to the raid: "The whole Loyalist population is at a loss to know how such a raid could be attempted during curfew hours on the headquarters in Belfast and the largest barrack in Ireland. They are in a state of panic."

The IRA also carried out numerous firebomb attacks, and dozens of fires blazed across Belfast. The campaign was accompanied by further reprisals and sectarian violence in the newly formed Northern Ireland. On 19 May, 71 Catholic families were driven from their homes in Belfast, and on 31 May a further 78 Catholic families were driven out. The sectarian attacks were not confined to one side. On 19 May, workmen at a cooperage in Little Patrick Street were lined up and asked their religion, and four Protestant workers were separated from their Catholic workmates and shot dead.

On 22 May, IRA members assassinated William J. Twaddell, a Unionist member of the House of Commons of Northern Ireland, in Belfast. The killing prompted the Northern Ireland government to intensify its security measures under the recently enacted Special Powers Act. Hundreds of suspected republicans and Sinn Féin members were arrested and interned without trial, with detainees drawn from Belfast and several border counties. Republican organisations were also declared illegal.

The Northern Ireland government's security crackdown and internment soon began to cripple the IRA in Northern Ireland. In a major blow to the IRA, a raid on a house in Belfast uncovered a list of IRA officers in the city and documents proving the involvement of southern IRA leaders. The USC were mobilised in large numbers to carry out patrols and raids, and a nighttime curfew was imposed across Northern Ireland. The failure to launch simultaneous attacks across Northern Ireland also undermined the campaign, leaving individual IRA divisions without the support originally envisaged.

=== Attacks in Armagh and Antrim ===
Despite the setbacks suffered during the May offensive, IRA activity continued into June 1922, particularly in the border districts of south County Armagh, where Frank Aiken's 4th Northern Division remained active. The campaign coincided with changes in policing following partition. As the Royal Irish Constabulary (RIC) was being disbanded, the Royal Ulster Constabulary (RUC) was established on 1 June as Northern Ireland's new police force, with Lieutenant-colonel Charles Wickham appointed its first inspector-general. Wickham had previously commanded the Ulster Special Constabulary (USC), which continued to undertake security operations during the unrest. Major-general Arthur Solly-Flood, appointed military adviser to the Northern Ireland government in April, also exercised considerable authority over the USC and security policy. Their overlapping responsibilities created tensions within the Northern Ireland security administration.

IRA attacks on the USC increased in south Armagh during early June. On 13 June, two Catholic civilians, Patrick Creggan and Thomas Crawley, were abducted and shot dead, their bodies subsequently being discovered beside a road at Lislea, near Newry. The killings were attributed to members of the USC, although the perpetrators were not conclusively identified. The following day, Specials attacked the home and public house of the McGuill family at Drumintee, County Armagh, where two women, including Mrs McGuill, were sexually assaulted. These incidents contributed to a further escalation of violence in the district.

On 17 June, approximately fifty IRA volunteers under Aiken ambushed a USC patrol at Drumintee, killing at least one Special Constable and wounding another. Some accounts reported a second fatality. The ambush was carried out in retaliation for attacks attributed to the Specials, particularly the assaults on the McGuill household. Aiken later claimed that his 4th Northern Division had killed at least sixty Specials between Christmas 1921 and June 1922, although this was his own estimate.

During the same night, members of Aiken's division carried out a series of attacks on Protestant households in the townlands of Altnaveigh and Lisdrumliska, near Newry. Armed IRA volunteers entered houses, shot inhabitants and burned or damaged several properties. Six Protestant civilians were killed, including members of the Crozier, Heslip, Lockhart and Gray families, while twelve houses were attacked. The killings became one of the most controversial incidents of the northern campaign. IRA participants described the operation as retaliation for the killing of local Catholics, particularly Creggan and Crawley, and attacks attributed to the Specials. Historian Robert Lynch has examined the differing motives behind the Drumintee ambush and the Altnaveigh killings, including the extent to which sectarian considerations influenced the selection of victims. The attacks heightened tensions and insecurity among Protestant communities in the border region.

Violence continued elsewhere in Northern Ireland. On the night of 23 June, one day after the assassination of Sir Henry Wilson in London, a combined party of A-Specials and British soldiers entered the predominantly Catholic village of Cushendall, County Antrim. The patrol had been deployed amid reports of IRA activity in the surrounding district. During the operation, three Catholic civilians, James McAllister, John Gore and John Hill, were shot dead by members of the USC.

The Northern Ireland authorities initially claimed that the patrol had been ambushed by IRA members and that the three men had been killed during an exchange of fire. Eyewitness accounts contradicted this version, alleging that the Specials opened fire on civilians and that the victims had been deliberately shot. The killings prompted demands for an independent investigation, including questions raised in the House of Commons.

The British government subsequently appointed Barrington Ward, KC, to investigate the incident. His inquiry concluded that no one other than members of the police and military had fired shots in Cushendall and that all three victims had been killed by members of the Ulster Constabulary. The findings therefore contradicted the official account of an IRA ambush. Although the inquiry did not establish individual criminal responsibility, its findings were communicated to the Northern Ireland government. The report was not publicly released at the time.

=== Battle of the Belleek-Pettigo salient ===
During the Northern Offensive, IRA forces occupied the Belleek–Pettigo salient, a triangular area of County Fermanagh largely cut off from the rest of Northern Ireland by Lower Lough Erne and the border with County Donegal. The area's isolation made it difficult for the Northern Ireland security forces to defend, as access from the remainder of the province was restricted to routes through southern territory or across the lough.

Following the security crackdown in Belfast in late May, northern IRA volunteers gathered at Pettigo, joining republican forces already stationed along the border. After several days of skirmishing with the Ulster Special Constabulary (USC), a combined force of pro- and anti-Treaty republicans advanced into the salient on 27 May, rapidly occupying much of the territory. The operation encountered relatively little initial resistance, although a detachment of A-Specials had crossed Lough Erne by boat and established a position at Magherameena Castle, near Belleek.

The IRA's occupation of the Belleek–Pettigo salient alarmed James Craig, the Prime Minister of Northern Ireland, who requested British military intervention to restore the Northern Ireland government's authority over the area. The situation also caused concern in London, where Winston Churchill, the Secretary of State for the Colonies, sought assurances from representatives of the Irish Provisional Government that the occupation had not been authorised by Dublin. At a meeting in Downing Street, the representatives denied responsibility for the operation and repudiated the actions of the occupying forces. Churchill subsequently confirmed that British officers had been sent to establish the circumstances of the occupation. British troops were then deployed to recover the territory and remove the republican garrisons. Over the following days, British troops and Specials prepared to recapture Pettigo from a force of about 100 IRA volunteers. The operation, which involved advances by land and water, was codenamed Operation Basil.

On 4 June, the British force began its attack just after midday Mass at St. Mary's church. The force included detachments of the 1st Battalion, Lincolnshire Regiment, and the 2nd Battalion, South Staffordshire Regiment, supported by artillery.

British forces bombarded Pettigo before entering the village and forcing the IRA garrison to withdraw. Three IRA volunteers manning machine-gun posts were killed by shelling and gunfire, six were wounded and four were captured. Most of the remaining volunteers retreated into Donegal.

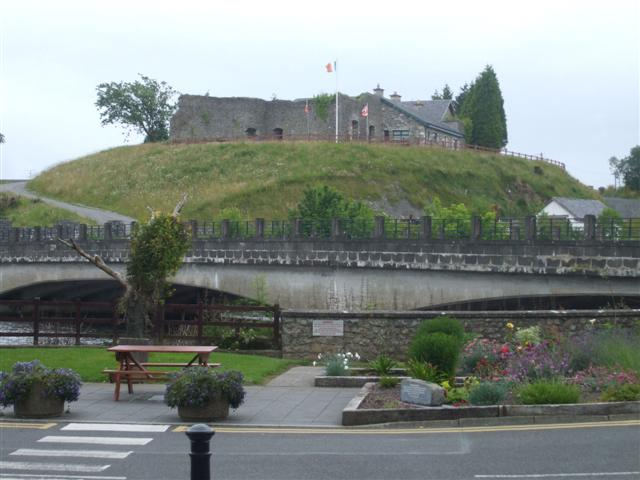
Belleek Fort in 2008

On 27 May, a USC group was sent into the area by boat and secured Magherameena Castle, near Belleek. The IRA attacked the USC, forcing them to abandon their position and withdraw to a nearby island. The IRA also commandeered the strategically situated Cliff House on the banks of the River Erne, just north-west of Belleek, a mansion owned by a USC major and Orange Order grand master. Following this, the IRA ambushed a convoy of USC reinforcements, killing the lead driver and forcing the Specials to retreat.

On the morning of 8 June, a British Army column advanced from Pettigo as part of a pincer movement to recapture Belleek. The other arm of the operation consisted of an amphibious force positioned outside the village, which remained occupied by the IRA. At 10 am, Crown forces began an artillery barrage, directed mainly at Belleek Fort, which overlooked the village from County Donegal, south of the border. After several hours of artillery and machine-gun fire, IRA forces withdrew by 1 pm, allowing the British Army to enter the village and capture Belleek Fort after a brief engagement. Newspaper reports put IRA casualties at seven killed and the total death toll as high as 30.

=== End ===
Irish nationalists in the South became distracted by the deepening split between pro-Treaty and anti-Treaty factions. In early June, the Irish Provisional Government adopted "a policy of peaceful obstruction" towards the Northern government, and Michael Collins suspended attempts to use force. Nationalist hopes for a large transfer of Northern territory to the proposed Irish Free State through the Irish Boundary Commission may also have contributed to a decrease in violence.

In Belfast, the government's response to the IRA campaign was swift and severe. Belfast IRA leader Seamus Woods described the difficulty of continuing operations: "The enemy are continually raiding and arresting; the heavy sentences and particularly the flogging making the civilians very loath to keep wanted men or arms".

By the end of the month, the level of violence in Belfast had fallen and the IRA's Northern Offensive had petered out.

== Aftermath ==
The Northern Offensive failed to achieve its principal objectives of undermining the Northern Ireland government and challenging partition. Although IRA operations caused considerable disruption, they failed to secure lasting territorial gains or seriously weaken the northern security forces. The campaign also contributed to the continuing sectarian violence, including attacks and reprisals against Catholic and Protestant civilians. The numerical strength of the Ulster Special Constabulary (USC), which numbered approximately 19,400 A and B Specials, placed the northern IRA at a considerable disadvantage.

The battles of Pettigo and Belleek saw some of the heaviest fighting between the IRA and regular British forces since the Easter Rising of 1916. They marked the first major clashes between the two sides since the July 1921 truce and were among their last military confrontations of the Irish revolutionary period. The engagements were the closest the northern IRA came to a pitched battle with the British Army and heightened tensions between the British and Irish governments. The Irish Provisional Government demanded an inquiry into the actions of British forces, but Churchill rejected the request, stating that the government considered itself fully informed of the circumstances and accepted responsibility for the military intervention. On 26 June, the British, Irish Provisional and Northern Ireland governments reached an agreement to establish a neutral zone approximately four or five miles wide around Pettigo and Belleek. British troops nevertheless continued to occupy territory south of the border, withdrawing from Pettigo in January 1923 and Belleek Fort in August 1924.

The outbreak of the Irish Civil War on 28 June 1922 further undermined the northern IRA, diverting republican attention and resources away from the campaign. Many northern volunteers subsequently travelled south, with some joining the newly formed National Army, while others remained opposed to the Anglo-Irish Treaty. Despite the failure of the offensive, some northern republicans continued to hope that military operations against partition might eventually resume.

The death of Michael Collins on 22 August dealt a further blow to these hopes. Collins had been a principal supporter of the northern IRA, and his death, together with the continuing Civil War, diminished the prospect of renewed assistance from the south. Belfast IRA Brigade commander Roger McCorley later recalled: "When Collins was killed the northern element (of the IRA) gave up all hope".

Continued pressure from the security forces forced many northern IRA volunteers to seek refuge across the border in County Donegal, where some joined anti-Treaty republican units during the Civil War. Among their commanders was Charlie Daly, a former officer of the IRA's 2nd Northern Division, who continued republican operations in Donegal and the northern border counties. Following his capture by Free State forces in November 1922, Daly was imprisoned at Drumboe Castle.

The Northern Ireland government's use of internment under the Special Powers Act continued after the collapse of the offensive. Hundreds of suspected republicans and nationalists were detained without trial, with prisoners held in Belfast Prison, Derry Gaol, Larne Workhouse and aboard the prison ship HMS Argenta, moored in Belfast Lough. By February 1923, approximately 263 men were being held aboard the vessel, where conditions were harsh and overcrowded.

By the end of 1922, political and sectarian violence in Northern Ireland had declined considerably. The relative stability continued into 1924, when internment ended and the Belfast curfew was lifted. Nevertheless, the Northern Ireland government retained the extensive emergency powers introduced under the Special Powers Act. Originally enacted as a temporary measure, it was renewed annually until 1928, extended for five years and made permanent in 1933. The legislation remained in force until 1973, when it was replaced by the Northern Ireland (Emergency Provisions) Act 1973.

The subsequent Irish Boundary Commission proposed limited territorial changes, but these were not implemented. Under an agreement reached between the British, Irish Free State and Northern Ireland governments in December 1925, the existing border was retained.

=== Memorials ===
A memorial was erected in Pettigo, County Donegal, in 1953 to commemorate four IRA volunteers who died during and shortly after the British assault. The monument, unveiled by Oscar Traynor, bears the names of the four IRA victims.

In Cushendall, a memorial on Shore Road commemorates the three Catholic men who were killed by members of the USC on 23 June, along with two men wounded in the incident. The six Protestant civilians killed at Altnaveigh on 17 June are also commemorated at services associated with Altnaveigh Orange Hall. The centenary in 2022 was marked by a memorial service and ceremonies at the victims' graves.

== See also ==
- Ulster Special Constabulary
- Civil Authorities (Special Powers) Act (Northern Ireland) 1922
- Irish Boundary Commission
