= Bloody Sunday (1921) =

Violence in Belfast in the Irish War of Independence

Belfast's Bloody Sunday
- Part of the Irish War of Independence and The Troubles in Ulster (1920–1922)
- Date: 10 July 1921
- Location: Belfast, Northern Ireland
- Methods: Rioting, gun battles, grenade attacks, house burnings
- Result: 161–200 houses destroyed, curfews imposed

Casualties and losses
- 17+ killed 100+ injured

Bloody Sunday or Belfast's Bloody Sunday was a day of violence in Belfast, Northern Ireland on 10 July 1921, during the Irish War of Independence. The violence erupted one day before a truce began, which ended the war in most of Ireland. With the truce nearing, police launched a raid against republicans, but were ambushed by the Irish Republican Army (IRA) and an officer was killed. In retaliation, Protestant loyalists attacked Catholic enclaves in west Belfast, burning homes and businesses. This sparked rioting and gun battles between Protestants and Catholics, including paramilitaries. There were also gun battles between republicans/nationalists and the police, and some police patrols fired indiscriminately at Catholic civilians. Seventeen people were killed or fatally wounded on 10 July, and a further three were killed or fatally wounded before the truce began at noon on 11 July. At least 100 people were wounded. About 200 houses were destroyed or badly damaged, most of them Catholic homes, leaving 1,000 people homeless.

== Background ==
Belfast saw almost 500 people killed from 1920 to 1922 in political and sectarian violence related to the Irish War of Independence. While most of Ireland had a Catholic and Irish nationalist majority who wanted independence, the north-east had a Protestant and Unionist majority who wanted to maintain ties to Britain. Sectarian violence started in the city of Derry in April 1920 with gun battles and rioting continuing into May. Derry saw intense violence breaking out in the city on 18 June which continued for a week. At least nineteen people were killed or fatally wounded during this time: 14 Catholics and five Protestants. Violence broke out in Belfast on 21 July 1920, when Protestant Loyalists drove 8,000 "disloyal" co-workers from their jobs in the Belfast shipyards, mostly Catholics and some Protestant labour activists. The violence was partly in reaction to increasing Irish Republican Army (IRA) attacks and was fuelled by rhetoric from Unionist politicians. More than 50 people were killed in rioting between Protestants and Catholics. In nearby Lisburn, Banbridge and Dromore loyalists burnt hundreds of Catholic businesses and homes.

There was sporadic violence in Belfast over the following year. In May 1921, Ireland was partitioned under British law, creating Northern Ireland as a self-governing territory of the United Kingdom, with Belfast as its capital. Its borders were drawn to give it a Protestant majority. Its new reserve police force, the Ulster Special Constabulary (USC), was almost wholly Protestant and some of its members carried out reprisal attacks on Catholics.

Violence increased in the summer of 1921. At the time, representatives of the self-declared Irish Republic and the British government were negotiating a truce to end the war. On 10 June, IRA volunteers shot three Royal Irish Constabulary (RIC) officers on Belfast's Falls Road, fatally wounding Constable James Glover. He had been targeted because the IRA suspected him of being part of a group of police involved in sectarian killings of Catholics. This attack sparked three days of loyalist violence, during which at least 14 people were killed, including three Catholics who were taken from their homes and killed by uniformed police. Sporadic violence continued in the city over the next month. On 8 July, police attempted to carry out searches in the Catholic enclave of Carrick Hill. However, they were confronted by about 15 IRA volunteers, leading to an hour-long firefight.

== Violence ==
On 9 July 1921, a ceasefire (or truce) was agreed between representatives of the Irish Republic and the British government, to begin at noon on 11 July. Many Protestant loyalists condemned the truce as a 'sell-out' to republicans.

On the night of 9–10 July, hours after the truce was announced, the RIC attempted to launch a police raid in the Catholic Lower Falls district of west Belfast. Scouts alerted the IRA of the raid by blowing whistles, banging dustbin lids and flashing a red light. On Raglan Street, a unit of about 14 IRA volunteers ambushed an armoured police truck, killing one officer and wounding at least two others. The officer killed was Thomas Conlon, a Catholic from County Roscommon, who, ironically, was viewed as "sympathetic" to the local nationalists.

That killing sparked a week of ferocious violence between Protestants and Catholics in west Belfast in which 22 people died. The following day, Sunday 10 July 1921, Protestants, "fearful of absorption into a Green, Catholic Ireland [...] and blindly angered by the presence of heresy and treason in their midst, struck [...] at the Catholic community" while "vengeful Catholics struck back with counter-terror". Much of the violence took place along the sectarian boundary between the Protestant Shankill and Catholic Falls districts. A "loyalist mob, several thousand strong" attempted to storm the Falls district, carrying petrol and other flammable materials. Between 161 and 200 houses were destroyed, about 150 of which were Catholic homes. The Irish News reported that the Falls district was "in a state of siege". A tram travelling from the Falls into the city centre was struck by snipers' bullets, and the service had to be suspended.

Gun battles also raged along the sectarian boundaries in the west and north of the city and rival gunmen used rifles, machine guns and hand grenades in the clashes. Gunmen were seen firing from upstairs windows, rooftops and street corners. The New York Times characterised the clashes as "a three-fold fight between Sinn Féin and Unionist snipers and Crown forces". It added, "In the extent of material damage to property, Sunday's rioting can be compared to the Dublin Rising in 1916". While the IRA was involved in some of the fighting, it did not control the actions of the Catholic community. A rival Irish nationalist group, the Hibernians, were also involved on the Catholic side.

Catholics claimed that police—mostly from the overwhelmingly-Protestant Ulster Special Constabulary (USC)—drove through Catholic enclaves in armoured cars firing indiscriminately at houses and bystanders. A 13-year-old Catholic girl, Mary McGowan, was shot dead by USC officers firing from an armoured car as she crossed the road with her mother. The inquest into her death concluded that they had "deliberately" shot the girl and added: "In the interests of peace, Special Constabulary should not be allowed into localities of people of opposite denominations". Another Catholic, William Tierney (56), was killed in his home by USC gunfire which shattered his window. One Protestant, Francis Robinson (65), was killed by police bullets as he lay in bed during an exchange of fire.

Two Catholic fathers, James McGuinness and Daniel Hughes, were killed in separate incidents by loyalist snipers while rushing to bring their children home. Meanwhile, two Protestant boys, William Baxter (12) and Ernest Park (13) were both killed apparently by the same nationalist sniper.

The police returned to their barracks late on Sunday night, allegedly after a ceasefire had been agreed by telephone between a senior RIC officer and the commander of the IRA's Belfast Brigade, Roger McCorley. The truce was due to begin at midday on Monday 11 July, but violence resumed that morning. Loyalist crowds from the Shankill attacked and looted Catholic homes. IRA officer Joe McKelvey reported that the IRA struggled to control Catholic crowds "infuriated by the burnings of their homes". Three people were shot dead that day, including IRA volunteer Seamus Ledlie, who was shot minutes before midday.

The day was referred to as "Belfast's Bloody Sunday" at the time. However the title of "Bloody Sunday" now more commonly refers in Ireland to events in Dublin in November 1920 or Derry in January 1972.

=== Casualties ===
As well as the RIC officer killed on Raglan Street, 16 people were killed and fatally wounded on Sunday; 11 Catholics and 5 Protestants. One Catholic man who was shot that day died from his wounds nine months later. Three more people were killed and fatally wounded before the start of the truce on Monday; an IRA member, a Catholic and a Protestant. Most of the dead were civilians and at least four of the Catholic victims were former soldiers who served in the First World War. More than 100 people were wounded.

== Aftermath ==
A strict curfew was enforced in Belfast after the violence. On 11 July, the Commandant of the IRA's 2nd Northern Division, Eoin O'Duffy, was sent to Belfast by the organization's leadership in Dublin to liaise with the British authorities there and try to maintain the truce. He said, "I found the city in a veritable state of war. The peal of rifles could be heard on all sides, frenzied mobs at every street corner, terror-stricken people rushing for their lives, and ambulances carrying the dead and dying to hospitals." There were no serious disturbances during the Orange Order's yearly 12 July marches, but sporadic violence resumed the following day, and by the end of the week, 28 people had been killed or fatally wounded in Belfast.

O'Duffy set up headquarters in St Mary's Hall in Belfast city centre and made contact with British forces and the press. With the tacit consent of the RIC, he organized IRA patrols in Catholic areas to try to restore order and announced that IRA action would cease except in self-defence. Both Protestants and Catholics saw the truce as a victory for republicans. Protestant unionists "were particularly appalled by the sight of policemen and soldiers meeting IRA officers on a semi-official basis". While the truce ended fighting in most of Ireland, communal violence soon resumed in Belfast. IRA members later recalled, "The Truce was not observed by either side in the north", while McCorley said the truce in Belfast "lasted six hours only".

The violence of the period in Belfast was cyclical, and the events of July 1921 were followed by a lull until a three-day period starting on 29 August, when another 20 people died in the west and north of the city.

== Sources ==
- Lynch, Robert, The Northern IRA and the Early Years of Partition, Irish Academic Press, Dublin 2006; ISBN 0-7165-3378-2
- McGarry, Fearghal, Eoin O'Duffy, a Self-Made Hero, Oxford University Press, Oxford, 2005; ISBN 978-0-19-922667-2
- Parkinson, Alan F, Belfast's Unholy War, Four Courts Press, Dublin 2004; ISBN 1-85182-792-7.
