= Charles Wickham =

Charles Wickham may refer to:

- Charles Preston Wickham (1836–1925), American congressman
- Sir Charles Wickham (police officer) (1879–1971), first Inspector-General of the Royal Ulster Constabulary
