= National Graves Association, Belfast =

Irish republican organisation

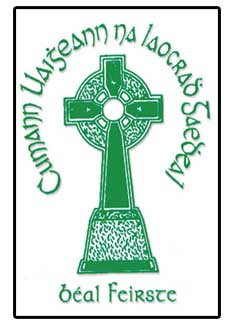
The logo of the National Graves Association, Belfast

The National Graves Association, Belfast (Irish: Cumann Uaigheann na Laocradh Gaedheal, Béal Feirste, lit. 'Grave Committee of Heroes of the Gaels, Belfast') is a private Irish republican organisation which undertakes to care for and maintain the graves of some Irish Republican Army volunteers who are buried in Belfast cemeteries. It is a separate organisation from the National Graves Association based in Dame Street, Dublin.

== Objectives and structure ==
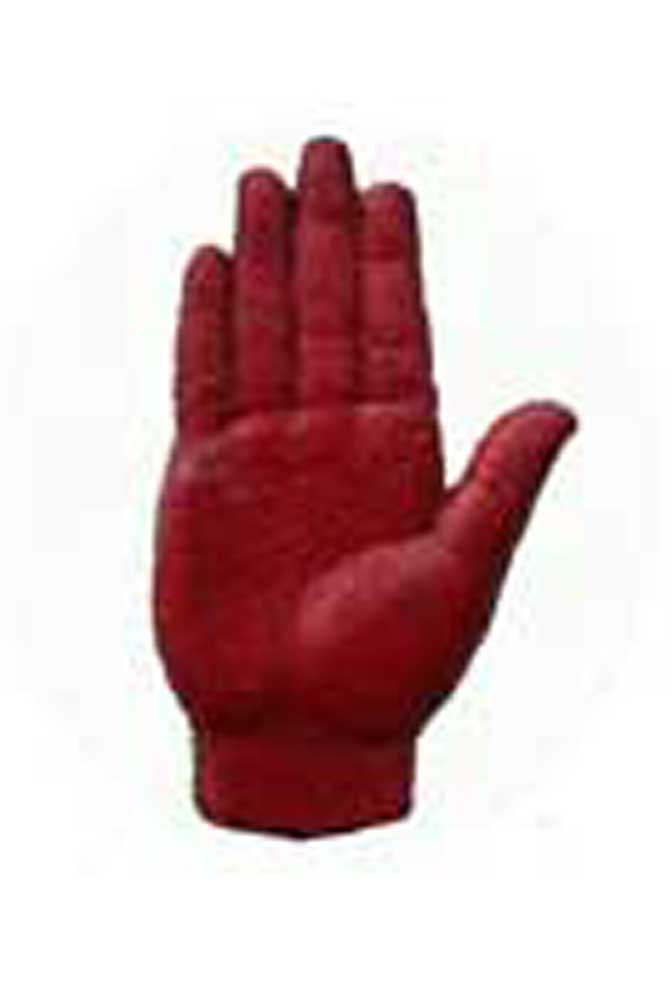
The National Graves Association, Belfast, uses Red Hand of Ulster as a symbol to identify graves under its care

The first Belfast branch of the National Graves Association was founded in the mid-1930s. Internment and imprisonment of Republicans has led to the Belfast branch, at times, becoming, temporarily inactive. National Graves Association, Belfast has as its primary objectives "to restore and maintain fittingly, the graves of all those who died for Irish Freedom, to compile a record of those graves and to foster respect for the national dead." The association has, from its inception, maintained the graves of Republicans buried in Belfast. Monuments have been erected, restored and graves have been marked and maintained. In addition to this, it has successfully campaigned for the re-interment of the remains of Tom Williams.

In recent times the committee has overseen the complete rebuilding of what has become known as the New Republican Plot, which contains the remains of 77 Republicans who have died while part of an active service unit or during imprisonment. The association is also responsible for the maintenance of the County Antrim Plot which contains the remains of 34 IRA volunteers; the Harbinson plot in which five IRA volunteers are interred, and a number of other Republican graves some from as early as the 1920s. These graves have been traditionally marked with the Red Hand of Ulster. Many Belfast Republicans are buried in their family graves and as such do not fall under the association's care. However, in addition to maintaining particular plots and monuments, the association has endeavoured to direct local commemoration committees to maintain some family graves which, for some reason may have fallen into disrepair.

The association has a committee of eleven members. The membership is made up of Republicans from across the city, former members included Liam Shannon, Bridget Hannon, Paul Di Lucia, Niall Ó'Donnaighle, In recent years the Belfast National Graves has been reorganised with Joe Austin becoming the new chairman Desi Kennedy, Aine Cahill (Deceased), Ann Murray, Loretta McKee and Stephen McGuigan remaining from the old committee, Others invited to join the graves organisation include Brendan McFarlane (Deceased), Briege Wright, Gerry Mc Clory Roseleen Walsh, Jennifer Mc Cann, Pól Wilson and Sean (Ginty) Lennon.

== Graves ==
The vast majority of work done by the National Graves Association, Belfast, is carried out in Milltown Cemetery. These graves, under the direct care of the association, include the three main republican plots and the graves of IRA volunteers who were killed during the 1920s and the Northern Campaign in the 1940s. The graves are marked with the Red Hand. Below is the full list of graves that are presently under the care of the association.

=== Harbinson Plot ===
William Harbinson, a fenian, died in 1846, while interned in Belfast Prison and was buried at Portmore, Ballinderry. In 1912 a Celtic cross was erected in Milltown to his memory and that of other republicans who were imprisoned in County Antrim jails. This plot contains the remains of 5 IRA volunteers, Joe McKelvey, Sean McCartney, Terence Perry, Sean Gaffney and Seamus Burns.

=== County Antrim Memorial Plot ===
The County Antrim Memorial was unveiled on the 50th anniversary of the Easter Rising to commemorate Antrim's republican dead. 34 IRA volunteers who died while on active service during the late 1960s and early 1970s are buried here.

=== New Republican Plot ===
In 1972 the National Graves Association Belfast, purchased the ground which would become known as the new Republican Plot. The first burials here took place in July of that year. This plot contains the remains of 77 republicans, including some who died on hunger strike. Among those buried in the plot are: James McDade, Bobby Sands, Joe McDonnell, Kieran Doherty, Sean McIlvenna, Mairéad Farrell, Dan McCann, Sean Savage, Pearse Jordan, Thomas Begley and Pat McGeown.

=== Other graves ===
A number of other graves are maintained by the National Graves Association, Belfast 33 in total. These include the graves of Seán McCaughey and Winifred Carney.

== Image gallery ==
Graves under the care of the National Graves Association, Belfast

Harbinson Plot

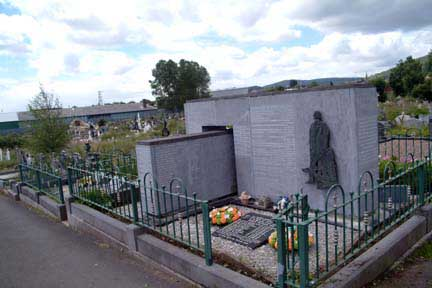
County Antrim Memorial Plot

Grave of Winifred Carney, socialist and combatant in GPO, Dublin 1916

Grave of Ned Trodden

Grave of Sean Martin

Grave of Sean Gaynor
