= Belfast Brigade (IRA) =

Brigade of the Irish Republican Army that covered Belfast

The Belfast Brigade of the Irish Republican Army (IRA) was formed in March 1921 during the Irish War of Independence, when the IRA was re-organised by its leadership in Dublin. Joe McKelvey was appointed commander of the Third Northern Division, responsible for Belfast and the surrounding area. There were three battalions within the Brigade, the 1st in West Belfast, the 2nd in North Belfast and the Third in East Belfast. Most of the Brigade's attacks on Crown forces were carried out by an Active Service Unit within the 1st battalion, led by Roger McCorley. McCorley and Seamus Woods were leaders of a very active IRA Active Service Unit in Belfast (consisted of 32 men) which targeted the Royal Irish Constabulary (RIC) - Auxiliaries and Black and Tans.

The Brigade was strengthened during the period between the end of hostilities between the IRA and British forces in July 1921 and the outbreak of the Irish Civil War in June 1922. During this time, Michael Collins, head of the new Irish Free State sent arms and money to the IRA in Belfast in an effort to de-stabilise the newly created Northern Ireland. By May 1922, the IRA in Belfast possessed over 600 rifles. They carried out many attacks on British and Northern Ireland forces during this period. In addition, they were often faced with the task of trying to defend Catholic areas of Belfast from attack by Ulster loyalist and state forces. As well as defence, though, the Brigade was also guilty of sectarian attacks, including assassinations of Protestants and the bombing of trams taking Protestant workers to workplaces that had expelled Catholics.

In May 1922, the IRA in Belfast assassinated Ulster Unionist Party MP William Twaddell. In response, the next day, the UUP government of Northern Ireland interned over 200 Irish republicans in Belfast and 350 throughout Northern Ireland. Over 750 IRA men were interned by 1923, including on the prison ship HMS Argenta.

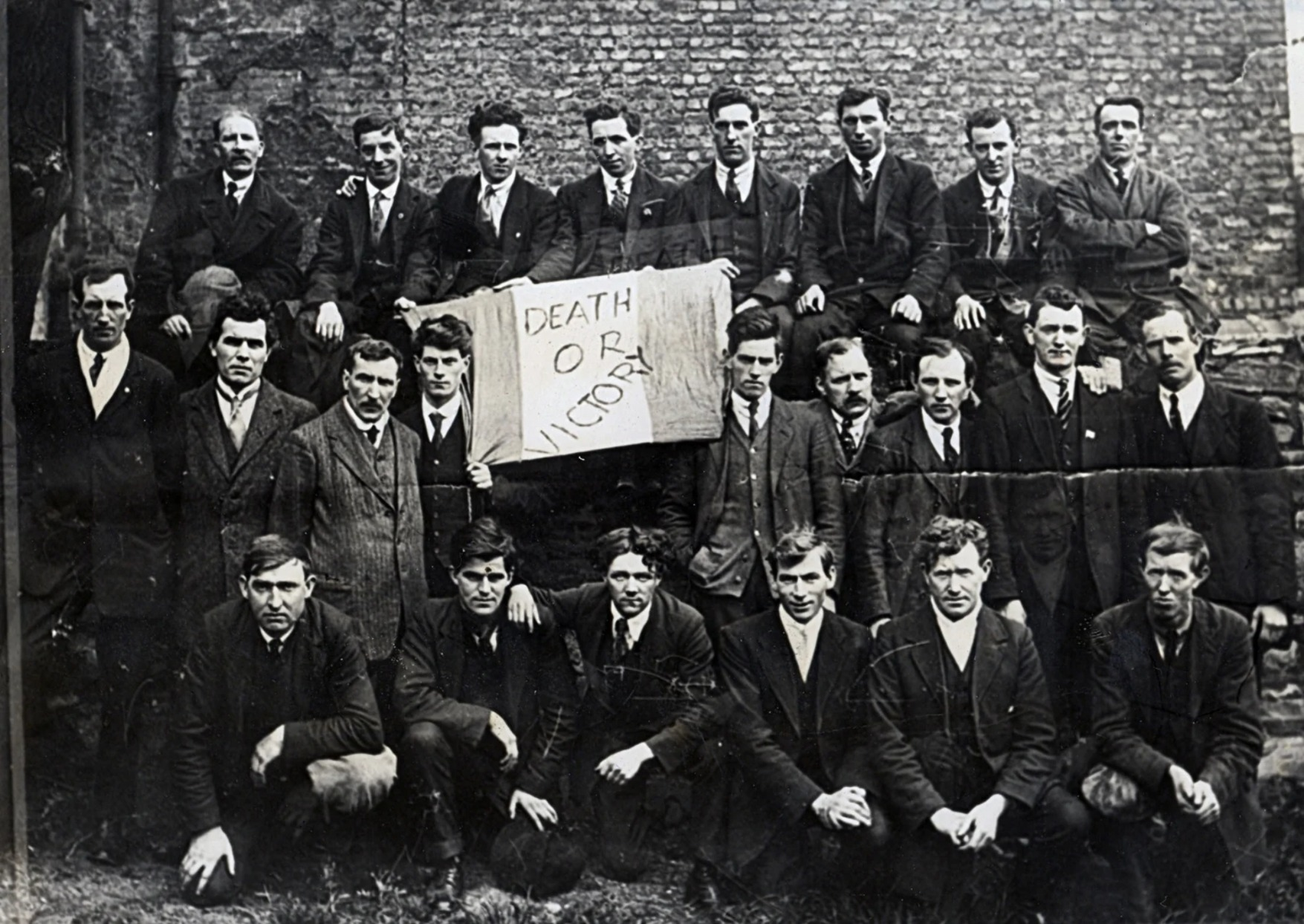
Released Belfast Hunger Strikers May 1920

This was a damaging blow to the Belfast Brigade, but more damaging still was the outbreak of the Irish Civil War on 28 June. This meant that the IRA in the south of Ireland was now split into warring factions. In addition, the aid which the Free State government had given to the northern IRA was cut off after the death of Michael Collins in August 1922. Belfast Brigade leader Roger McCorley stated: "When Collins was killed the northern element [of the IRA] gave up all hope." On top of this, Joe McKelvey, the leader of the IRA in Belfast, left the city to side with the Anti-Treaty IRA in the civil war. He was captured and subsequently executed by the Free State. Most of the other IRA leaders in Belfast supported the Anglo-Irish Treaty, as they had been persuaded that it would ultimately result in a united, independent Ireland. In addition over 1,000 IRA men in Belfast had to flee Northern Ireland to escape the repression there and around 500 of them were recruited into the pro-treaty National Army during the civil war.

As a result of these factors, the IRA in wartime Belfast lacked the will and resources to mount a renewed armed campaign. Remarkably, however, the Brigade developed a "Protestant squad", an intelligence unit, largely recruited by John Graham, a Church of Ireland devout, from Denis Ireland's Ulster Union Club.

While Graham and others in the Belfast command continued to debate the merits of a new northern campaign, in April 1942 a diversionary action, drew the RUC into a gun battle in Cawnpore Street. A police constable, father of four Thomas James Forbes, was killed, in consequence of which six of the eight members of the active unit were sentenced to hang. In the event all but one were reprieved. On 2 September 1942 Tom Williams, nineteen, was hanged the first, and only, Irish Republican to be judicially executed in the North.

In the IRA Border Campaign of the 1950s, there were no actions in Belfast.

It took the formation of the Provisional IRA and its Belfast Brigade in 1969 before republicans were again in a position to carry out attacks in Northern Ireland's capital city. The Official IRA also had a Belfast brigade which was commanded by Republican Billy McMillen, just like the Provisionals it carried a guerrilla campaign against the British forces in Ireland but they called a ceasefire in May 1972, but still carried out a handful of attack in 1973, 1974 & 1975, and they also became involved in a feud with the Provisionals, 11 people were killed in the feud & many more injured, the vast majority of attacks by both sides happened in Belfast.

The IRA of the 1920s in Belfast is the subject of the song Belfast Brigade.

== See also ==
- 3rd Cork Brigade
- 3rd Tipperary Brigade
- North Longford Flying Column
