= Tom Williams (Irish republican) =

Irish republican

- Tomás Mac Uilliam
- Born: Thomas Joseph Williams; 12 May 1923; Beechmount, Belfast, Northern Ireland
- Died: 2 September 1942 (aged 19); Crumlin Road Gaol, Belfast, Northern Ireland
- Cause of death: Executed by hanging
- Burial place: Milltown Cemetery (since 2000)
- Military career
- Allegiance: Irish Republic
- Paramilitaries: Irish Republican Army (1940–1942); Fianna Éireann (mid-1930's–1940)
- Rank: Officer Commanding
- Units: C Company, 2nd Battalion of the Belfast Brigade
- Conflicts: Northern Campaign

Thomas Joseph Williams (Irish: Tomás Mac Uilliam; 12 May 1923 – 2 September 1942) was a volunteer in C Company, 2nd Battalion of the Belfast Brigade in the Irish Republican Army (IRA) from the Bombay Street area of Belfast, Northern Ireland. He was hanged in the Crumlin Road Gaol for his involvement in the killing of Royal Ulster Constabulary (RUC) police officer Patrick Murphy during the IRAs Northern Campaign.

== Early years ==
A Plaque over 46 Bombay Street – where Tom Williams lived with his grandmother.

Williams was born at 6 Amcomri Street in the Beechmount area of Belfast in 1923. He was the third child in a family of six. His brother Richard was the eldest. A sister, Mary, died of meningitis at the age of three. Williams' mother Mary died, at the age of 29, after giving birth to his sister Sheila, who also died shortly after.

After the death of his mother, Williams and his brother then went to live with their grandmother at 46 Bombay Street in the Clonard area of Belfast. Williams' family had to leave the small Catholic enclave in the Shore Road area of Belfast before moving to Beechmount, after their house was attacked and burnt during The Troubles in Ulster (1920–1922) which followed the Irish War of Independence.

According to Williams's biographer, Jim McVeigh:

because of its defencelessness this enclave saw some of the most awful atrocities of the period, the most infamous occurring in February 1922 when loyalists threw a bomb into a group of Catholic children playing in Weaver Street, killing a number of them and grievously injuring many more. The Catholic Bishop of Down and Connor Dr MacRory, remonstrated and was quoted as saying "the butchery of my people".

Williams's uncle Terry Williams was jailed for his part in defending the Shore Road enclave during this period.

As a child, Williams suffered from asthma and as a result was often very ill. He attended St Gall's Primary School but left at an early age to obtain work, which at the time was difficult due to discrimination. His work therefore consisted of labouring and as a delivery boy.

== Na Fianna Éireann ==
As soon as Williams was old enough, he joined Na Fianna Éireann, the republican Scout Organisation founded by Countess Markievicz in 1909, becoming a member of the Con Colbert slua in the Clonard area. Alfie Hannaway, a friend of Williams was his Officer Commanding (OC) in Na Fianna, and assigned Williams to the rank of Quartermaster for the company. Williams took his role in Na Fianna very seriously and all who came to know him were struck by his dedication and maturity, even at this early age.

Most of his activities in Na Fianna took place in a small hall in Kane Street, just off Bombay Street. There they spent their time drilling, attending lectures in history, and sometimes scouted for the Irish Republican Army (IRA). With their own money the boys were able to equip the hall with a boxing ring, PT equipment and some tables and chairs.

== IRA activity ==
At the age of 17, Williams was old enough to become a volunteer and joined C Company of the IRA in the Clonard area where he lived. C Company's area of operations ran the extent of the lower Springfield Road, along the Falls Road from Beechmount to Conway Street, and surrounding the streets in between. Due to his "dedication and his remarkable ability" Williams was appointed to the role of Adjutant of C Company.

At Easter 1942 the government of Northern Ireland had banned all parades to commemorate the anniversary of the Easter Rising. An IRA unit of six men and two women staged a diversionary action against the RUC to allow three parades to take place in west Belfast, but in this clash an RUC officer was killed and the six IRA men were captured. Nineteen year old Williams was the OC of the IRA unit and was shot three times during this attack. The RUC officer, Constable Patrick Murphy, a father of nine children, from the Falls Road, was one of a minority of Catholics serving in the RUC.

There has been some debate over the years about who actually fired the fatal shot. The six IRA members were convicted and sentenced to death for murder under the law of common purpose. Five, Henry Cordner (19); William James Perry (21); Sean Terence Oliver (21); Patrick Simpson (18); and Joe Cahill (21) (who went on to become a senior figure in the IRA) had their sentences commuted. The two women were arrested and held at Armagh Jail. Williams, who acknowledged that he was the leader of the IRA unit involved, took full responsibility for the actions of his men.

== Execution ==
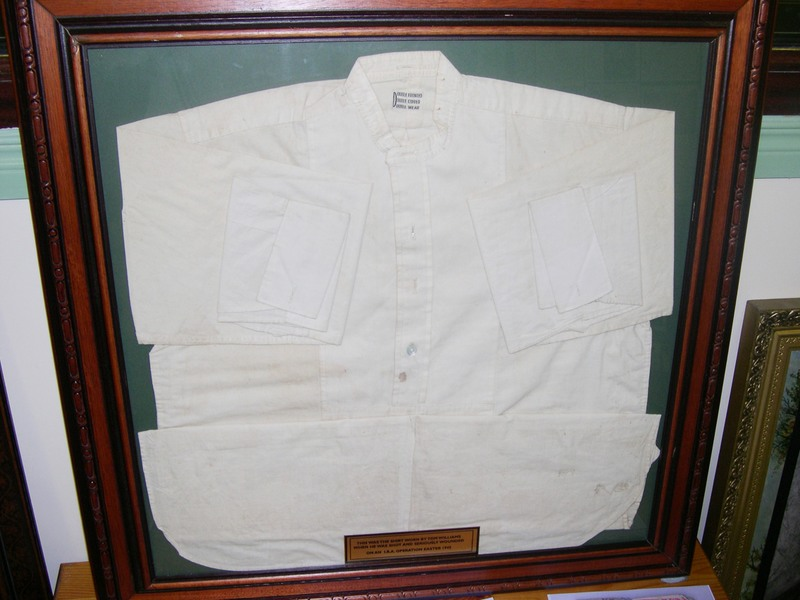
Shirt worn by Williams in which he was arrested and executed which is now an exhibit at the Irish Republican History Museum in Belfast.

Williams was hanged in Crumlin Road Gaol Belfast at 08:00 on Wednesday 2 September 1942. The executioner was the official English hangman Thomas Pierrepoint, assisted by his nephew Albert Pierrepoint. Afterwards Williams' body was interred in unhallowed ground in an unmarked grave within the grounds of the prison. His remains were only released in January 2000 after the closure of the prison in 1996 and a lengthy campaign by the National Graves Association, Belfast.

Before Williams was executed he inscribed some messages on the backs of some playing cards. On one he wrote "To ever who receives this to pray for me always & pray for the cause for which I am dying. God Save Ireland…." Williams also sent a message to the IRA Chief of Staff Hugh McAteer in which he told his comrades "To carry on, no matter what the odds are against you, carry on no matter what torments are inflicted on you. The road to freedom is paved with suffering, hardships and torture, carry on my gallant and brave comrades until that certain day."

Father Alexis, who witnessed the execution, spoke after to his friends in the prison chapel. "I met the bravest of the brave this morning", he said, "Tom Williams walked to that scaffold without a tremor in his body. The only people who were shaking were us and the hangman". Father Alexis concluded by saying to the remaining prisoners, "I've one other thing to say to you. Don't pray for Tom Williams, pray to him, for at this moment Tom is a saint in heaven."

His funeral held on 19 January 2000 was attended by thousands, with Williams buried at Milltown Cemetery. Joe Cahill, Williams' cellmate, and John Oliver, sentenced to death with Williams but later reprieved, were present. Tom's funeral Mass was celebrated by Paddy O'Donnell, a Redemptorist Priest from Clonard Monastery.

Williams' headstone at Milltown Cemetery after being reinterred

== In Irish republican culture ==
He is remembered in a ballad Tom Williams. Various recordings have been made, most notably by the Flying Column, and by Éire Óg who preamble their version with the story of the campaign to release his body. The now disbanded Volunteer Tom Williams Republican Flute Band from Glasgow, Scotland, was named in his memory, as was the Tom Williams Camogie Club in Belfast.
