= Seamus Woods =

Irish Republican Army commander

Seamus Woods commanded a division of the Irish Republican Army (IRA) during a period of intense conflict and was a senior leader of the newly formed Irish Free State army.

== Northern IRA leadership ==
Seamus Woods was born in Ballyhornan, County Down, in modern-day Northern Ireland, and prior to becoming active in Irish Republicanism was trained in accounting. Woods became a senior member of the Belfast Brigade of the IRA during the Irish War of Independence (1919–1922), commanded a IRA Division during a critical period of warfare and rose to a senior Commander position in the newly formed Irish Free State Army. In 1920 Seamus Woods was already in a leadership role as a Captain in the "radical" B Company of the Belfast Brigade. On 5 April 1920 Woods led the IRA units that successfully burned the contents of the Belfast Customs House and two Income Tax offices.

Seamus Woods claimed to have taken part in a number of attacks against British forces that resulted in the deaths of seven policemen in 1921. In 1921 Woods and Roger McCorley were leaders of a very active IRA Active Service Unit in Belfast (consisted of 32 men) which targeted the Royal Irish Constabulary (RIC) - Auxiliaries and Black and Tans. On 26 January 1921, Woods and McCorley, were involved in the fatal shooting of three Auxiliary Division officers in their beds at the Railway View hotel in central Belfast. On 23 April 1921 Woods and McCorley attacked and killed two Auxiliaries near Donegal Place in central Belfast. Woods served as a liaison officer to British forces during the truce which ended the Irish War of Independence. In March 1922 Seamus Woods was appointed Officer Commanding (O/C) of the Third Northern Division of the IRA, which saw much action in Belfast and east Ulster. Woods had replaced Joe McKelvey who had been removed from his leadership position by the IRAs General Headquarters (GHQ) due to his opposition to the Anglo-Irish Treaty of 1921 (McKelvey was executed by Free State forces on 8 December 1922). In March 1922 the O/C of the IRAs Second Northern Division Charlie Daly (who was also anti Treaty) was also dismissed by the GHQ. Daly was also executed by Free State forces (14 March 1923).

== Officer Commanding IRA Third Northern Division ==
Seamus Woods commanded the IRAs Third Northern Division (which had up to 1,000 members) during a period of intense intercommunal violence (see The Troubles in Ulster (1920–1922)). Woods friend and fellow northern IRA leader Roger McCorley described him as"...worthy of the greatest admiration. He was by nature highly strung but very cool in action. Never, on any occasion, did he try to avoid any operation." Woods claimed he had the "sympathy and support" of the Nationalist minority within Belfast: "...not so much for their national aspirations, and our fight for national freedom, but more on account of the part the army (I.R.A.) had played in defending the minority against organized attacks by uniformed and non-uniformed Crown Forces."

=== Attack on Musgrave Street Barracks and Twaddle Assassination ===
Under Woods and McCorley (and in coordination with members of the Belfast Brigade), the Third Northern Division conducted numerous attacks on RIC barracks. One of the boldest attacks was against the RIC Belfast Headquarters (Musgrave Street Barracks) on 18 May 1922. The objective of this raid was to obtain armored cars for use in the "Northern Offensive" which was due to start on the following day. 21 IRA Volunteers gained access to the barracks, held Officers under guard and attempted to steal weapons and armored vehicles. One RIC Constable was killed and another wounded. O/C Woods was quoted on this attack: "The whole Loyalist population is at a loss to know how such a raid could be attempted during curfew hours on the headquarters in Belfast and the largest barrack in Ireland. They are in a state of panic."

Woods men then embarked on a month long series of arson attacks on commercial buildings in Belfast and the mansions of wealthy Unionists in the nearby countryside. The homes of Sir Hugh O'Neill and other prominent Unionists were burned. Close to 90 premises were attacked with damage estimated at three million pounds. Multiple IRA attacks also took place in the rural areas of counties Down and Antrim. On 22 May 1922 the Northern IRA assassinated a member of the new Northern Parliament W.J. Twaddell. Twaddell was said to be a leader of a large Unionist paramilitary group the Ulster Imperial Guards. Within hours of Twaddell's assassination large scale arrests of Irish Republicans occurred with approximately 350 prisoners taken and internment introduced (only 12 of the internees being Protestants).

By July 1922 O/C Woods acknowledged that the Third Northern Division of the IRA was suffering from exhaustion: "The men are in a state of practical starvation and are continually making application for transfer to Dublin to join the 'Regular Army'. Under the present circumstances it would be impossible to keep our Military Organization alive and intact, as the morale of the men is going down day by day and the spirit of the people is practically dead."

== Collapse of Northern IRA and transition to the Free State Army ==
The death of Michael Collins on 22 August 1922 dealt a severe blow to the northern IRA. Collins had taken an active interest in reversing the Partition of Ireland and with his death, many northern IRA men felt that their cause was unwinnable. Roger McCorley stated, "When Collins was killed the northern element [of the IRA] gave up all hope." In August 1922, Woods gave a bleak assessment of the situation in the North of Ireland: "The National Spirit among the people is practically dead at the moment...Without the civil population, our position is hopeless." Woods admitted the IRA had the active support of barely 10% of the Catholic population at that time. On 29 September 1922 Woods wrote a letter to the Commander-in-Chief of the Provisional Government's forces (Richard Mulcahy) in which he asked for clarification on some of the issues faced by his forces in the new state of Northern Ireland. Woods warned that the recognition of the Northern Government by the Irish government would mean that his Officers would not be able to remain in the area and that "The breaking up of this Organisation is the first step to making Partition permanent." At that time the Ulster Special Constabulary increased sectarian attacks on civilians within his Division. Woods reported to the IRAs GHQ:

Orange aggression and cowardly attacks on defenseless people in two of three areas of the division are becoming so serious that we must take active steps for their protection. The only solution is to provide arms in the Cookstown area. While the Volunteers are strong, without arms they are practically defenseless. The position of our people in the district was always bad but since the truce, it is becoming desperate."

In November 1923, Woods was arrested and charged with the murder of W.J. Twaddell. While awaiting trial he was held under brutal conditions on the Prison Ship HMS Argenta in Belfast Lough. The prisoners on the Argenta were often forced to use broken toilets, which overflowed frequently into their communal area. Deprived of tables, the already weakened men ate off the floor, frequently succumbing to disease and illness as a result. There were several hunger strikes by the internees on the Argenta, including a major strike involving upwards of 150 men in the winter of 1923—the 1923 Irish Hunger Strikes.

Although Woods was found innocent of the Twaddell murder charge, he continued to be held on the Argenta until 17 April 1924, the last prisoner to be released. Woods was then served with a prohibition order which excluded him from Northern Ireland. Upon his release, he joined McCorley in the newly formed Free State Army, where Woods served as a Colonel on GHQ Staff and as the Assistant Chief of Staff. Both Woods and McCorley were severe critics of the newly formed Provisional Government's policy towards Northern Ireland. As a result of partition being made permanent and the violence of the Irish Civil War, Woods resigned from the Free State Army in 1926 and made a successful career for himself as a businessman in Dublin.
