= National Graves Association =

Irish republican organization

- Cumann Uaigheann na Laochra Gael ("Grave Committee of Heroes of the Gaels")
- Abbreviation: NGA
- Predecessor: The Monuments Committee (of the Young Ireland Society); The Graves and Monuments Committee
- Formation: 1926; 100 years ago
- Founder: J.W O'Beirne; James Stritch
- Type: Nonprofit
- Purpose: To maintain and restore the graves of people significant to Irish Nationalism and Irish Republicanism
- Location: Dublin, Ireland
- Funding: Voluntary donations
- Website: www.nga.ie

The National Graves Association (NGA; Irish: Cumann Uaigheann na Laochra Gael, "Grave Committee of Heroes of the Gaels") is an Irish organisation which seeks to maintain the graves of Irish republicans who died in the pursuit of a reunified Ireland. Its stated objectives are "to restore, where necessary, and maintain fittingly the graves and memorials of our patriot dead of every generation; to commemorate those who died in the cause of Irish Freedom; to compile a record of such graves and memorials", with a guiding principle that "Only a 32 County Irish Republic represents the true aspiration of those who gave their lives for Irish freedom". It is not affiliated with the Government of Ireland or Government of Northern Ireland. It is also an entirely separate organisation to the National Graves Association, Belfast.

== Policy and history ==
Its 'guiding principle' is "Only a 32 County Irish Republic represents the true aspiration of those who gave their lives for Irish freedom". As a result, it does not look after the graves of British soldiers or Irish soldiers who were on the pro-treaty side in the Irish Civil War. It is an autonomous body, with no affiliation to any political party, organisation, or group.

It was formed in 1926 and has its origins in the many associations established in the late 19th century to erect memorials over the graves of prominent Irish Republican Brotherhood members and others. Since its establishment, the NGA has erected, or accepted into its care, over 500 monuments and memorials throughout Ireland. The NGA also publishes The Last Post, which contains the names of republicans who died in pursuit of republican objectives since 1916. Members of the governing body are not allowed by the rules to be a member of any political party. This rule does not apply to associates.

== Gallery ==
NGA plot for the dead Republican volunteers of the Newry area, St Mary's cemetery

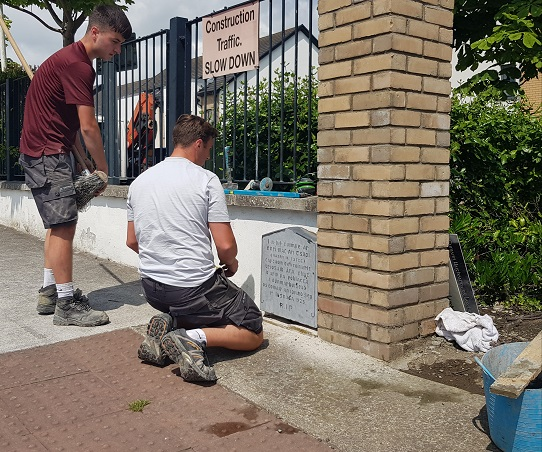
volunteers restoring a commemorative plaque in Finglas, Dublin
