= HMS Al Rawdah =

- HMS Al Rawdah berthed next to U-2502 and U-2326 in 1945.

History

United Kingdom
- Name: HMS Al Rawdah
- Launched: 10 June 1911
- Commissioned: 1941
- Decommissioned: 1946
- Fate: Scrapped, 1953

General characteristics
- Tonnage: 3,549 GRT

HMS Al Rawdah was a ship of the Royal Navy. She was built in 1911 and originally christened Chenab for the Nourse Line of London.

In 1930 the ship was sold to Khedivial Mail Steamship & Graving Dock and renamed Ville De Beyrouth. In 1939 the ship was sold again and renamed Al Rawdah.

In 1940 the British Ministry of Shipping requisitioned the vessel and she was managed by the British-India Steam Navigation Company Ltd. In 1946 Al Rawdah was returned to her owners, and scrapped in 1953.

== Internment ==
Between 1940 and 1946 the vessel (described as a "hulk") was used as a military base and prison ship for Irish Republican internees and prisoners. Internment on the Al Rawdah began in 1939 as it was moored just off Killyleagh in Strangford Lough. Conditions on board the ageing ship were not good - food was described as "abominable" by survivors. Internees were packed in "bronchitic squalor" for months or years. On 18 November 1940 Irish Republican internee Jack Gaffney from Belfast died onboard the Al Rawdah. Before being sent to the Al Rawdah, Gaffney had been beaten and died suddenly, possibly from unhealed injuries. In October 1940 another Irish Republican internee - Sean Dolan from Derry died shortly after being released from the Al Rawdah. Nationalist members of the Northern Ireland Parliament raised the issue of internees being stranded on the ship while German aircraft and ships were attacking Belfast. On 12 February 1941 the last internees were relocated to other jails and they were finally released in August 1945.

In the 1920s another British prison ship (HMS Argenta) was used to house hundreds of internees at Belfast Lough where conditions were described as "unbelievable". Prisoners on the Argenta were packed into cages, often succumbing to disease and routinely suffered beatings from guards.

== See also ==
- HMS Argenta
- HMS Maidstone
