= Irish revolutionary period =

1910s and 1920s in Ireland

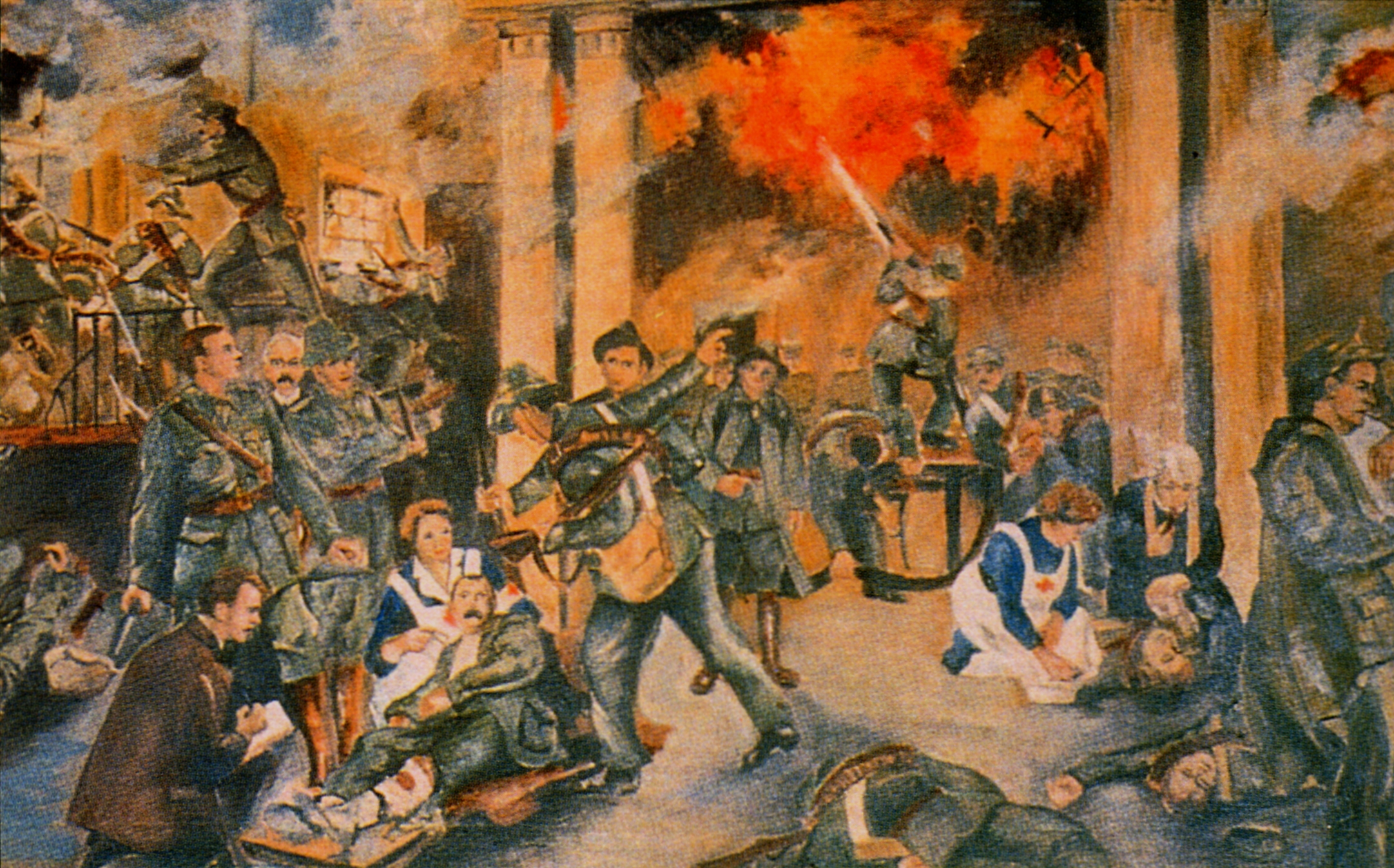
- The Birth of the Irish Republic by Walter Paget
- Date: 1912 to 1923
- Location: Ireland
- Outcome: Partition of Ireland; Anglo-Irish Treaty; establishment of Irish Free State and Northern Ireland

The revolutionary period in Irish history was the period in the 1910s and early 1920s when Irish nationalist opinion shifted from the Home Rule-supporting Irish Parliamentary Party to the independence-supporting Sinn Féin movement. There were several waves of civil unrest linked to Ulster loyalism, trade unionism, and physical force republicanism, leading to the Irish War of Independence, the Partition of Ireland, the creation of the Irish Free State, and the Irish Civil War.

Some modern historians define the revolutionary period as the period from the introduction of the Third Home Rule Bill into Parliament in 1912 to the end of the Civil War in 1923, or sometimes more narrowly as the period from the Easter Rising in 1916 to the end of the War of Independence or the Civil War.

The early years of the Free State, when it was governed by the pro-Treaty party Cumann na nGaedheal, have been described by at least one historian as a counter-revolution. Cumann na nGaedheal minister Kevin O'Higgins said in 1923, "we were probably the most conservative revolutionaries that ever put through a successful revolution".

== Overview ==
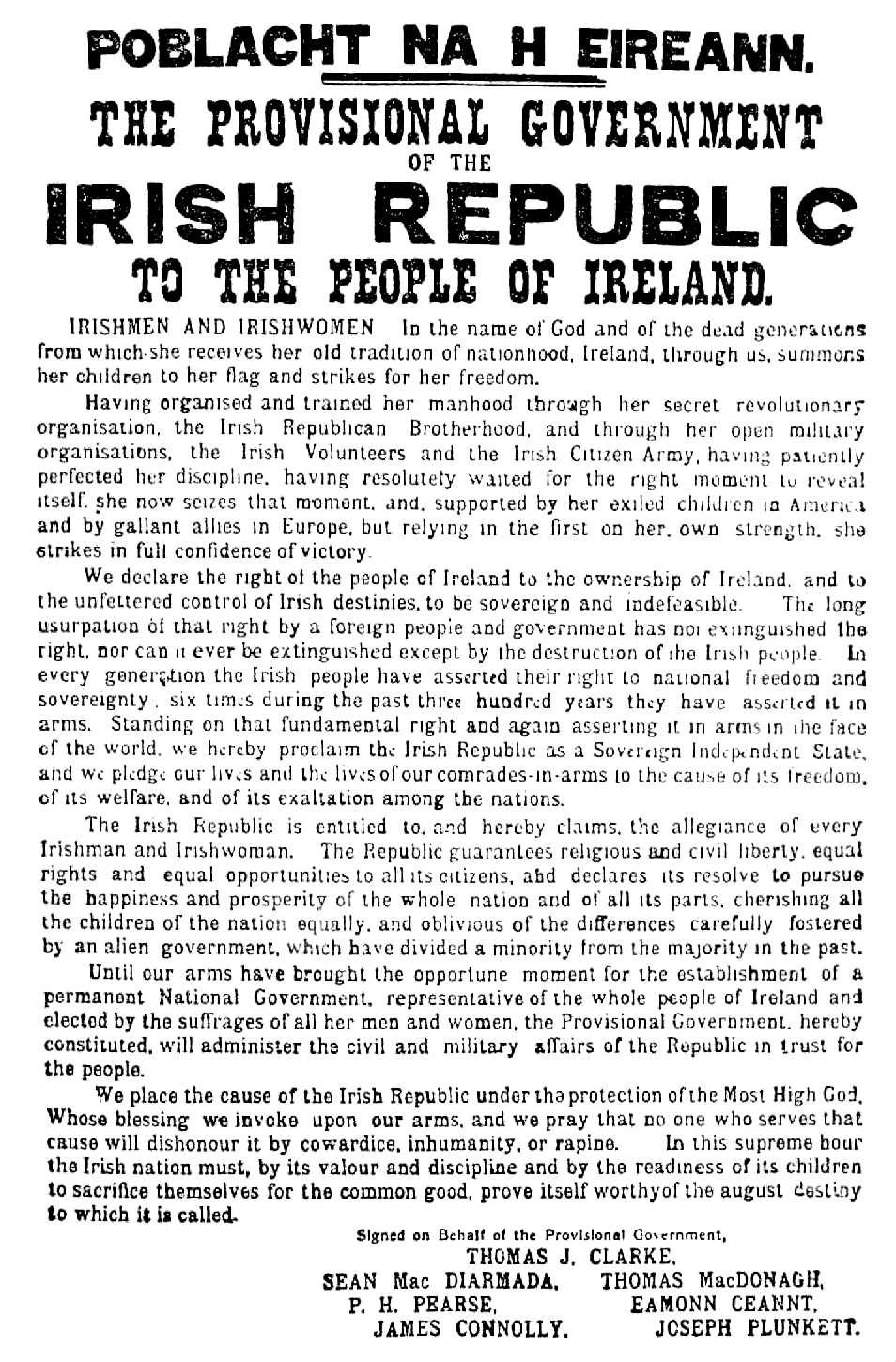
Proclamation of the Irish Republic by the leaders of the Easter Rising

Home Rule seemed certain in 1910 when the Irish Parliamentary Party (IPP) under John Redmond held the balance of power in the British House of Commons. The third Home Rule Bill was introduced in 1912. Unionist resistance was immediate, with the formation of the Ulster Volunteers (UVF); this in turn spurred nationalists to establish their own militant organisation, the Irish Volunteers. The Dublin lock-out in the same year led to creation of the Irish Citizen Army.

In September 1914, two months after the First World War broke out, the UK Parliament passed the Government of Ireland Act 1914, known as the Home Rule Act, to establish self-government for Ireland, but the act was suspended for the duration of the war. Irish nationalist leaders and the IPP under Redmond supported Ireland's participation in the British war effort, in the belief that it would ensure implementation of Home Rule after the war. A core of leaders within the Irish Volunteers were against this decision, but the majority of the men left to form the National Volunteers, some of whom enlisted in Irish regiments of the New British Army, the 10th and 16th (Irish) Divisions, the counterparts of the unionist 36th (Ulster) Division. Before the war ended, Britain made two concerted efforts to implement Home Rule, one in May 1916 and again with the Irish Convention during 1917–1918, but nationalists and unionists were unable to agree to terms for the temporary or permanent exclusion of Ulster from its provisions.

The period 1916–1921 was marked by political violence and upheaval, ending in the partition of Ireland and independence for 26 of its 32 counties. A failed militant attempt by the Irish Volunteers and the Irish Citizen Army was made to gain independence for Ireland with the 1916 Easter Rising, an insurrection in Dublin. Although support for the insurgents was small, the execution of fifteen people by firing squad, the imprisonment or internment of hundreds more, and the imposition of martial law caused a profound shift in public opinion towards the republican cause in Ireland. In addition, the unprecedented threat of Irishmen being conscripted to the British Army in 1918 (for service on the Western Front as a result of the German spring offensive) accelerated this change (see Conscription Crisis of 1918). In the December 1918 elections, Sinn Féin, the party of the rebels, won three-quarters of all seats in Ireland. Twenty-seven of these MPs assembled in Dublin on 21 January 1919 to form a 32-county Irish Republic parliament. The First Dáil Éireann unilaterally declared sovereignty over the island of Ireland.

Unwilling to negotiate any understanding with Britain short of complete independence, the Irish Republican Army, the army of the newly declared Irish Republic, waged a guerrilla war (the Irish War of Independence) from 1919 to 1921. In the course of the fighting and amid much acrimony, the Fourth Government of Ireland Act 1920 implemented Home Rule while separating the island into what the British government's Act termed "Northern Ireland" and "Southern Ireland". In July 1921, the Irish and British governments agreed to a truce that halted the war. In December 1921, representatives of both governments signed the Anglo-Irish Treaty. The Irish delegation was led by Arthur Griffith and Michael Collins. This created the Irish Free State, a self-governing Dominion of the Commonwealth of Nations in the manner of Canada and Australia. Under the Treaty, Northern Ireland could opt out of the Free State and stay within the United Kingdom: it promptly did so. In 1922, both parliaments ratified the Treaty, formalising dominion status for the 26-county Irish Free State (which renamed itself Ireland and claimed sovereignty over the entire island in 1937, and declared itself a republic in 1949), while Northern Ireland, with devolved Parliament, remained part of the United Kingdom.

== Timeline ==
- 1911: Parliament Act 1911 restricts the House of Lords' power to veto Home Rule
- 1912: Third Home Rule Bill introduced at Westminster; Ulster Covenant signed by unionist opponents of Home Rule
- 1913: Dublin lock-out labour dispute
- 1914: Curragh "mutiny" by unionist army officers; First World War breaks out; Third Home Rule Bill enacted but suspended for the duration of the war
- 1915: Patrick Pearse's graveside panegyric at the funeral of Jeremiah O'Donovan Rossa: "Ireland unfree shall never be at peace"
- 1916: Easter Rising by republicans; Battle of the Somme in which Irish soldiers feature prominently, including the mostly unionist 36th (Ulster) Division and nationalist 16th (Irish) Division
- 1917: Irish Convention fails to find a political compromise
- 1918: Conscription Crisis; First World War ends; general election sees Sinn Féin eclipse Irish Parliamentary Party
- 1919: First Dáil proclaims an Irish Republic; Irish Republican Army starts Irish War of Independence (aka "Anglo-Irish War", or "Black and Tan War")
- 1920: Government of Ireland Act 1920 establishes Partition of Ireland into two home rule jurisdictions: unionist-dominated Northern Ireland and the stillborn Southern Ireland
- 1920–1922: The Troubles in Ulster (1920–1922) saw "savage and unprecedented" communal violence between Protestants and Catholics in newly formed Northern Ireland.
- 1921: Ceasefire in War of Independence; Government of Northern Ireland takes office; UK and Dáil governments sign Anglo-Irish Treaty
- 1922: Provisional Government begins administration in what becomes the Irish Free State; Irish Civil War begins between Free State and anti-Treaty republicans
- 1922: Northern IRA offensive
- 1923: Free State wins the Civil War
- 1924: Army Mutiny suppressed
- 1925: Collapse of Irish Boundary Commission means 1920 boundary becomes permanent
- 1926: Fianna Fáil splits from anti-Treaty Sinn Féin
- 1927: Fianna Fáil enters the Dáil after disputably subscribing to the Oath of Allegiance, becoming a "slightly constitutional party".

== Commemoration ==
Separate unionist and nationalist historical narratives exist for the historic events in question; nationalist perspectives are further divided by the Civil War, which ended the revolutionary period. The Northern Ireland peace process, with its promotion of dialogue and reconciliation, has modified this separation. The Bureau of Military History established by the Irish government in 1947 collected oral history accounts from republican veterans of the period 1913 to 1921. Its records were sealed until the last veteran's death in 2003; they were published online in 2012.

In May 2010, the Institute for British Irish Studies in University College Dublin organised a conference on the theme A Decade of Centenaries: Commemorating Our Shared History. Taoiseach Brian Cowen addressed the conference:

This coming decade of commemorations, if well prepared and carefully considered, should enable all of us on this island to complete the journey we have started towards lasting peace and reconciliation. Twelve years have passed since the [Good Friday] Agreement. In the next twelve years we will witness a series of commemorations which will give us pause to reflect on where we have come from, and where we are going. With the centenaries of the Ulster Covenant, the Battle of the Somme, the Easter Rising, the War of Independence, the Government of Ireland Act and the Treaty, the events which led to the political division of this island come up for re-examination. We will also reflect on the crucial roles played by the Labour movement in that defining decade.

He later said, "We believe that mutual respect should be central to all commemorative events and that historical accuracy should be paramount."

The Oireachtas Joint Committee on the Implementation of the Good Friday Agreement discussed commemoration on 13 October 2011, at which Ian Adamson said "The main problem that persists is one of two narratives. There is a Protestant, loyalist narrative and a republican narrative."

On 27 February 2012, the Northern Ireland Assembly passed a motion:

That this Assembly notes the number of centenaries of significant historic events affecting the UK and Ireland in the next 10 years; calls on the Executive to ensure that these are marked in an inclusive manner; and further calls on the First Minister and deputy First Minister, the Minister of Culture, Arts and Leisure and the Minister of Enterprise, Trade and Investment to work together, with the British and Irish Governments, to develop a co-ordinated approach to the commemoration of these important events in our shared history.

An All-Party Oireachtas Consultation Group on Commemorations exists, with an "Expert Advisory Group of eminent historians". In April 2012, the National Commemorative Programme for the Decade of Centenaries, covering centenaries from 1912 to 1922, was announced in the Department of Arts, Heritage and the Gaeltacht under minister Jimmy Deenihan. In June, Deenihan stated that consideration will initially be focused up to 2016, centenary of the Easter Rising.

Hugo Swire told the UK parliament in May 2012 that the Northern Ireland Office was consulting with the Northern Ireland Executive and the Irish government, saying "All these discussions underpin the need to promote tolerance and mutual understanding to ensure that these anniversaries are commemorated with tolerance, dignity and respect for all."

In a debate on the programme in the Seanad in June 2012, Martin McAleese said "It may be more accurate to regard not alone the decade from 1912 to 1922 but rather the 13-year period from 1911 to 1923, as representing the turbulent years that had such a dramatic impact on the course of our island's history. There are approximately 62 events in that period which constitute the package of centenary celebrations, from the arrival of James Connolly in Belfast in 1911 through to the ending of the Civil War in 1923."

A series of conferences, Reflecting on a decade of War and Revolution in Ireland 1912–1923 was organised by Universities Ireland starting in June 2012.

Century Ireland is a website launched in May 2013 to track events as their centenaries pass, using both period documents and modern commentary. It is produced by Boston College's 'Center for Irish Programs', and is funded by the Department of Arts, Heritage and the Gaeltacht and hosted by RTÉ.ie.
