= HMS Argenta =

1919 cargo ship converted to a prison ship

History

United States
- Name: SS Argenta
- Builder: National Shipbuilding Company, Orange, Texas
- Yard number: 245
- Laid down: July 1917
- Launched: May 1919
- In service: 1919
- Out of service: 1921 (cargo)
- Fate: Sold, 1922

United Kingdom (Royal Navy)
- Name: HMS Argenta
- Acquired: 1922
- Out of service: 1925
- Fate: Scrapped 1925

General characteristics
- Type: Cargo ship / prison ship
- Tonnage: 3,500 grt

HMS Argenta was a former American wooden‑hulled cargo steamer, built in Texas in 1917–1919 and later acquired by the British Royal Navy in 1922. Originally launched as SS Argenta, the ship was condemned as unseaworthy soon after entering commercial service and was converted into a prison hulk. During the early 1920s she became a central site of internment in Northern Ireland, holding hundreds of Irish Republicans under the Special Powers Act following the IRA’s 1922 offensive. Moored in Belfast Lough, Argenta gained notoriety for its overcrowded cages, poor sanitation, disease, and repeated hunger strikes. The vessel was taken out of service and scrapped in 1925.

== Construction ==
The two deck steamer was laid down in July 1917 by the National Shipbuilding Company of Orange, Texas as Hull No. 245. Shortages of materials meant that she was wooden-hulled, with a steel keelson, stem and stern posts of oak, and timbers largely of yellow pine. This was due to shortages of metals. SS Argenta was launched in May 1919.

== Cargo ship ==
Argenta's career as a cargo ship was short. As early as November 1919, there were some signs of leakage, and the ship was out of service from late 1921. Condemned and declared unseaworthy in May 1922, she was then sold for use as a prison ship (a prison hulk) by the British Royal Navy.

== Prison ship ==
During the 1920s, the vessel was used by the British government as a military base and prison ship for holding Irish Republicans as part of Britain's internment strategy following the events of Bloody Sunday in 1920. In the spring of 1922 the Irish Republican Army (IRA) launched an offensive in Northern Ireland resulting in the internment of many Irish Republicans on the Argenta.

Dawson Bates, the 1st Northern Ireland Minister for Home Affairs introduced the 1922 Special Powers Act. Internment was introduced and by May 1922 up to 700 Irish Republicans had been arrested. By February 1923, 263 men interned on the Argenta, which was moored in Belfast Lough near Carrickfergus. This location was supplemented with internments at other land based sites, such as Larne workhouse (120 men), Belfast Prison and Derry Gaol. The ship and the workhouses held 542 men without trial at the highest internment population level (June 1923).

Conditions on the Argenta were described as "unbelievable" by Denise Kleinrichert who wrote the hidden history of the 1920s' "floating gulag" in Republican Internment and the Prison Ship Argenta, 1922. Cloistered below decks in cages which each held 50 internees, the prisoners were forced to use broken toilets, which overflowed frequently into their communal area. Deprived of tables, the already weakened men ate off the floor, frequently succumbing to disease and illness as a result. Internees suffered routine beatings from guards and health issues from the conditions on board the ship. Six men were discharged from the ship with medical conditions and two died soon afterwards. There were several hunger strikes, including a major strike involving upwards of 200 men in 1923 (see 1923 Irish hunger strikes).

In November 1923 IRA leader Seamus Woods was arrested and charged with the assassination of W.J. Twaddell, a member of the new Northern Parliament on 22 May 1922, and held on the Argenta. Although Woods was acquitted he continued to be held and was the last prisoner to be released from the ship on 17 April 1924. Woods was then served a prohibition order excluding him from Northern Ireland. Cahir Healy, an Irish politician who campaigned against the inclusion of Counties Tyrone and Fermanagh into Northern Ireland as they had Irish nationalist majorities, spent 18 months on the Argenta, starting in July 1922. Healy is quoted on the reasons for his arrest and internment, "All my life, I have been a man of peace. It is not, therefore, because they feared that I would disturb the peace of Northern Ireland that they dragged me away from my wife and family, but for political reasons. I have been engaged in preparing the case for the inclusion of these areas (Fermanagh and Tyrone) in the Free State. To get me out of the way, local politicians urged my arrest". On 23 November 1923 the majority of prisoners were transferred off the Argenta to another prison - Larne Union.

In 2011 a rare and unusual autograph book from the Argenta, with a large number of signatures of prisoners, almost all with Northern Ireland addresses, mostly late 1922, was auctioned by Mealys Rare Books Limited. Signatures include Mícheál mac Eochaidh, W. Quillan, Packie Murphy, J. P. Kearns, Michael Carraher, Charlie Magee, Peter Rafferty, Mick McIlhatton, Frankie Corr, Owen (Montague) Teague (Patrilineality; County Tyrone, Northern Ireland,) John Grimes, John Campbell, John Bell, Joseph McKenny, Michael O'Neill, Liam Ua Donngaile, Art Mac Partolon (quoting Shakespeare), F.G. Duffy, Jim Rooney, Seosamh O Cianain and Patrick Gormley.

An inscription from the book reads

When you are on some lonely road,
Waiting some friends to see,
Let your thoughts turn towards the Argenta,
And sometimes think of me .. Frankie Corr

As a result of author Denise Kleinrichert's lobbying efforts, the files of all the internees — most of them named in an appendix to her book (pgs 369-374), with many are now available for viewing at the Public Record Office of Northern Ireland (PRONI).

== See also ==
- HMS Al Rawdah (1941)
- HMS Maidstone (1937)
