= Belfast Brigade =

Irish folk song

"Belfast Brigade" is an Irish folk song to the tune of the "Battle Hymn of the Republic".

== Context ==
The song is about the Belfast Brigade of the Irish Republican Army (IRA), and in particular the 1st, or West Belfast battalion, during the Irish War of Independence in the 1920s. Reference is made to James Craig, 1st Viscount Craigavon, the first Prime Minister of Northern Ireland who is accused of sending the 'Specials' or Ulster Special Constabulary, to 'shoot the people down'. This is a reference to the large number of Catholics who were killed by the Special Constabulary in the conflict. In Christy Moore's version, the lyrics in this verse are "the Black and Tans from London came to shoot the people down"

Reference is also made to Seaforde Street in the Short Strand area of east Belfast, which was often the scene of armed encounters between the IRA, British forces and loyalist gunmen. Alternative versions of the song contain a reference to the Falls Road area instead of Seaforde Street. Other lyrics specific to the 1920s are references to armoured cars and Crossley Tenders armoured trucks which were used by the Northern Ireland Security forces at the time. The British use of such heavy weaponry is contrasted with the poor arms possessed by the IRA, who are nevertheless, 'ready to defend ourselves no matter where we go'. The song includes the original war cry of the Belfast Brigade, "No surrender! Is the war cry of the Belfast Brigade."

In some versions of the song, there is an allusion to the politics of the Irish Civil War of 1922-1923, 'We're out for our Republic and to hell with your Free State'. The Belfast Brigade in fact largely supported Michael Collins during the civil war, although many of them changed their opinion when it became clear that the Partition of Ireland would be permanent. In other versions of the song, this internal Republican disagreement is not mentioned, the words being changed to, 'Orangemen may live in dread'.

During the Spanish Civil War (1936–1939), the Connolly Column, an Irish volunteer unit of the 15th International Brigade, sang the song while fighting against Francisco Franco's nationalists.

In the 1970s, with the onset of The Troubles, another version of the song emerged about the Provisional IRA Belfast Brigade. The lyrics were changed to 'the British Army came to Belfast to shoot the people down...'
