= Roger McCorley =

Irish republican (1901 – 1993)

Roger McCorley (6 September 1901 – 13 November 1993) was an Irish republican activist.

== Early life ==
Roger Edmund McCorley was born into a Roman Catholic family at 67 Hillman Street in Belfast on 6 September 1901, one of three children born to Roger Edmund McCorley, a meat carver in a hotel, and Agnes Liggett; he had two elder brothers, Vincent and Felix. He joined the Fianna Éireann (an Irish nationalist youth organisation) in his teens. His family had a very strong republican tradition and he claimed to be the great-grandson of the United Irishmen folk hero Roddy McCorley, who was executed for his part in the 1798 rebellion.

== Joins the IRA ==
McCorley was a member of the Belfast Brigade of the Irish Republican Army (IRA) during the Irish War of Independence, 1919–1922. He was commandant of the Brigade's first battalion, eventually becoming Commandant of the Belfast Brigade. During this time McCorley's brother Felix was Adjutant and Training Officer of the IRA's Antrim Brigade and served in Liverpool, England. In June 1920, Roger McCorley was involved in an attack on a Royal Irish Constabulary (RIC) police barracks at Crossgar, County Down. On Sunday 22 August 1920, in Lisburn, McCorley was involved in the assassination of RIC District Inspector Oswald Swanzy who was held responsible (by the Irish leader Michael Collins) for the assassination of Tomas McCurtain, the Lord Mayor of Cork.

McCorley was noted for his militancy, as he was in favour of armed attacks on British forces in Belfast. The Brigade's leaders, by contrast, in particular, Joe McKelvey, were wary of sanctioning attacks for fear of loyalist reprisals on republicans and the Catholic population in general. In addition, McCorley was in favour of conducting an armed defence of Catholic areas, whereas McKelvey did not want the IRA to get involved in what he considered to be sectarian violence. McCorley wrote later that in the end, 'the issue settled itself within a very short space of time, when the Orange mob was given uniforms, paid for by the British, and called the Ulster Special Constabulary' (USC). The role of the USC (a temporary police force raised for counter-insurgency purposes) in the conflict is still debated, but republicans maintain that the organisation was responsible for the indiscriminate killings of Catholics and nationalists.

== The Active Service Unit ==
On 26 January 1921, McCorley, was involved in the fatal shooting of three Auxiliary Division officers in their beds in the Railway View hotel in central Belfast. Shortly afterwards, McCorley and another IRA man, Seamus Woods, organised an Active Service Unit (ASU) within the first battalion of the Belfast Brigade, with the intention of carrying out attacks, with or without the approval of the Brigade leadership. The unit consisted of 32 men. McCorley later wrote, 'I issued a general order that, where reprisal gangs [State forces] were cornered, no prisoners were to be taken'. In March 1921, McCorley personally led the ASU in the killing of three Black and Tans in Victoria Street in central Belfast. He was responsible for the deaths of two more Auxiliaries in Donegall Place in April. In reprisal for these shootings, members of the RIC assassinated two republican activists, the Duffin brothers in Clonard Gardens in west Belfast. On 10 June 1921 Woods and McCorley units were involved in the killing of an RIC man who was suspected in the revenge killings of the Duffin brothers (see 23 April 1921 Timeline of the Irish War of Independence). Two RIC men and a civilian were also wounded in that attack.

Thereafter, there was what historian Robert Lynch has described as a 'savage underground war' between McCorley's ASU and RIC personnel based in Springfield Road barracks and led by an Inspector Ferris. Ferris had also been accused of involvement in the murder of the Lord Mayor of Cork Thomas MacCurtain and had been posted to Lisburn for his safety. During this period of violence, Ferris himself was among the casualties, being shot in the chest and neck, but surviving. McCorley claimed to have been one of the four IRA men who shot Ferris. In addition, McCorley's men bombed and burned a number of businesses including several cinemas and a Reform Club. In May 1921, however, 13 of McCorley's best men were arrested when surrounded by British troops during an operation in county Cavan. They were held in Crumlin Road jail and sentenced to death.

On 3 June, McCorley organised an attack on Crumlin Road jail in an attempt to rescue the IRA men held there before they were executed. The operation was not a success, however the condemned men were reprieved after a truce was agreed between the IRA and British forces in July 1921. On Bloody Sunday (10 July 1921) McCorley was a major leader in the defence of nationalist areas from attacks by both the police and loyalists. On that day twenty people were killed. This was despite a nationwide truce that had been agreed between British and Irish leaders, due to come into effect at noon on 11 July. McCorley himself liaised with the RIC to try to ensure the truce held in Belfast but noted later that in Belfast 'the truce lasted six hours only'. At least 100 people were wounded, about 200 houses were destroyed or badly damaged – most of them Catholic homes, leaving 1,000 people homeless. (see: The Troubles in Ulster (1920–1922)).

== Belfast Brigade & 3rd Northern Division leader ==
In April 1922, McCorley became leader of the IRA Belfast Brigade after Joe McKelvey went south to Dublin to join other IRA members who were fighting against the Anglo-Irish Treaty. With McKelvey's departure Seamus Woods became Officer Commanding of the IRA's 3rd Northern Division (which had up to 1,000 members) with McCorley designated as Vice Officer Commanding during an intense period of intercommunal violence. McCorley for his part, supported the Treaty, despite the fact that it provided for the partition of Ireland and the continued British rule in Northern Ireland. The reason for this was that Michael Collins and Eoin O'Duffy had assured him that this was only a tactical move and indeed, Collins sent men, money and weapons to the IRA in the North throughout 1922.

In May 1922, the IRA launched an offensive with attacks all across Northern Ireland. On 18 May 1922 in Belfast, McCorley and Woods men carried out an assault on Musgrave Street RIC barracks in which they captured the files and military plans of the police headquarters. He also conducted an arson campaign on businesses in Belfast. His men also carried out a number of assassinations, including that of Unionist MP William Twaddell, which caused the internment of over 200 Belfast IRA men. McCorley's command saw the collapse of the Belfast IRA.

== Civil War ==
To escape from the subsequent repression, McCorley and over 900 Northern IRA men fled south, to the Irish Free State, where they were housed in the Curragh. McCorley was put in command of these men. In June 1922, the Irish Civil War broke out between Pro and Anti-Treaty elements of the IRA. McCorley took the side of the Free State and Michael Collins. After Michael Collins was killed in August 1922, McCorley's men were stood down. About 300 of them joined the National Army and were sent to County Kerry to put down anti-Treaty guerrillas there. In the spring of 1923, McCorley, bitterly disillusioned by the brutal counter-insurgency against fellow republicans, resigned his command. He recalled he was, 'fed up', with the civil war.

He later asserted that he 'hated the Treaty' and only supported it because it allowed Ireland to have its own armed forces. Both McCorley and Seamus Woods were severe critics of the Irish Free State inertia towards Northern Ireland after the death of Michael Collins. McCorley commented that when Collins was killed "the Northern element gave up all hope."

In 1936 he was instrumental in the establishment of the All-Ireland Old IRA Men's Organization, serving as vice-president with President Liam Deasy (Cork No. 3 Brigade) and Secretary George Lennon (Waterford No. 2 Brigade).

== Coras na Poblachta ==
In the 1940s, McCorley was a founding member of Córas na Poblachta, a political party which aspired to a United Ireland and economic independence from Britain. He died on 13 November 1993 and is buried in the Republican Plot of Glasnevin cemetery.
