= Ulster Imperial Guards =

The Ulster Imperial Guards were a short-lived loyalist paramilitary group organised in Belfast in November 1921 to prevent Northern Ireland being included in an independent Irish Free State. Newspaper reports suggested it consisted mainly of ex-servicemen, of whom 21,000 men were recruited in ten battalions.

Led by Robert Boyd and William Twaddell, the Ulster Imperial Guards outnumbered the attempt to revive the Ulster Volunteer Force and held an armoury of former UVF guns in Tamar Street in East Belfast. The demise of the organisation in 1922 may have been due to a combination of the partition arrangements in the Anglo-Irish Treaty, Twaddell's assassination, and the recruitment of some of its members into the Ulster Special Constabulary.
