= HM Prison Belfast =

Former prison in Belfast, Northern Ireland

Coordinates: 54.609°N 5.942°W

Her Majesty's Prison Belfast
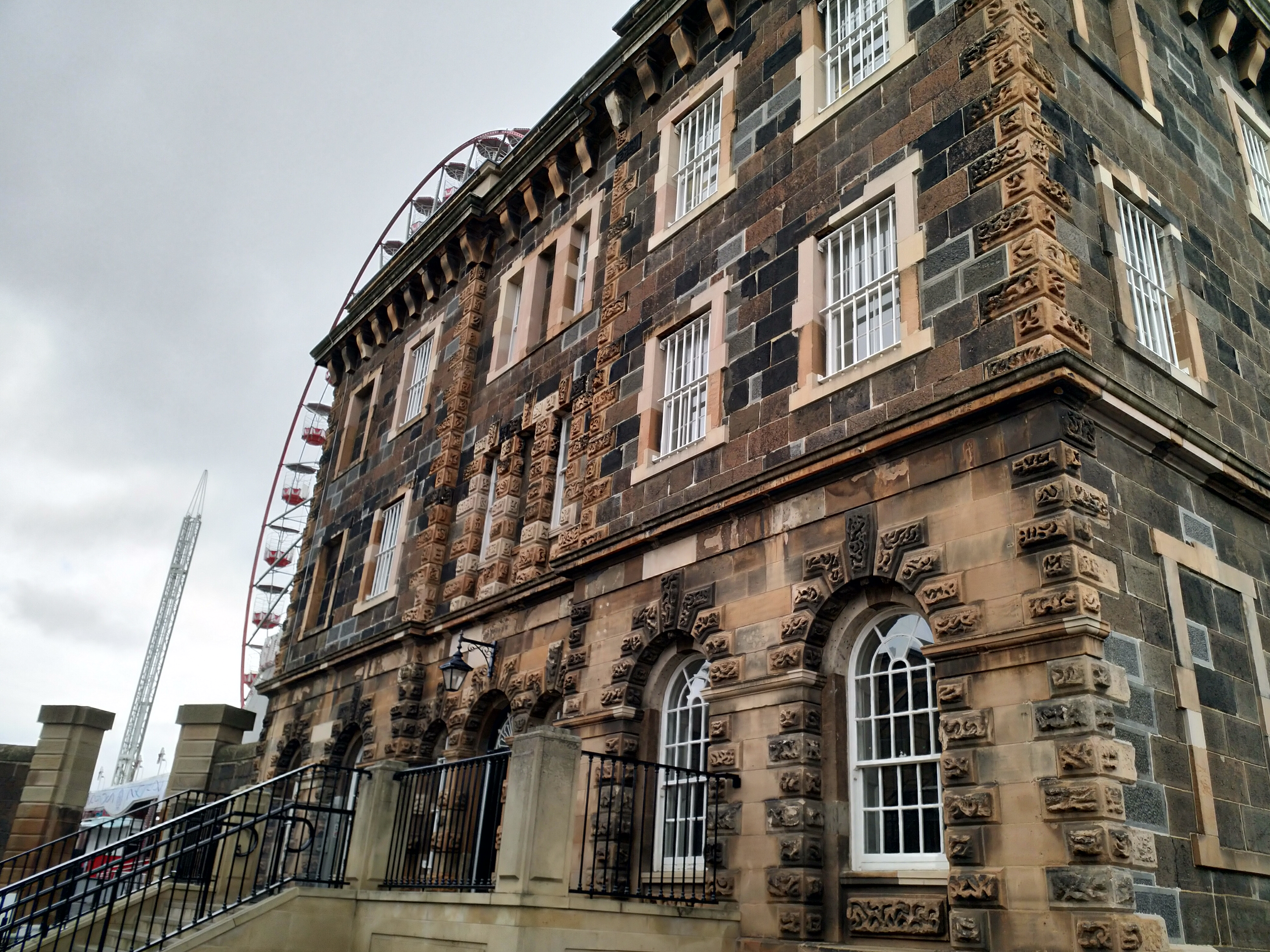
- Interactive map of Her Majesty's Prison Belfast
- Location: Belfast, Northern Ireland
- Status: Museum
- Security class: High
- Capacity: Variable
- Opened: 1846
- Closed: 31 March 1996
- Website: crumlinroadgaol.com

HM Prison Belfast, also known as Crumlin Road Gaol, is a former prison situated on the Crumlin Road in north Belfast, Northern Ireland. Since 1996 it is the only remaining Victorian era former prison in Northern Ireland. It is colloquially known as the Crum.

The Northern Ireland Environment Agency has given it a grade A listed building status because of its architectural and historical significance. The Crumlin Road Courthouse, derelict since its closure, stands opposite the Gaol with a tunnel under the main road connecting the two buildings and used previously to transport the prisoners between the two buildings.

== Construction ==
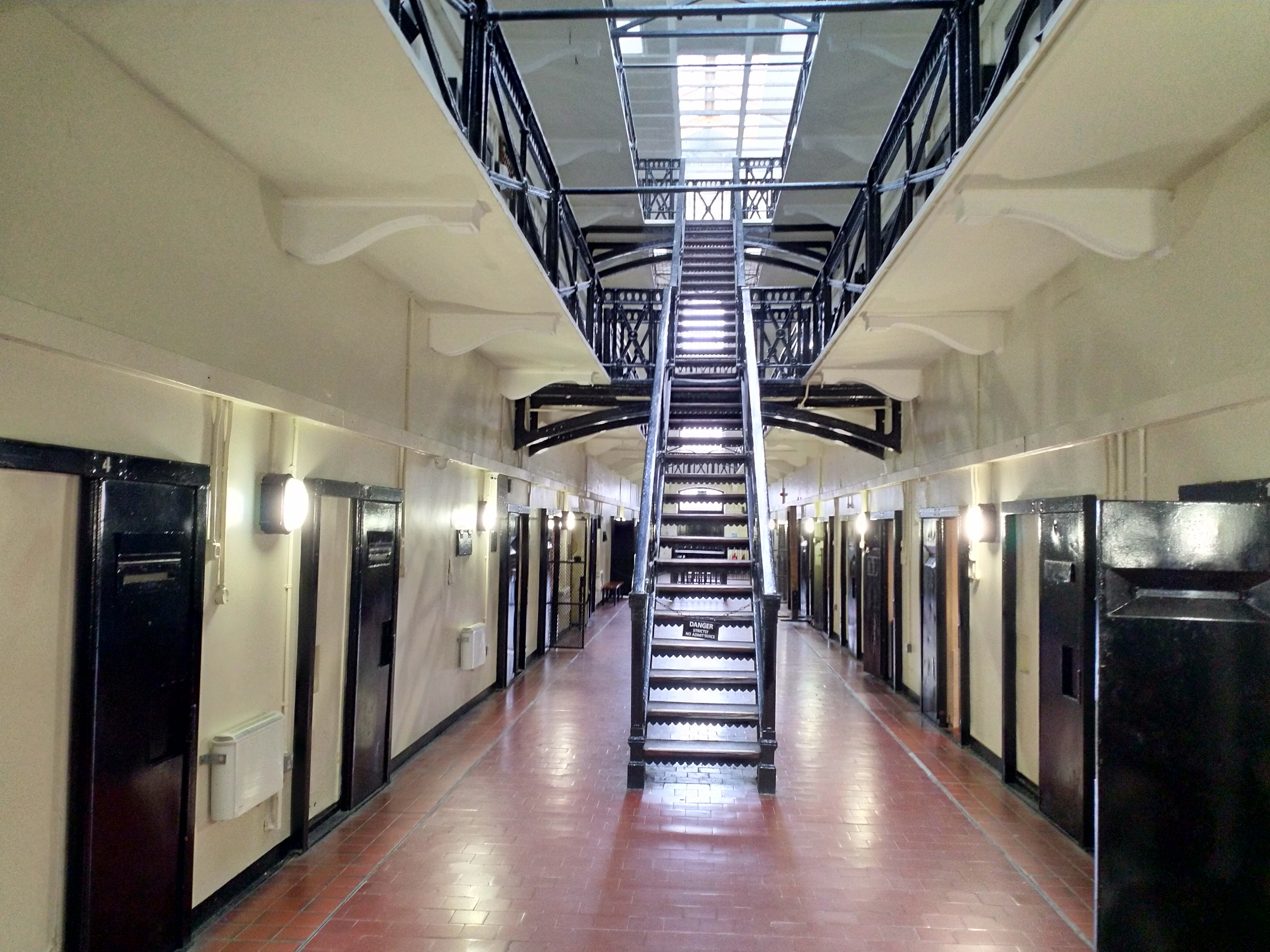
Crumlin Road Gaol interior view

Designed by Sir Charles Lanyon, the prison was built between 1843 and 1845 and cost £60,000. Built as a replacement for the County Gaol on Antrim Street in Carrickfergus, and known as the County Gaol for Antrim, it was constructed of black basalt rock on ten acres at the bottom of the Crumlin Road. Partly based on HM Prison Pentonville, it was one of the most advanced prisons of its day. Built within a five-sided wall, the four wings are up to four storeys in height and fan off from the central area which was known as The Circle. The prison was originally built to hold between 500 and 550 prisoners in cells that measured 12 × 7 feet, (365 cm x 213 cm) It was the first prison in Northern Ireland to be built according to "The Separate System", intended to separate prisoners from each other with no communication between them.

== Operation ==
The first 106 inmates, who were forced to walk from Carrickfergus Prison in chains, arrived in 1846. These inmates, who were men, women and children, completed the changeover of the two prisons. Children from impoverished working-class families were often imprisoned at the gaol in the early years for offences such as stealing food or clothing. Thirteen-year-old Patrick Magee, who had been sentenced to three months in prison, hanged himself in his cell in 1858.

Women inmates were kept in the prison block house until the early 1900s. Ulster suffragettes, among them Dorothy Evans and Madge Muir, were imprisoned in the gaol during 1914.

When originally designed by Lanyon, the prison did not contain a gallows and the executions were carried out in public view until 1901, when an execution chamber was constructed within the prison walls and used until the last of the hangings in 1961. Seventeen prisoners were executed in the prison, the last being Robert McGladdery who was hanged in 1961 for the murder of Pearl Gamble. The condemned would live in a cell, large enough for two guards to live in as well. The bodies of the executed were buried inside the prison in unconsecrated ground, against the back wall beside the prison hospital. The execution of Tom Williams, a nineteen-year-old member of the IRA, took place on 2 September 1942; he was hanged for the slaying of an RUC officer. The hangman in charge was Thomas Pierrepoint, the gaol's most regular hangman, who carried out six executions in the gaol between 1928 and 1942. Williams was one of two executed prisoners whose remains were disinterred and buried elsewhere.

Especially in the early 1970s, as many as three prisoners were placed in each cell. In October 1971 members of the International Red Cross were allowed to inspect the prison/internment center along with Long Kesh Detention Centre. The Red Cross inspectors found 864 prisoners/internees in a building intended to house 475 persons.

Despite being known as Europe's Alcatraz, there were a number of successful escape attempts at the Gaol with the first being recorded in 1866. In May 1941, five Irish Republican prisoners made their escape over the wall to freedom. During the Troubles of the 1970s Martin Meehan and several other members of the Irish Republican Army made successful escapes from Crumlin Road.

During its 150-year history the gaol had many prisoners pass through its doors. Some of the more well known prisoners included Éamon de Valera, Dáithí Ó Conaill, Martin McGuinness, Michael Stone, Ian Paisley, and Bobby Sands.

On 24 November 1991, the Loyalist wing of the prison became the target of a Provisional IRA bomb that killed a UVF and a UDA prisoner.

== Post prison history ==
The gaol closed its doors as a prison in 1996 and it was empty for many years. A restoration project was announced in August 2010. In November 2012, the prison opened as a tourist attraction and conference centre and now hosts concerts. The museum welcomed a visit by Queen Elizabeth II in 2014.

In 2024 McConnell's Distillery and Visitor Experience was opened in a wing of the old gaol.

The gaol has a reputation for being a paranormally active location and run their own guided ghost walks and paranormal investigations. The grounds played host to the 2020 UK's Strongest Man competition while the prison was used as a location for the third series of the BBC children's TV series The Sparticle Mystery.
