= Reginald Lyons =

Irish cricketer (1922–1976)

Personal information
- Full name: Reginald William Lyons
- Born: 12 July 1922; Dublin, Leinster, Ireland
- Died: 12 September 1976 (aged 54); Worthing, Sussex, England
- Batting: Right-handed
- Role: Wicket-keeper

Domestic team information
- Years: Team
- 1947: Ireland

Career statistics
Competition	First-class
Matches	1
Runs scored	0
Batting average	–
100s/50s	–/–
Top score	0*
Catches/stumpings	0/4
- Source: Cricinfo, 8 February 2019

Reginald William Lyons (12 July 1922 in Dublin, Ireland – 12 September 1976 in Worthing, Sussex, England) was an Irish cricketer. A right-handed batsman and wicket-keeper, he played just once for the Ireland cricket team, a first-class match against Scotland in May 1947.
