= Charles Wickham (police officer) =

British Army officer

Lieutenant-Colonel Sir Charles George Wickham, KCMG, KBE, DSO (11 September 1879 – 20 July 1971) was a British Army officer, commander of the Royal Ulster Constabulary (1922–1945) and adviser to British police in various colonies of the Empire.

Wickham was born in 1879. He was commissioned as a second lieutenant in the Norfolk Regiment on 12 August 1899, and fought with the Mounted Infantry in the Second Boer War 1899–1902. During the war, he was slightly wounded, mentioned in despatches, promoted to Lieutenant on 28 August 1900, and appointed a Companion of the Distinguished Service Order (DSO) for his service. Shortly before the end of hostilities in June 1902, Wickham had in April been appointed a staff officer for intelligence. He stayed in South Africa until January 1903, when 417 officers and men of the 2nd Battalion Norfolk Regiment left Cape Town for home.

He later took part in a British Expeditionary Force sent to aid the White movement in the Russian Civil War. In 1919 he was sent to Ireland and upon formation of the Royal Ulster Constabulary in 1922 he was appointed its first Inspector General, a position he held until 1945. In 1945 he was sent to Greece where he was in charge of training the Greek police until 1952. In late 1946 he was invited on the initiative of Sir Alan Cunningham to investigate the Palestine Police Force and he submitted his report in the beginning of December 1946.
