= Liam Deasy =

Irish Republican Army officer (1896–1974)

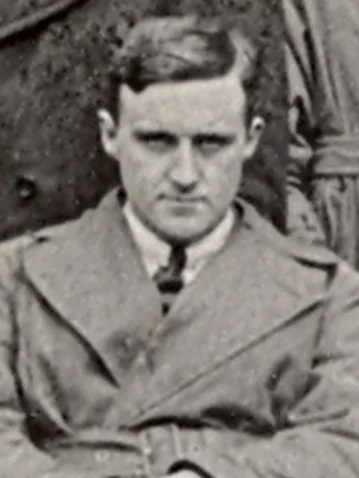
- Deasy in 1922
- Born: 6 May 1896; Kilmacsimon, County Cork
- Died: 20 August 1974 (aged 78); Dublin, Ireland
- Spouse: Margaret O'Donoghue (m. 1927)
- Children: 3
- Military career
- Allegiance: Irish Republic; Ireland
- Branch: Irish Republican Army; Anti-Treaty IRA; Irish Army
- Rank: Commandant General
- Conflicts: Irish War of Independence; Tooreen ambush; Crossbarry ambush; Irish Civil War; Battle of Kilmallock
- Other work: Textile manufacturer

Liam Deasy (6 May 1896 – 20 August 1974) was an Irish Republican Army officer who fought in the Irish War of Independence and the Irish Civil War. In the latter conflict, he was second-in-command of the anti-treaty forces for a period in late 1922 and early 1923. Before the anti-treaty and pro-treaty split, he was considered closely associated with Michael Collins.

== Early life ==
Deasy was born in Kilmacsimon, Bandon, County Cork on 6 May 1896 and educated in the local school at Ballinadee. He was the third son of William and Mary Deasy.

== Irish War of Independence ==
In the War of Independence (1919–21, Deasy was adjutant of the 3rd Cork Brigade (West Cork).

Deasy served under Tom Barry in one of the unit's best known action, the Crossbarry Ambush in March 1921. His younger brother, Pat, died in action at the Kilmichael Ambush in November 1920, an engagement at which Liam Deasy was not present.

Deasy also took part in the Tooreen ambush.

== Civil War ==
Deasy opposed the Anglo-Irish Treaty. In the months that followed, he tried to persuade Colins to renegotiate aspects of the treaty, especially to remove an oath to the British king from the constitution of the new Irish Free State. When fighting broke out in Dublin in June 1922, between pro and anti-Treaty forces, Deasy sided with the Anti-Treaty IRA in the ensuing Irish Civil War. However, he was reluctant to fight his former comrades and voiced the opinion that the fighting should have ended with the Free State seizure of the Four Courts.

In late July, Deasy commanded 1,500 anti-treaty fighters who held a line around Kilmallock south of Limerick city against about 2,000 Free State troops under Eoin O'Duffy. Deasy's men were the most experienced IRA fighters of the 1919-21 war and held their position until 8 August, when they were outflanked by seaborne landings on the southern coast. Deasy's men then dispersed. He went on the run in the south-east of the country.

In August 1922, Deasy was in command of a band of republican guerrillas in West Cork, when they heard that Collins was in the area. Deasy had his men prepare an ambush for Collins' convoy at Béal na Bláth, should it return by the same route it had taken earlier.

Deasy and most of his men did not take part in the ambush as they had retired to a nearby pub, assuming that they had missed Collins. However, Collins arrived as the last of Deasy's men were clearing the mine and barricade that had been erected on the road at Béal na Bláth. Collins was killed in the ensuing firefight. Deasy later wrote in his memoirs that he profoundly regretted the death of his former commander.

== Capture and surrender ==
In January 1923, by which time he had become Deputy Chief of Staff of the IRA, Deasy was captured by Free State forces near Clonmel and sentenced to death. Deasy was aware that the newly formed government planned on wholesale executions and knew that the IRA would retaliate with reprisals. Deasy had decided that it was now time to end the war. He signed a document (written by his captors) ordering the men under his command to surrender themselves and their arms to the government. He was spared execution, see: Executions -Irish Civil War. On the day that his order was published Free State authorities demanded that the prisoners in a jail in Limerick sign a statement agreeing to unconditional surrender, threatening wholescale executions to those who refused. Some Republicans denounced him as a traitor and a coward for this action, but Deasy argued in his book, Brother against Brother that he was opposed to continuing the civil war anyway and would have called on republicans to surrender whether or not he had been captured.

== Later life ==
Deasy took no further part in politics following the end of the civil war. In 1924, he set up a business making weatherproof textiles. On 24 November 1927, Deasy married Margaret Mary O'Donoghue; the two would have three daughters together.

During The Emergency, Deasy served in the Irish Army from 1940 to 1945, reaching the rank of commandant. Deasy later wrote two memoirs about his experiences during the revolutionary period: Toward Ireland Free and Brother against Brother, the latter being published after his death.

Deasy died at St. Anne's Hospital in Dublin on 20 August 1974.

== Sources ==
- Liam Deasy: Brother against Brother. Cork: Mercier Press, 1982; reissued 1998.
- Edward Purdon: The Irish Civil War 1922-1923. Cork: Mercier Press, 2000.
- Ernie O'Malley: The Men Will Talk to Me, West Cork Interviews, Cork: Mercier Press, 2015.
