= Charlie Hurley (Irish republican) =

Irish republican (1893–1921)

Charles Hurley
- Born: Charles Hurley; 19 March 1893; Baurleigh, County Cork, Ireland
- Died: 19 March 1921 (aged 28); County Cork, Ireland
- Military career
- Allegiance: Ireland
- Branch: Irish Republican Army
- Unit: 3rd Cork Brigade
- Conflicts: Irish War of Independence

Charles Hurley (Irish: Cathal Ó Muirthile; 19 March 1893 – 19 March 1921) was Officer Commanding of the 3rd Cork Brigade (West Cork) of the Irish Republican Army during the Irish War of Independence (1919–1921).

== Early life ==
He was born in Baurleigh, County Cork, near the village of Kilbrittain on 19 March 1893 and was educated in national school and subsequently passed the civil service examinations at aged fifteen. According to his brother James, Charlie was one of seven siblings, 'born and reared in a farm of 35 acres'.

In his adolescence, he became a clerk working for the government. In 1915, he was offered a promotion and a transfer to Haulbowline Island, but declined on the grounds that this entailed enlisting in the Royal Navy, albeit in a purely administrative role. Returning to Cork, he became friends with Liam Deasy who introduced him to the Irish republican movement. In 1917, he took a job at Castletownbere and it is there that he joined the Irish Volunteers in 1917. He was also a member of Sinn Féin, the Gaelic Athletic Association and the Gaelic League.

== IRA commander ==
In 1918, he was sentenced to five years penal servitude for possession of arms and plans of the British military fortifications at Bere Island. However, he was released in 1919 after a hunger strike. In the same year, his brother Willie, also an IRA Volunteer, died of typhoid. He first became vice-commandant of the Volunteers or IRA Bandon Battalion and then in August 1920, after the arrest and imprisonment of Tom Hales, he became commander of the Third Cork Brigade of the IRA. One of his most important decisions was to establish a full-time guerrilla unit or flying column, under Tom Barry.

The 3rd Cork Brigade (also known as the West Cork Brigade) went on to be one of the most active IRA units during the guerrilla war against the British in 1919–1921. According to Barry, Hurley led an ambush of the Royal Irish Constabulary at Ahawadda, in April 1920 killing three policemen, wounding one and taking their arms and ammunition. In July of that year, Hurley led a successful attack on Coastguard station at Howes Strand, capturing a large amount of weapons and ammunition. Barry remarked that Hurley was "a remarkable man and a lovable personality' and 'continually urged a fighting army policy."

Hurley was present at the Tooreen ambush in October 1920 and subsequently was part of an assassination attempt on a judge who gave 'harsh sentences' to IRA members. From December 1920 until January 1921, Hurley took command of the Third Cork Brigade's flying column while Barry was ill. He also toured IRA units to assess the impact of the Catholic Bishop of Cork, Dr. Colohan's decree of excommunication on the guerrilla movement.

== Death and memory ==
In February 1921, he led the disastrous Upton Train Ambush on 15 February 1921, an attack on train carrying British troops. In the action, the attacking IRA party was heavily outnumbered and the fire fight resulted in three IRA men and six civilians being killed. Hurley was also badly wounded in the face and ankle. Tom Barry wrote of the aftermath of the ambush that: "he (Hurley) mourned deeply for his dead comrades and for the dead civilians, whom he did not know."

Hurley was killed in action by British troops just before the Crossbarry Ambush on 19 March 1921. Hurley was staying in a house with a pro-republican family, where he was recuperating from the serious wounds he had received at Upton a month earlier. When he realised that he was surrounded by the British forces he fled the house, as Tom Barry comments in his book, to reduce the danger to those in the house, and was shot dead by pursuing troops. Barry remarks that Hurley, "died in the manner in which we expected."

The British Army placed his body at the workhouse in Bandon but members of Cumann na mBan surreptitiously took away his body and he was given a secret republican funeral in Clogagh.(5) A local ballad exists that commemorates him. In addition, the Gaelic Athletic Association grounds in Bandon was named after him in 1971.

== See also ==
- Liam Deasy
- Ted O'Sullivan
- Seán Hales
