= Cosse =

Cosse or Cossé may refer to:

- Cossé-d'Anjou, France
- Cossé-le-Vivien, France

People named Cosse or Cossé include:

- Airbertach mac Cosse, Irish poet
- Carolina Cosse, Uruguayan engineer
- Emmanuelle Cosse, French politician
- Jürgen Coße (born 1969), German politician
- Laurence Cossé, French writer
- Villanueva Cosse (born 1933), Uruguayan actor, theater director, and writer
- Duke of Brissac

Cosse may also refer to:

- Kosse (Königsberg), Prussia
