= Upton train ambush =

Failed IRA attack on the British Army

- Part of the Irish War of Independence
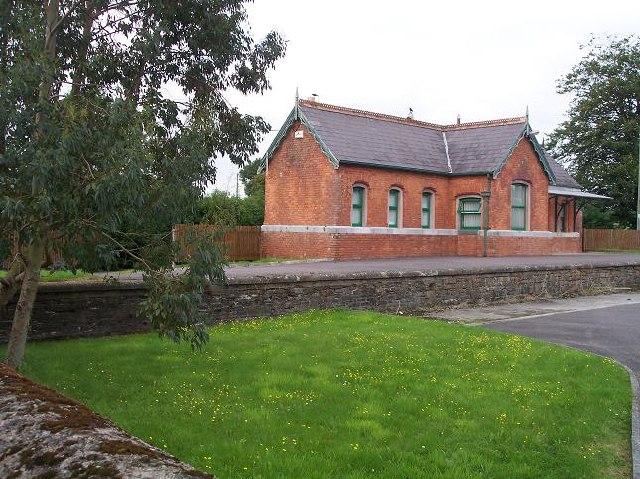
- The disused station in 2005
Date	15 February 1921
Location	Upton, County Cork, Ireland 51.788°N 8.673°W
Result	British victory

Belligerents
United Kingdom	Irish Republican Army (3rd Cork Brigade)

Commanders and leaders
	Charlie Hurley (WIA)

Strength
50 soldiers	13 volunteers

Casualties and losses
6 wounded	3 killed 2 wounded
- 8 civilians killed in crossfire, 10 wounded
- Location within island of Ireland

The Upton train ambush took place on 15 February 1921, during the Irish War of Independence. The Irish Republican Army (IRA) mounted an attack on a train carrying British soldiers at Upton, County Cork. The action was a disaster for the IRA; three of its volunteers were killed, two wounded and one captured. Six British soldiers were wounded, three seriously. At least eight civilian passengers were killed and ten wounded in the crossfire.

== Background ==
According to a study of the region, Cork was "by far the most violent county in Ireland" during the War of Independence and had several active guerrilla brigades. Of these, the Third (west Cork) was one of the most effective and it was a unit from this Brigade that carried out the Upton ambush.

Up until the end of 1920, the British had been unable to move troops by train, due to a nationwide boycott by railway workers of trains carrying the British military. However, this strike was lifted in December 1920. While this helped the British military's mobility, it also gave the IRA a new target: trains carrying soldiers. A week before the Upton ambush, the local IRA had made a successful attack on a train travelling from Killarney to Millstreet near Drishanbeg, killing one sergeant and wounding five more soldiers.

== Ambush ==
Five days after the Drishanbeg ambush, plans were made for an attack at Upton and Innishannon railway station on a train travelling between Cork city and Bandon. The ambushers, led by Charlie Hurley, were 13 strong; 7 armed with rifles and the remainder with revolvers or semi-automatic pistols. They took up position at the station ten minutes before the train pulled in, imprisoning the station master, clearing the station of civilians and taking cover behind sacks of grain and flour taken from a store.

The train was carrying around 500 British soldiers of the Essex Regiment, who were mingled with civilian passengers throughout the train's carriages. The IRA party was therefore quite heavily outnumbered and out-gunned, but were unaware of this, as two IRA scouts, who were supposed to have been on the train and signalled to them the British numbers, never turned up. During the previous ten days the British troops all travelled in one carriage but on this day they were dispersed in multiple carriages. Instead about 50 soldiers boarded the train further down than usual at Kinsale and mixed in with civilians. One IRA man observed this and cycled to Upton to inform Hurley however he arrived 2 minutes after the shooting had started. As a result, when the IRA opened fire on the train, there were heavy civilian casualties; including two commercial travellers killed by the first volley. The New York Times reported that "a shower of bullets was rained on the train, practically every compartment being swept".

The firefight lasted for only ten minutes, but in that time eight civilian passengers were killed and ten wounded. Six British soldiers were injured, three of them seriously. Two IRA volunteers were killed outright and another was fatally wounded; two more were badly wounded but survived. Charlie Hurley, who had led the ambush, was struck in the face by a bullet. IRA leader Tom Barry later wrote, "Through some miracle, the nine unwounded and two wounded got away across country, in small parties, with the British following close behind". Three civilian passengers, one unwounded and two wounded, were detained by the British on suspicion of belonging to the ambush party.

On the IRA side Lieutenant Patrick O'Sullivan, Lieutenant John Phelan, and Section Commander Falvey were killed while Lieutenant Daniel O'Mahoney was seriously wounded but survived.

== Aftermath ==
The Upton ambush was part of what Tom Barry described as "twelve dark days" for the 3rd Cork Brigade of the IRA. Between 4 February and 16 February, eleven members of the Brigade were killed. Hurley was shot dead by British troops when they raided a safehouse on the 4th, another died in an accidental shooting on the 7th, two more (the Coffey brothers) were killed in their beds on the 14th by Black and Tans or Auxiliaries, three died at Upton on the 15th and four were killed on the 16th when they were arrested by the Essex Regiment in Kilbrittain while digging a trench and shot dead. Barry remembered that the failure of the attack "seared [Hurley]" and that he "mourned deeply for his dead comrades of the Upton train attack and for the dead civilians".

Of the eleven dead, only those at Upton were killed in combat.

The Upton attack also highlighted the dangers, and particularly the risk to civilians, of attacking trains carrying troops. Only a month later at the Headford Ambush in neighbouring County Kerry, an IRA column successfully attacked a train-load of troops, but again, there were civilian casualties alongside the IRA and British Army losses. One of the three men captured by the British at Upton is reported to have given information leading to the Third Cork Brigade's main column of over 100 fighters almost being encircled at the Crossbarry Ambush. Hurley himself was killed in this action.

The Upton ambush was the subject of a popular 1960s Irish ballad titled "The Lonely Woods of Upton".
