= Rosscarbery =

Village in County Cork, Ireland

Rosscarbery Irish: Ros Ó gCairbre
- Village
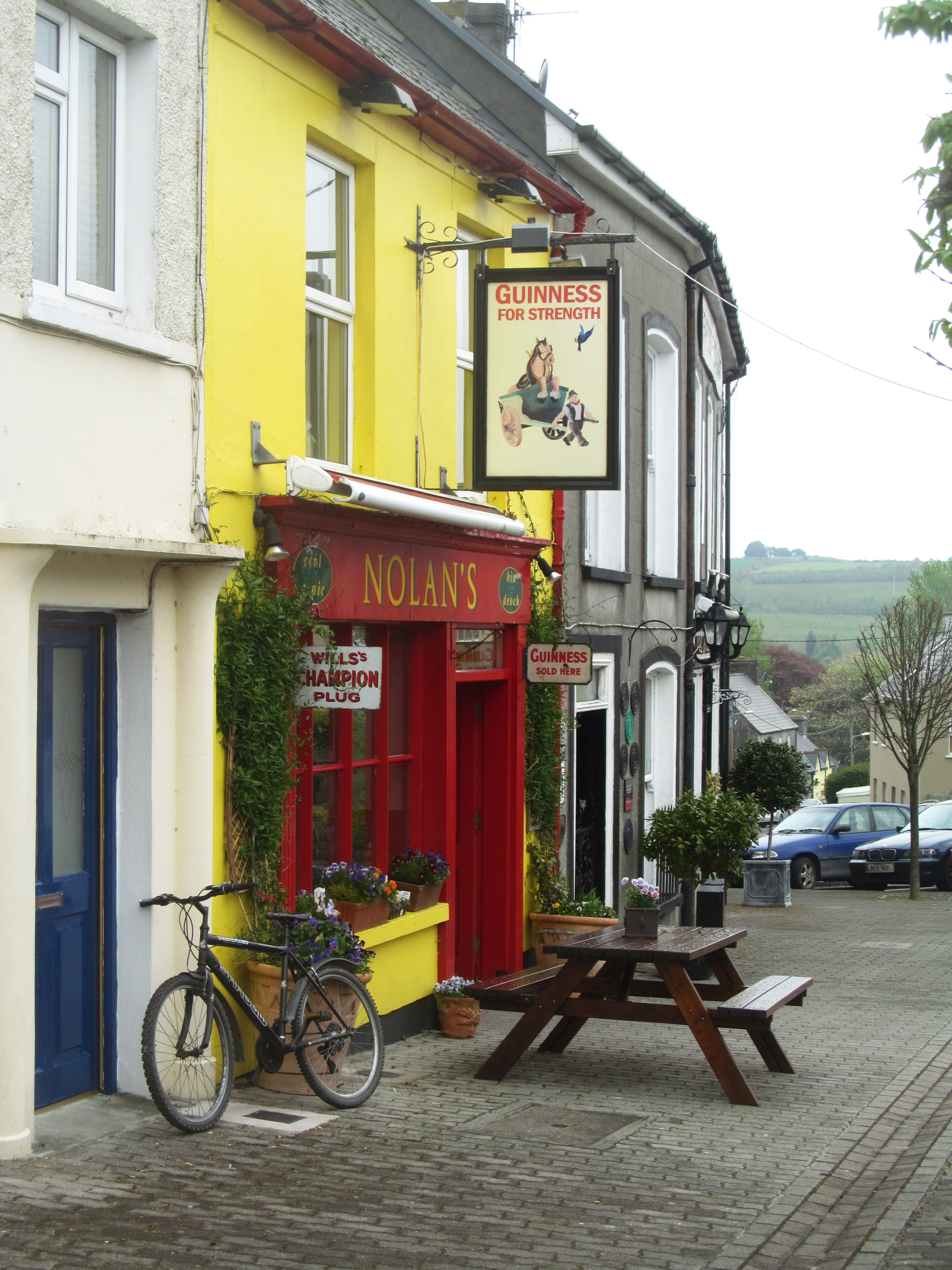
- Exterior of pub in Rosscarbery

- Location in Ireland
- Coordinates: 51°34′40.80″N 09°01′54.12″W
- Country: Ireland
- Province: Munster
- County: County Cork
- District: Clonakilty

Population (2022)
  - Total: 638
- Time zone: UTC+0 (WET)
  - Summer (DST): UTC-1 (IST (WEST))
- Website: www.rosscarbery.ie

Rosscarbery (Irish: Ros Ó gCairbre, meaning 'Cairbre's wood') is a village and census town in County Cork, Ireland. The village is on a shallow estuary, which opens onto Rosscarbery Bay. Rosscarbery is in the Cork South-West (Dáil Éireann) constituency, which has three seats.

== History ==
The area has been inhabited since at least the Neolithic period, as evidenced by several Neolithic sites such as portal dolmens. The area is also home to a number of Bronze Age remains, including a number of stone circles and ring forts. There are two inscribed stones in Burgatia, and several (later) holy wells nearby.

Rosscarbery was home to the School of Ross, a major centre of learning, at one time being a university town, and one of the major cities in Europe, around the 6th century. Due to its popularity as a centre of pilgrimage it was also known as Ros Ailithir ("Wood of the Pilgrims"). The hereditary chieftains of the area, or tuath, were the O'Learys, known as Uí Laoghaire Ruis Ó gCairbre, until it passed to Norman control in the early thirteenth century. The entire region had belonged to the ancient Corcu Loígde, of whom the O'Learys were one of the leading septs.

In March 1921, during the Irish War of Independence, Tom Barry's 3rd Cork (IRA) Brigade attacked and destroyed the Royal Irish Constabulary barracks in Rosscarbery. Two RIC officers were killed in the attack, and nine others were injured. There is a plaque on the site of the former barracks, beside the current Garda station, commemorating the event.

== Demographics ==
In the 20 years between the 1991 and 2011 census, the population of Rosscarbery grew by approximately 17%, from 455 to 534 people. As of the 2022 census, the population was 638, an increase of 19% on 2011.

As a tourist area, there are a number of holiday homes around Rosscarbery which results in an annual swell in population during summer months.

== Religion ==
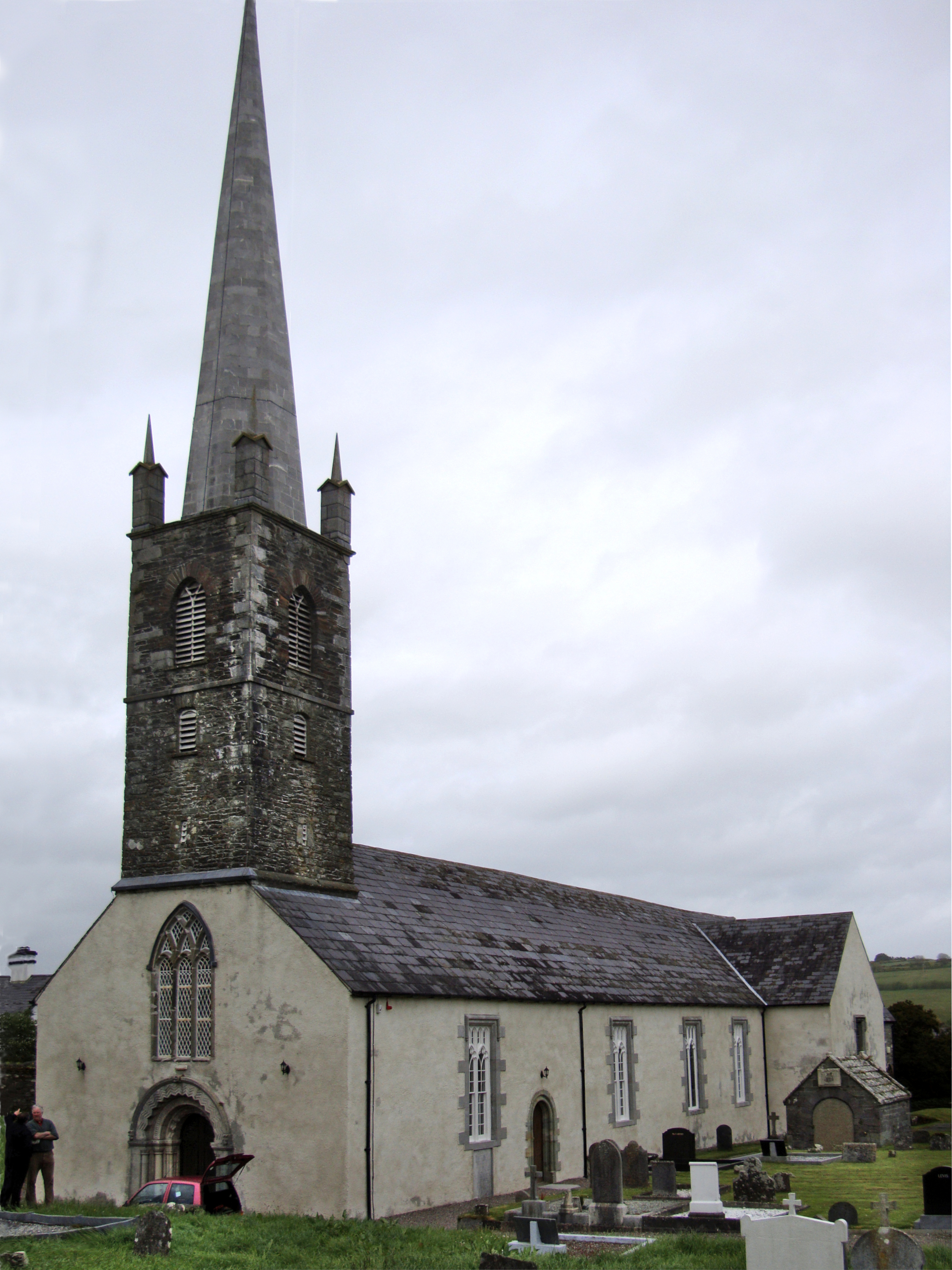
Rosscarbery Cathedral

The Church of Ireland's dioceses of Cork, Cloyne and Ross were effectively merged during rationalisation in the 1860s. The bishop of this tridiocese, Paul Colton, is based in Cork.

There is a cathedral in Rosscarbery, an unusual feature for what is now a relatively small settlement. It is a Church of Ireland cathedral - St. Fachtna's Cathedral. St Fachtna's is the smallest cathedral in Ireland, and is the size of a typical parish church.

The Catholic church, in the diocese of Cork and Ross, is also called St. Fachtna's and dates from 1820.

== Places of interest ==
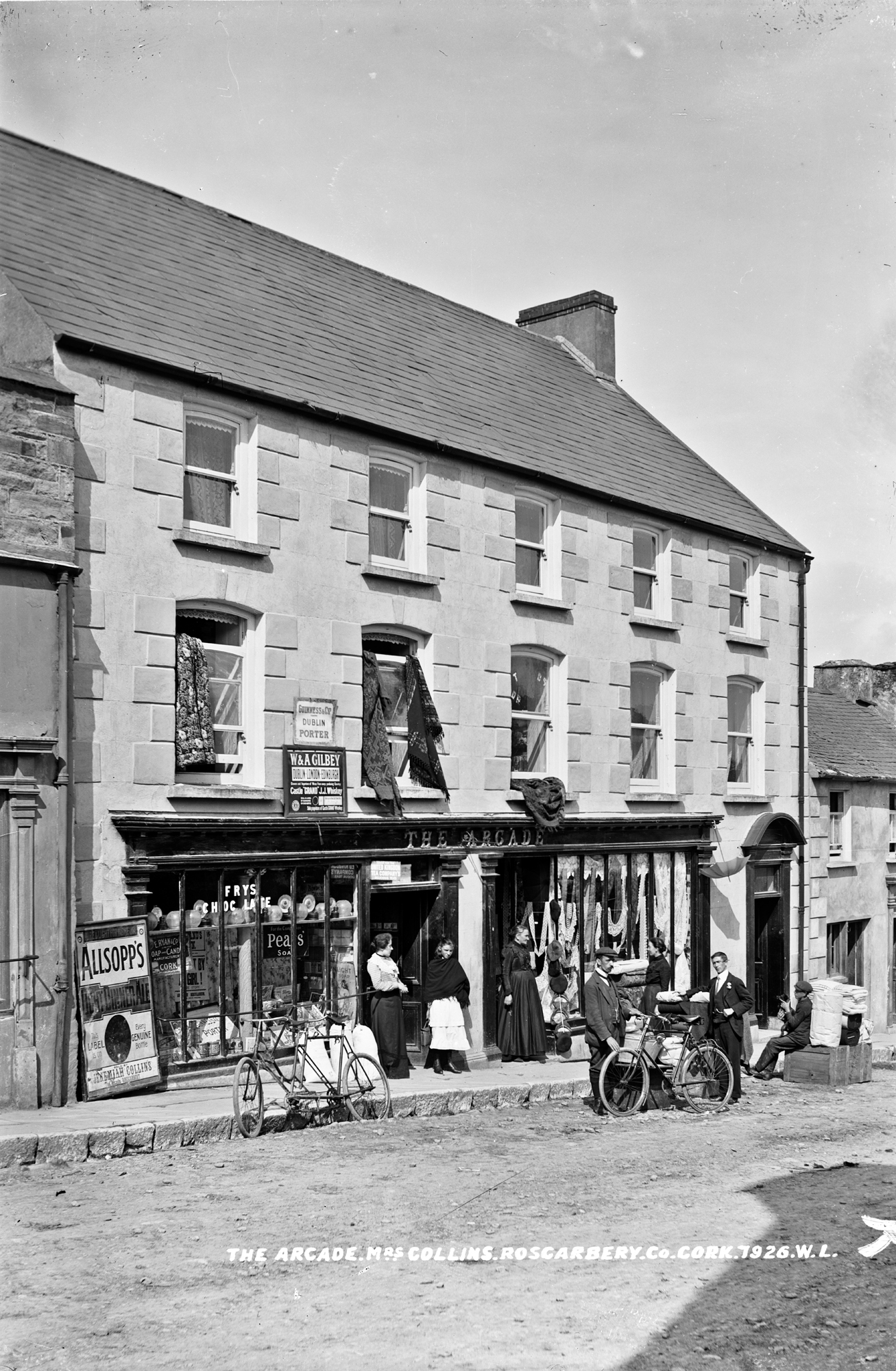
Collins' shop on Chapel Street in Rosscarbery at the turn of the 20th century

=== Square ===
An annual horse fair is held in Rosscarbery's square every year in August.

=== Beaches ===
Rosscarbery is a tourist destination in the summertime, being in proximity to at least three beaches. The nearest of these, the "Warren Beach", is about a mile from the village, and is designated a blue flag beach, along with the nearby Owenahincha beach. Extensive coastal erosion at Warren Beach resulted in remedial works being undertaken throughout 2004 and 2005. Rosscarbery Pitch & Putt Club is located at the beach.

=== Estuary ===
Rosscarbery has a tidal estuary and mudflat on the south side of the main road and causeway (N71) and a large brackish lagoon on the north side. At the west end of the causeway, south of the main road is a small lagoon with reed beds.

=== Antiquities ===
Bohonagh is a recumbent stone circle located 2.4 km east of Rosscarbery. It dates to the Bronze Age and a boulder-burial is located nearby.

Castle Salem is also near the village, and was the home to the Morris family from around 1660 until the early 1800s. The castle is now a guest house and run by the family who bought the castle in 1895.

== Transport ==
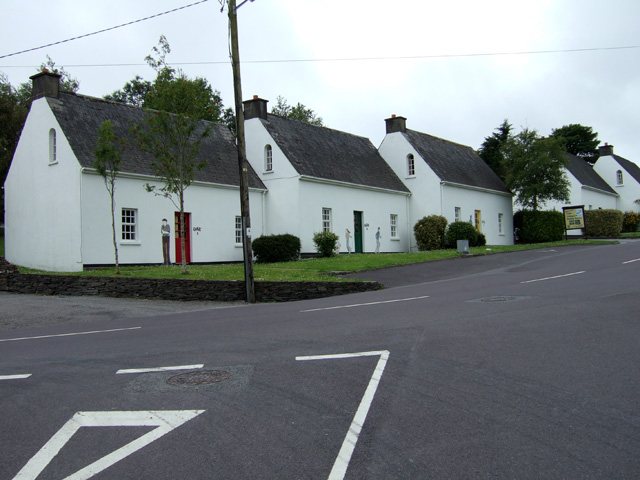
Holiday cottages at Rosscarbery

Rosscarbery is on the N71 road that runs through counties Cork and Kerry. The nearest town is Clonakilty (10 kilometres (6 mi) to the north-east). Cork city is 53 kilometres (33 mi) to the north-east.

There are bus routes serving Rosscarbery that operate along the N71.

The nearest airport is Cork Airport.

== Sport ==
The local Gaelic Athletic Association club is Carbery Rangers, founded in 1887. In November 2003, Carbery Rangers won their first ever football County Junior A title, and subsequently a Junior Munster, Intermediate County, Munster, and All-Ireland titles. The club has since graduated to the senior ranks.

Rosscarbery Rowing Club competes at regattas in West Cork and at the Irish Coastal Rowing Federation Championships each August.

== People ==
- Fachtna of Rosscarbery (died c. 600), founder of Ros Ailithir monastery.
- Airbertach mac Cosse (died c. 1016), was a poet and the lector and superior of Ros Ailithir monastery.
- William Thompson (1775–1833), the Irish political and philosophical writer and socialist reformer, was also connected with Rosscarbery
- Jeremiah O'Donovan Rossa (1831–1915), a leader of the Irish Fenian movement, was from Rosscarbery
- Tom Barry (1897–1980), a leader of the Irish War of Independence, is also associated with the area. Born in Kerry to Cork parents, as of the 1901 census records his family were living in Killorglin, where Barry's father [also Thomas] was posted to Killorglin barracks as an RIC constable. Tom Barry had moved to Rosscarbery with his family by 1911, and a Rosscarbery house bears a plaque to this effect. In his memoir, Guerrilla Days in Ireland, Barry recalls riding a cow through the main street to amuse other boys.
- John Hodnett (b.1999), a rugby union player for Munster.

== Annalistic references ==
See Annals of Inisfallen (AI)

- AI924.1 Kl. Gothbraid, grandson of Ímar, went by sea westwards and took the hostages of the south of Ireland by sea to Ros Ailithir.
- AI933.2 Repose of Ólchobar, abbot of Ros Ailithir.
- AI954.2 Repose of Dub Inse, learned bishop of Ireland, and of Cellachán, king of Caisel, and of Éladach the learned, abbot of Ros Ailithir, and of Uarach, bishop of Imlech Ibuir, and of Célechair, abbot of Cluain Moccu Nóis and Cluain Iraird, and of Cormac Ua Maíl Shluaig, learned sage of Mumu, and of Lugaid Ua Maíl Shempail, abbot of Domnach Pátraic, and of Cenn Faelad son of Suibne, anchorite of Cluain Ferta Brénainn.

== See also ==
- List of abbeys and priories in Ireland (County Cork)
- List of towns and villages in Ireland
