= Kilbrogan House =

Georgian house in Ireland

Coordinates: 51.7491°N 8.7400°W

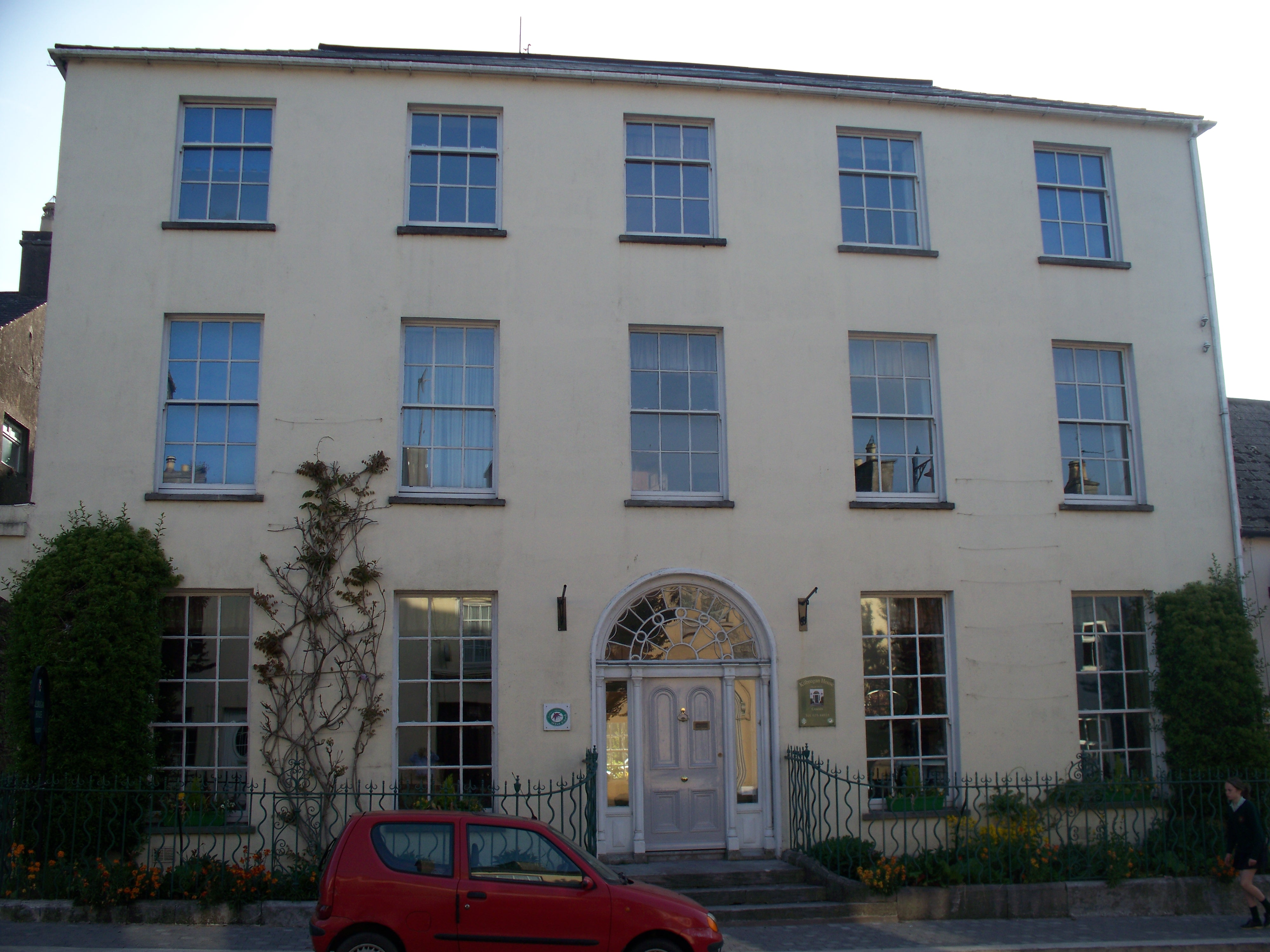
Kilbrogan House

Kilbrogan House is an early 19th century Georgian house situated in Bandon in County Cork, Ireland. The house was built in 1818 on Kilbrogan Hill near the centre of Bandon.

== History ==
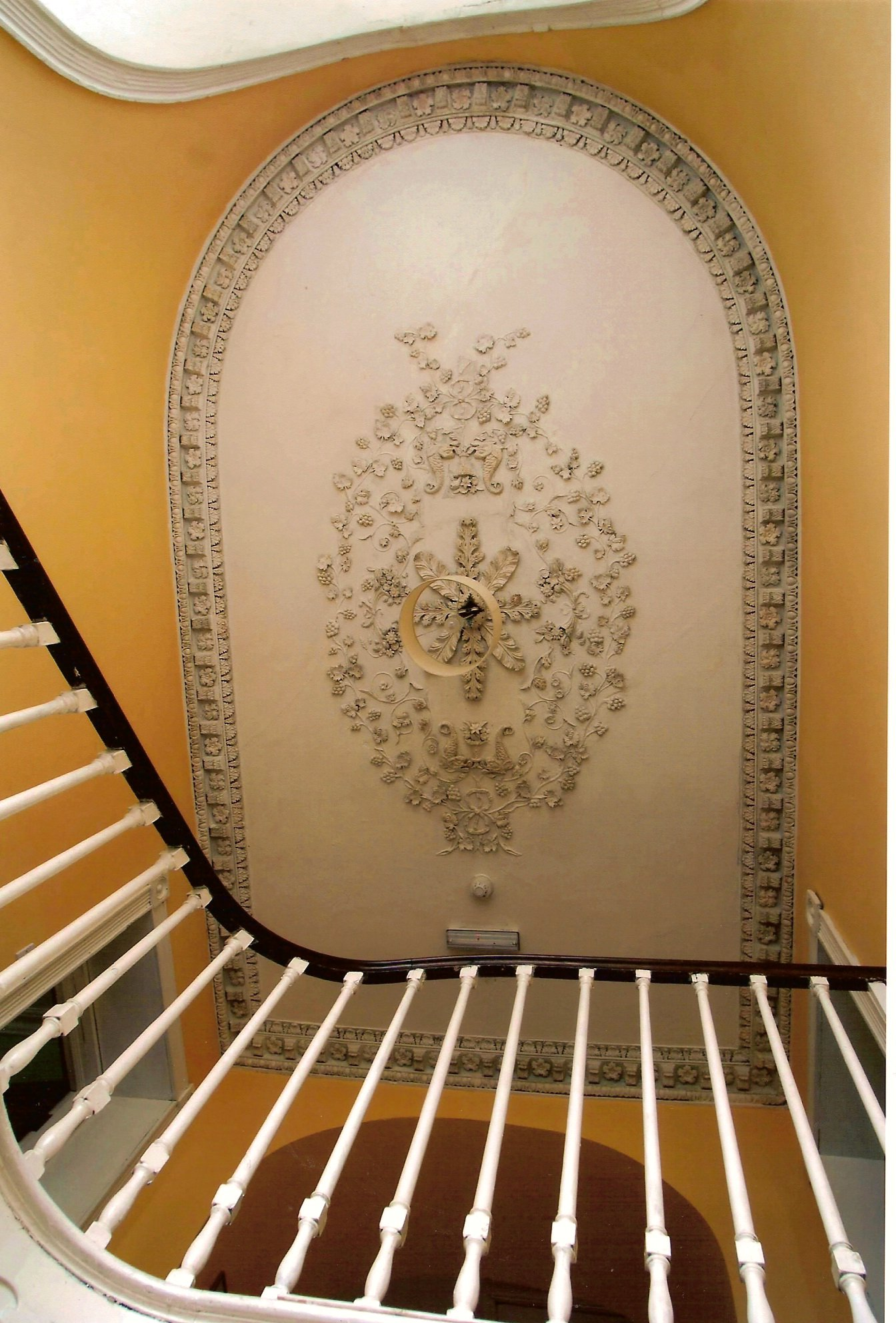
Stairs and ceiling plasterwork at Kilbrogan

Kilbrogan House was built in 1818 on the Bandon estate of William Cavendish, 6th Duke of Devonshire. Remaining original features include ornate plaster work and exterior limestone steps.

Originally owned by the Devonshire estate and let to several tenants, in the 1890s the freehold was sold to Richard Wheeler Doherty. Doherty leased the house to Joseph Brennan, whose business interests included a local bakery, brewery, flour mill and an electric company which supplied electricity to Bandon from 1919 to 1939. In October 1920, during the Irish War of Independence, much of Bandon (including Brennan's businesses and Kilbrogan House) was attacked by British soldiers as part of a series of indiscriminate reprisals following an IRA ambush at Ballinhassig. Joseph Brennan's son, also named Joseph Brennan and also associated with the house, was governor of the Central Bank of Ireland from 1943 to 1953.

The house changed hands several times, until the then owner renovated it in the 1990s. Operated as a bed and breakfast for several years, as of mid-2021 it was "no longer in operation" as accommodation.
