= Crossbarry ambush =

1921 ambush of the Irish War of Independence

- Part of the Irish War of Independence
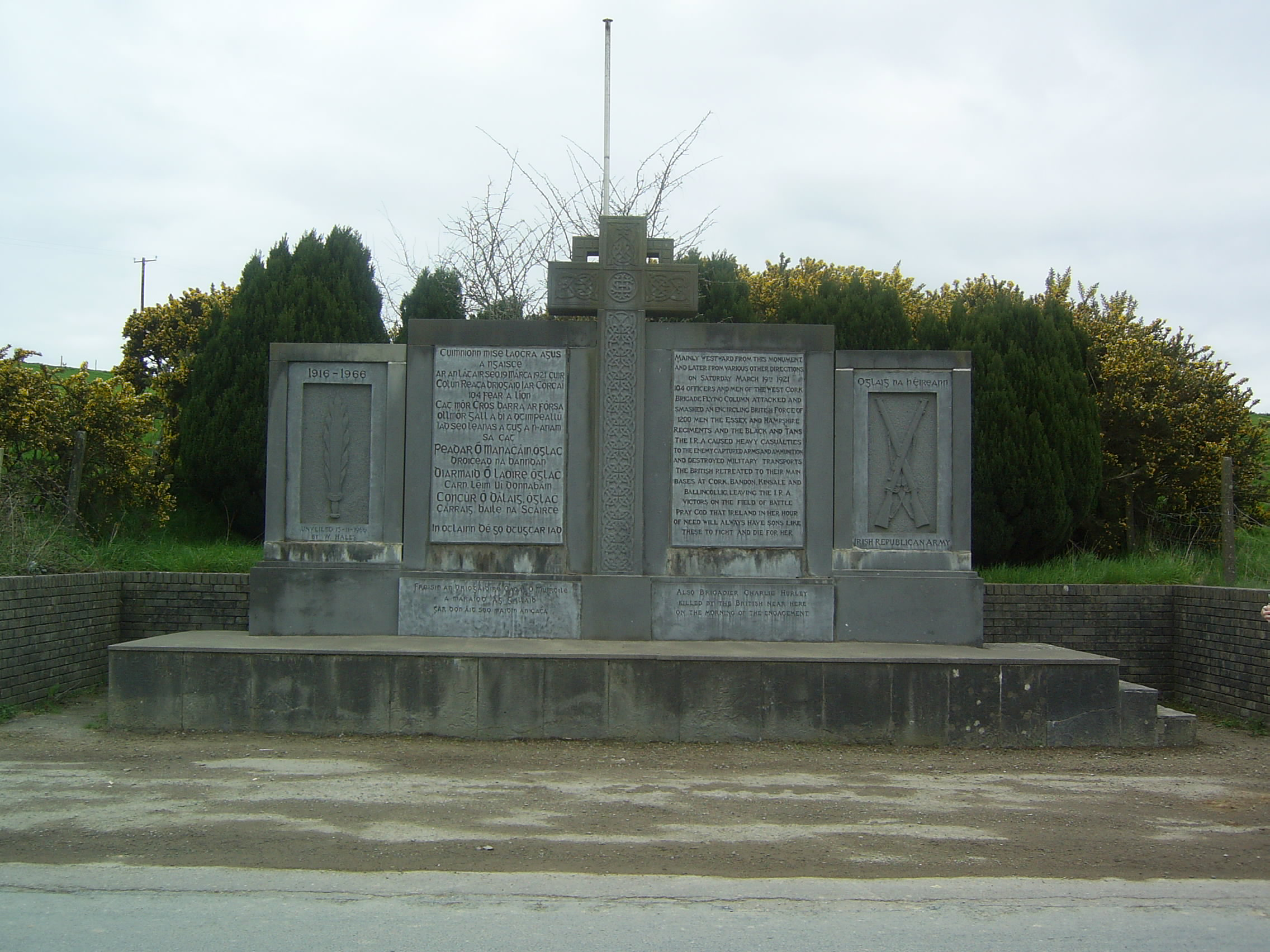
- Crossbarry memorial
Date	19 March 1921
Location	Crossbarry, County Cork, Ireland 51.802°N 8.645°W
Result	IRA victory: Column escapes encirclement

Belligerents
(United Kingdom of Great Britain and Ireland) British Army (Essex Regiment) (United Kingdom of Great Britain and Ireland) Royal Irish Constabulary (Auxiliary Division)	Irish Republican Army (3rd Cork Brigade)

Commanders and leaders
(United Kingdom of Great Britain and Ireland) Arthur Percival	Tom Barry

Strength
1,200 British troops 120 Auxiliaries	104 volunteers

Casualties and losses
10 killed 5 wounded	3–6 killed 3 wounded
- Location within island of Ireland

The Crossbarry ambush, also known as the Battle of Crossbarry, occurred on 19 March 1921 and was one of the largest engagements of the Irish War of Independence. It took place near the small village of Crossbarry in County Cork, about 20 km south-west of Cork city. About a hundred Irish Republican Army (IRA) volunteers, commanded by Tom Barry, escaped an attempt by about 1,200 British troops to encircle them. During the hour-long battle, ten British troops and three IRA volunteers were killed.

== Background ==
The increasing success of the IRA's 3rd Cork Brigade led to a spate of arrests and interrogations of suspected IRA volunteers in West Cork, in an effort to discover the identities and headquarters of the guerrillas. At this point the column had a total of 104 volunteers. On 15 February 1921, the IRA mounted an abortive ambush of a troop train at Upton, in which six civilians and three IRA volunteers died. Several other volunteers were captured. The British succeeded in breaking an IRA volunteer under torture and discovered that the West Cork Brigade had its headquarters in Ballymurphy. The British also learned that the Brigade had recently returned to this area after several days waiting for an ambush on the Kinsale–Bandon road.

== Engagement ==
The British commanders thus planned a major operation to capture the IRA column, mobilising about 350 troops in total, to converge on the area from several different directions. According to Tom Barry, 400 British troops came from Cork, 200 from Ballincollig, 300 from Kinsale and 350 from Bandon. These numbers have been contradicted by military studies, also by reports from locals in Crossbarry reporting 34 British vehicles were counted in the area as well as eye-witness evidence from Florence Begley. Later in the day about 120 Auxiliaries also left Macroom. The British sweep was mounted early on the morning of 19 March. At Crossbarry, some of the troops descended from their lorries to proceed on foot or bicycle to try and catch the IRA unaware.

One early victim of the action was Charlie Hurley, the IRA Commanding Officer of the Cork Number Three Brigade. Hurley, who was recovering from a serious wound sustained at the Upton ambush, was trapped in a house and killed at about 6:30am. Tom Barry, only becoming aware of the danger at the last minute, resolved that his men, 104 strong, would have to fight their way out of the encirclement. Barry's calculation was that his men, who had only 40 rounds per man, could not sustain an all day fight, which they could expect if they retired before the British. Moreover, the likelihood was that the small column would be trapped if it took this course of action. However, Barry observed that one of the British columns advancing towards Crossbarry was well ahead of the other British units. If his men could break through this British force, roughly the same strength as his own force, then they could break out of the British encirclement.

Barry laid out an ambush for the British at Crossbarry cross roads—his men being in position by 5:30 am. The first British lorries, about 12 vehicles according to Barry's account, came into view of the IRA at 8:00 am. When they reached Crossbarry, they were caught by surprise and hit by a crossfire at very close range—between 5 yards (4.6 m) and 10 yards (9.1 m). They took significant casualties and many of them fled the scene. Barry's men collected the British arms and ammunition before setting fire to the lorries. At this point, they were attacked again by another British column of about 200, coming from the southwest, but they too retreated after a stiff fire fight. The renewed fire led to the day's three IRA fatalities. Two more British units converging on the area from the southeast tried to dislodge the IRA from their ambush position, but again without success and they too fled in disorder.

Taking the chance offered by his quick victory to get away, Barry then marched his men to safety in the Gurranereigh area, while the British were still disoriented by the ambush. There was another brief exchange of fire at long range as the IRA column got away. The action had lasted for under an hour. On realising what had happened, Major Percival of the Essex Regiment rushed to the scene with his troops, but was only able to open a long range fire on the fleeing IRA men. He later blamed the failure of the British operation on the Auxiliary column which had gone to the wrong rendezvous point and had therefore left a gap in the encirclement. There were some further firefights along the IRA column's line of retreat at Crowhill and Rearour but with no further casualties on either side.

Barry's account does not mention the use of the explosives, but contemporary press accounts reported that the three British lorries were destroyed by a mine planted under the bridge at Crossbarry and detonated as they passed.

== Aftermath ==
The reports of casualties inflicted in the ambush varied according to the source that reported them. Barry reported that three of his men were killed in the fight and another three wounded. British accounts claimed that six IRA men had died. The IRA claimed that over thirty British soldiers were killed in the action. Volunteer Tom Kelleher—a Section Leader in Barry's column— claimed that he alone personally shot and either killed or wounded 22 British soldiers during the fire-fight. The British stated their losses were 10 killed and three wounded. The RIC memorial records that one RIC constable and six soldiers were killed. The New York Times, published the following day, reported the casualties as seven soldiers and one policeman killed, and seven IRA men killed. According to historian Peter Hart, the figure of 10 Crown forces personnel killed and four wounded, was "given in internal police and military documents and verified at the inquest",

Historian Michael Hopkinson concludes of the action, "With considerable justice, Crossbarry is regarded as victory for the IRA, but can also be seen as a missed opportunity for the British".

== See also ==
- Chronology of the Irish War of Independence
- Kilmichael ambush
- Tooreen ambush

== Sources ==
- Tom Barry, Guerilla Days in Ireland (1949, reprinted 1981).
- 15 KILLED IN CORK IN AMBUSH FIGHT; Seven Sinn Feiners Among the Dead and 20 Are Taken Prisoner by Troops. THREE LORRIES BLOWN UP Other Attacks and Reprisals in the Same County Spread a Reign of Terror, The New York Times, 20 March 1921.
