= Tom Barry (Irish republican) =

Irish guerrilla leader (1897–1980)

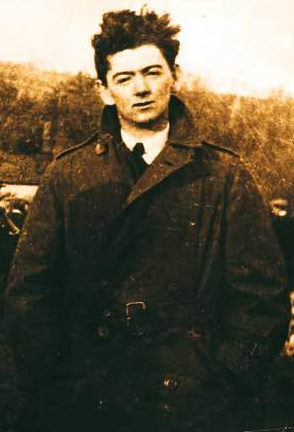
- Barry c. 1922

Chief of Staff of the IRA
- In office 1937–1937
- Preceded by: Seán MacBride
- Succeeded by: Mick Fitzpatrick

Personal details
- Born: 1 July 1897 Killorglin, County Kerry, Ireland
- Died: 2 July 1980 (aged 83) Cork, Ireland
- Resting place: St. Finbarr's Cemetery, Cork
- Spouse: Leslie de Barra (m. 1921)
- Education: Ardagh' Boys' National School; Mungret College

Military service
- Allegiance: United Kingdom; Irish Republic; Ireland
- Branch/service: British Army; Irish Republican Army; Anti-Treaty IRA; Irish Defence Forces
- Rank: General (Note: As chief of staff: e.g. see Liam Lynch.)
- Unit: Irish Republican Army
- Commands: Officer Commanding, 3rd (West) Cork Brigade, Irish Republican Army; Chief of Staff, Irish Republican Army; Operations Officer, Irish Army's Southern Command
- Battles/wars: World War I; Mesopotamian campaign; Siege of Kut; Irish War of Independence; Tooreen ambush; Kilmichael ambush; Crossbarry ambush; Irish Civil War

Thomas Bernardine Barry (1 July 1897 – 2 July 1980) was an Irish republican. He was a prominent guerrilla leader in the Irish Republican Army (IRA) during the Irish War of Independence and the Irish Civil War. Barry is often known for orchestrating the Kilmichael ambush, in which he and his flying column attacked an 18-man patrol of Auxiliaries, killing sixteen men.

Born in County Kerry, Barry was the son of a former Royal Irish Constabulary (RIC) constable. In 1915, at the age of seventeen, he joined the British Army and would go on to see action as a gunner in the Middle East during the First World War. Despite expressing some British patriotism during his early years, Barry's views slowly began to change towards Irish republicanism. In his memoir, Barry stated that this started shortly after he heard about the Easter Rising in 1916, though records show that after the war he made two unsuccessful attempts at joining the British Civil Service. In July 1920, he joined the IRA's 3rd Cork Brigade. Using his experience from his time in the British Army, he was able to train up the men in the flying column so it could become an effective fighting unit. Barry then became the column's overall commander and would lead the Brigade in a number of successful attacks against British forces, including the ambushes at Kilmichael and Crossbarry.

Barry was prominent amongst the Anti-Treaty IRA republicans who opposed the Anglo-Irish Treaty. Following the outbreak of the civil war, Barry was briefly imprisoned by the new Irish Free State but managed to escape and go on to command Anti-Treaty forces in the southern regions of Ireland. When it became clear that victory could not be achieved, Barry proposed that the Anti-Treaty IRA should lay down their arms, which led to frequent clashes with Liam Lynch. Barry still continued to be a part of the IRA after the civil war and served briefly as its commander-in-chief in 1937, during which he devised a proposed plan for an IRA offensive into Northern Ireland and opened contacts with Nazi Germany. After leaving the IRA, Barry would write Guerrilla Days in Ireland (1949), a memoir about his service in World War I and in Ireland.

Fellow republican Dan Breen regarded Barry as the best leader of any IRA flying column.

== Early life ==
Barry was born in Killorglin, County Kerry. He was the son of a Royal Irish Constabulary policeman Thomas Barry and his wife Margaret Donovan. Four years later, Thomas Barry Senior resigned and opened a business in his hometown of Rosscarbery, County Cork. Barry was first educated at Ardagh Boys' National School before later attending Mungret College in County Limerick from 25 August 1911 to 12 September 1912. The reason for his short stay is indicated by a reference from the school register of the Apostolic School, Mungret College: "Went–Home (ran away) without knowledge of superiors – no vocation".

== World War I ==
In 1915, during Ireland's involvement in World War I, he enlisted in the Royal Field Artillery at Cork and became a soldier in the British Army.

In June, in my seventeenth year, I had decided to see what this Great War was like. I cannot plead I went on the advice of John Redmond or any other politician, that if we fought for the British we would secure Home Rule for Ireland, nor can I say I understood what Home Rule meant. I was not influenced by the lurid appeal to fight to save Belgium or small nations. I knew nothing about nations, large or small. I went to the war for no other reason than that I wanted to see what war was like, to get a gun, to see new countries and to feel a grown man. Above all, I went because I knew no Irish history and had no national consciousness.

Barry enlisted in the Royal Field Artillery on 30 June 1915 and was sent to the military depot at Athlone for basic training. After six months he was posted to the Mesopotamian front (modern Iraq) on 21 January 1916. He fought from January 1916 in Mesopotamia (then part of the Ottoman Empire). On 1 March, he was raised to the rank of corporal. In April, while his brigade was attempting to break the Turkish Siege of Kut, Barry first heard of the Easter Rising, which he describes in his memoir as "a rude awakening". Perhaps, in reaction to the British response to the Rising, Barry dropped his rank at his own request on 26 May and reverted to his original rank of gunner, which he would hold until the end of the war.

From January 1917 until March 1918, he saw further action south of Kut, where his unit suffered heavy casualties, and also at Fallujah, Samarra and Baquba. In May 1918, his division was moved to the Egyptian front for the campaign in Palestine. Barry, however, remained in Egypt from June 1918 until February 1919, when he was shipped back to Ireland. Barry had some minor disciplinary issues in the Army, being punished on a number of occasions for being late for parade and disrespectful to NCOs. Nevertheless, when officially discharged from the army on 7 April 1919 Barry was described as a sober, good, hardworking man.

== War of Independence ==
On his return to Bandon in County Cork, Barry first began to study Law and Business Affairs, while at the same time maintaining friendship with local ex-servicemen's organisations and building connections to the Irish republican movement. Initially Barry seemed proud of his wartime British Army service and hoisted a Union flag at Bandon on the first anniversary of the war's end in November 1919. For this reason he was distrusted by some local republicans, particularly Tom Hales.

In fact Barry acted as secretary to the Bandon Branch of the ex-servicemen's association, which was headed by local unionist the Earl of Bandon, from mid-1919 until mid-1920. He also applied to join the British Civil Service and for a posting to India, but seems to have failed the relevant exams.

Barry claimed in his Military Pension Application in 1940 that he had been infiltrating the ex-servicemen's organisation on orders from IRA Intelligence officer Sean Buckley and was secretly enrolled in the IRA from August 1919.

However, it was only in July 1920 that he formally applied join the 3rd (West) Cork Brigade of the Irish Republican Army (IRA), which was then engaged in the Irish War of Independence (1919–1921). A number of events have been cited as influencing his decision to join the IRA. One was his failure to secure employment after the war. Another was the death of fellow ex-serviceman John Bourke, a veteran of the Royal Munster Fusiliers, who was bayoneted to death in a riot between Irish veterans and British troops; Barry acted as a guard of honour at Bourke's funeral. A possible third reason was the brutal beating of IRA members Tom Hales and Patrick Harte, both of whom were from Bandon, by officers of the Essex Regiment during an interrogation in July 1920.

Before being accepted into the IRA, he was first interviewed by IRA officers Ted O'Sullivan and Charlie Hurley, in order to vet him. Having overcome the suspicion he could be a spy, and helped by the fact that Tom Hales had been arrested and replaced as Brigade commander by Charlie Hurley, by late summer he was acting as their brigade training officer. Barry was initially highly valued by the IRA for his military experience and his ability to train their own raw volunteers.

At this time the IRA's guerrilla tactics were taking shape and small groups of dedicated guerrillas were being organised and trained. Barry participated in four training camps and two attacks on British forces in the autumn of 1920 – the Fanlobus ambush on 9 October and the Tooreen Ambush on 22 October, at the latter of which he commanded a section. He also tried, with Charlie Hurley, to assassinate a number of local police and judicial officials.

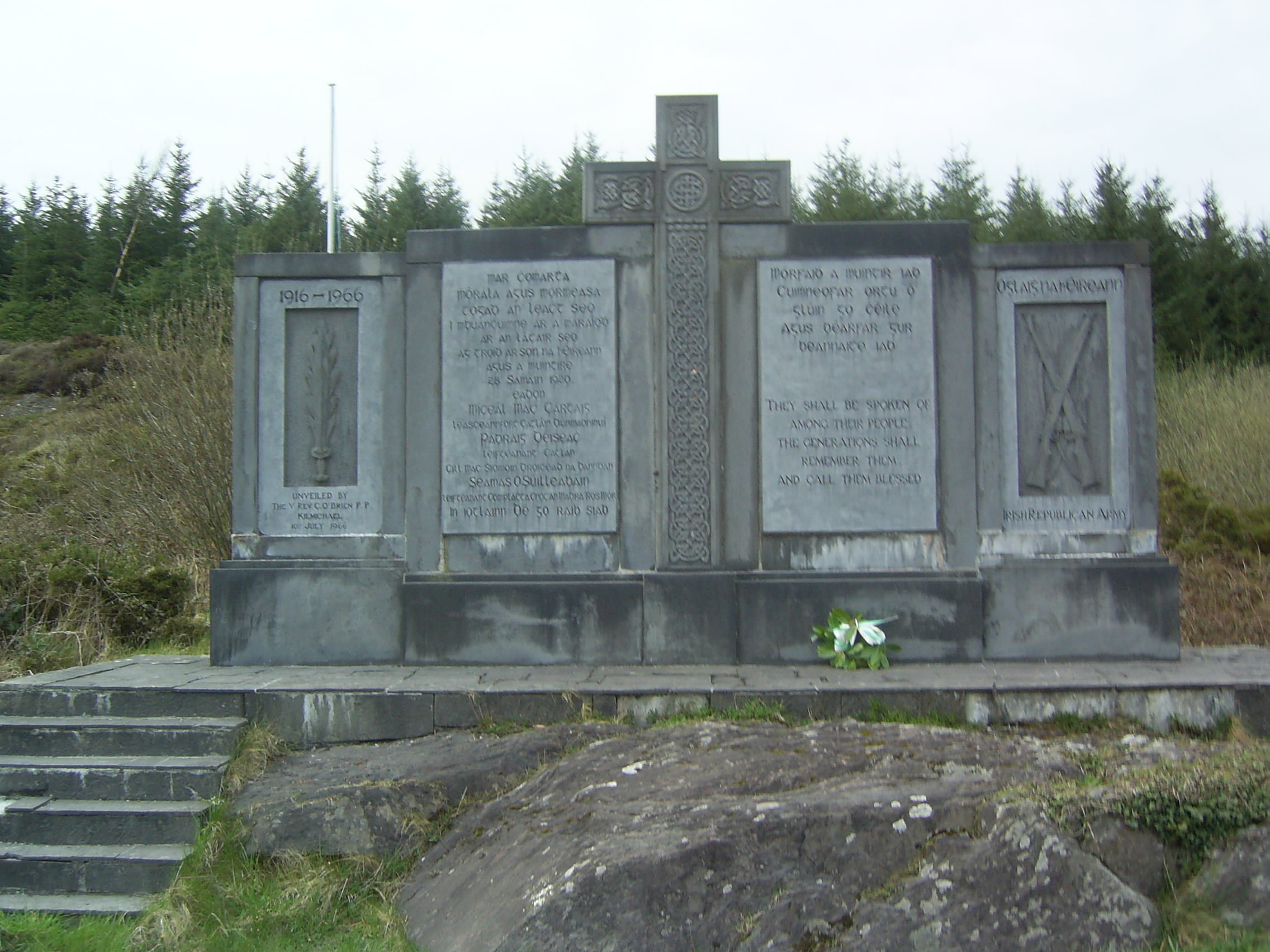
The Kilmichael memorial

However, Barry soon came to command the West Cork Brigade's flying column and definitively made his name as a guerrilla commander at the Kilmichael Ambush on 28 November 1920. This was a turning point of the war, when a company of 18 Auxiliaries was wiped out at the cost three IRA killed. The British alleged that Barry's men had killed wounded and surrendering Auxiliaries and mutilated their corpses. This was a charge that Barry always denied, claiming that he had ordered that no prisoners be taken after the Auxiliaries faked a surrender resulting in the death of some of his men.

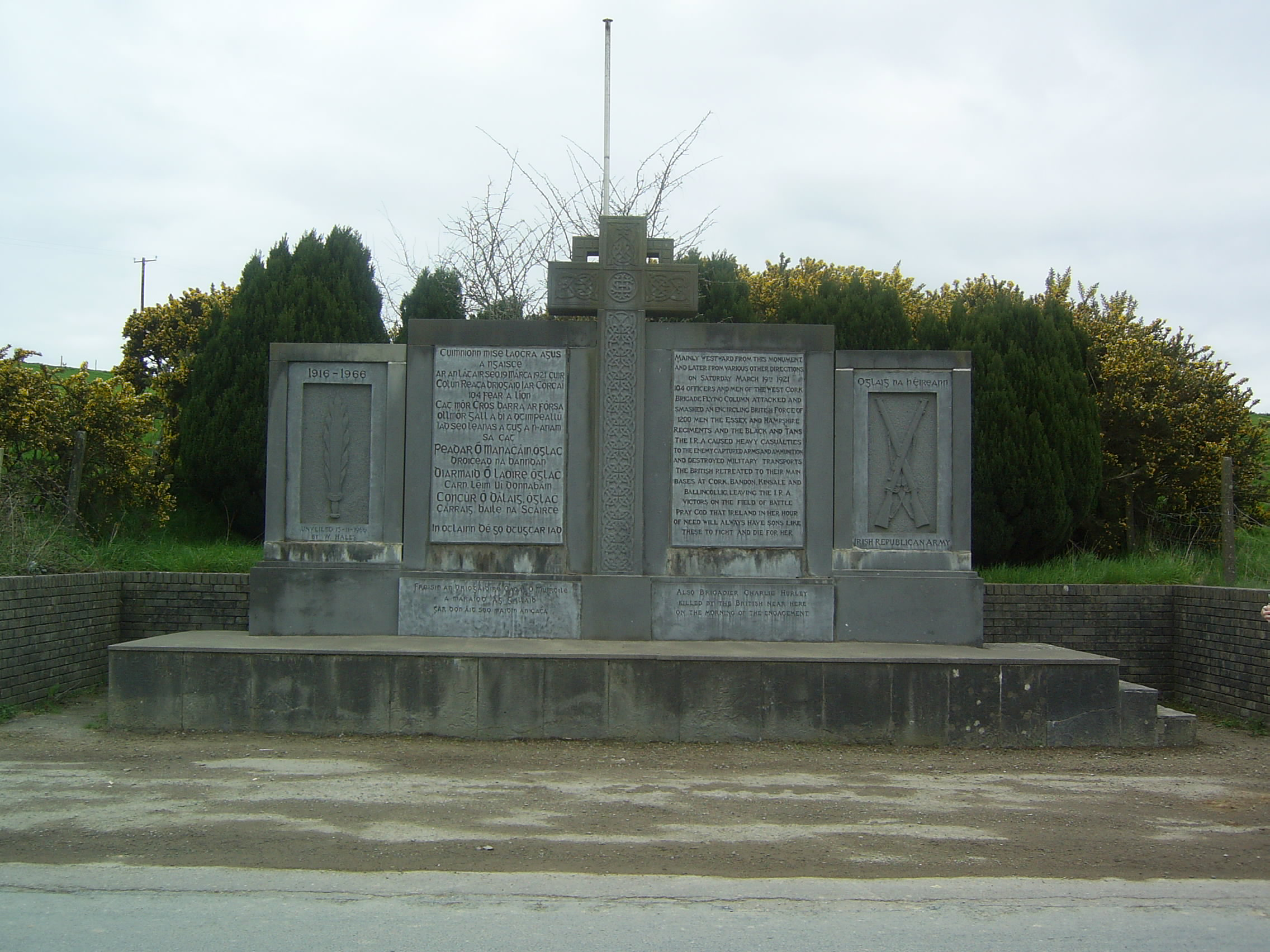
Crossbarry Memorial, Crossbarry, County Cork. In March 1921, 104 Irish Republican Army volunteers under the command of Tom Barry attacked and later escaped from an encircling manoeuvre by 1,200 British soldiers and Black and Tans.

Barry was hospitalised for a time after the Kilmichael action and martial law was proclaimed in County Cork and across much of the province of Munster in response. However, in December the column regrouped, attacking a number of police and military barracks in the West Cork region. In one such instance in February 1921, Barry's column attempted to launch an attack on the RIC Barracks in Rosscarbery, billeting at Burgatia House, which was owned by a Loyalist family, to avoid detection. However, a contingent of Black and Tans was sent out to arrest them after being tipped off by a postman. After a brief firefight, Barry and his men were able to push them back and escape. The column, which was around 30–40 strong, dispersed shortly afterwards into smaller units and subsequently lost 11 men killed. Three men died in the Upton Train Ambush and eight more died in various incidents and encounters with British forces.

In March 1921, Barry mobilised his largest guerrilla force of 104 men, divided into seven sections, and at the Crossbarry Ambush broke out of an encirclement of 1,200 strong British force from the Essex Regiment. At least ten British soldiers were killed in the action, along with three IRA volunteers including Brigade commander Charlie Hurley.

In total, British forces numbered over 12,500 men in County Cork during the conflict, while Barry's men numbered no more than 310. Eventually, Barry's tactics made West Cork ungovernable for the British authorities except by military means. In the late spring and early summer of 1921, British forces mounted large sweeps of the West Cork area, complete with aerial surveillance and armoured vehicles, forcing Barry's column to spend much of its time "on the run" in mountainous terrain to avoid them. While they did avoid being encircled, they were able to mount only one more major attack, which was on Rosscarbery police barracks in late March 1921.

Barry's ability as a guerrilla commander was widely acknowledged in the IRA, and in the early summer of 1921 he was summoned to Dublin to meet with IRA leader Michael Collins and President of the Irish Republic Éamon de Valera. He also participated in the formation of the IRA's First Southern Division, of which he was made Deputy Commander.

Barry openly admitted in his memoir to taking a hard line with people he believed were collaborators with the British forces. He stated that his unit executed 16 civilians accused of informing in the first six months of 1921. While he acknowledged that nine of the 16 killings were Protestants, who were a minority in West Cork, he maintained that they were killed for no other reason than for their aid to British forces. He maintained, "The majority of the West Cork Protestants lived at peace throughout the entire struggle and were not interfered with by the IRA". Barry also stated that his unit burned the houses of local loyalists in retaliation for burning of republicans' homes by British forces and carried out reprisal killings of captured and off-duty British soldiers in response to the execution of IRA men.

The war in rural Cork was abruptly ended with a truce, negotiated to come into effect on 11 July 1921. At this time the West Cork flying column was, with other IRA units, in a training camp in the mountains along the Cork/Kerry border. Barry recalled his initial reaction as "dazed and uncertain of the future" but relief that the "days of fear were ended, at least for a time". He claimed that his unit had killed over 100 British troops and wounded another 93 during the conflict.

Barry later wrote of the period:

They said I was ruthless, daring, savage, blood thirsty, even heartless. The clergy called me and my comrades murderers; but the British were met with their own weapons. They had gone in the mire to destroy us and our nation and down after them we had to go.

== Civil War ==
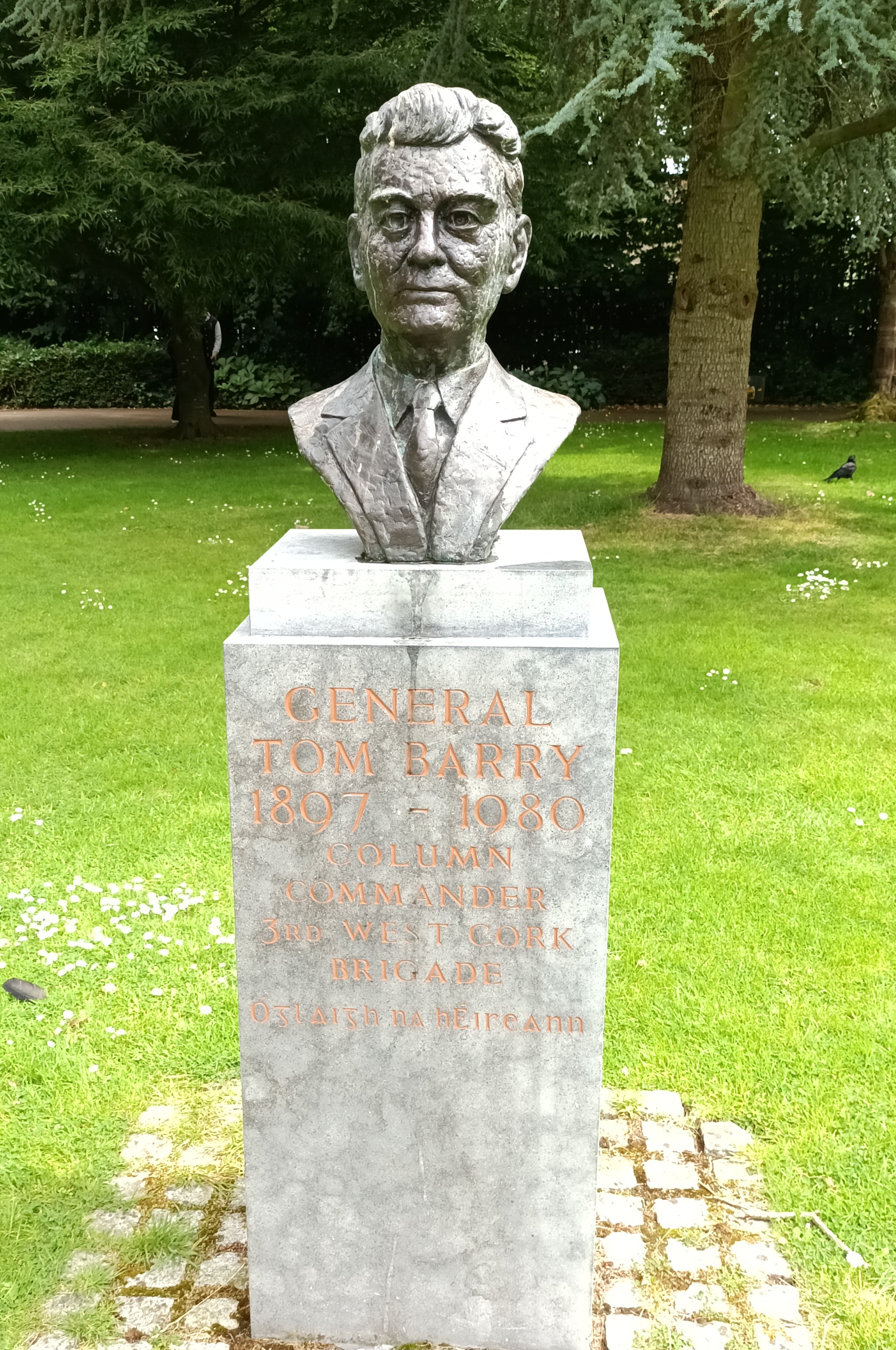
Bust of Tom Barry in Fitzgerald's Park, Cork

During the truce period, Barry married Leslie Mary Price, who was herself a republican activist. Barry opposed the Anglo-Irish Treaty of 6 December 1921 because he felt it gave up the Irish Republic and accepted the partition of Ireland. In March 1922, he participated in an IRA convention which disavowed the authority of the Dáil to approve the Treaty and was elected on to the anti-Treaty IRA's executive. In March 1922, he and his men occupied barracks in Limerick in defiance of the new Irish Free State government, and it looked as if fighting would break out until Liam Lynch IRA Chief of Staff arrived and defused the situation. In May 1922, Barry along with Rory O'Connor and Ernie O'Malley seized a convoy of arms intended for the new Free State police force and drove it to the anti-Treaty IRA headquarter in the Four Courts in Dublin.

On 28 June 1922, the Irish Civil War formally broke out between Pro- and Anti-treaty factions when Free State forces opened fire on the Four Courts. Barry was in Cork at the time, but made his way to Dublin when the fighting started. He was captured while trying to get into the Four Courts and was imprisoned by the Irish Free State in Mountjoy Gaol after the Battle of Dublin in July 1922. Barry had voiced the opinion that, at the start of the civil war, while the Republican side was stronger, it should have taken over Dublin and the major cities and forced a new confrontation with the British. In September of that year, however, he escaped from an internment camp at Gormanston in County Meath and travelled south, to take command of the anti-Treaty IRA Second Southern Division. Barry returned to his previous role of guerrilla commander, leading a column of around 200 men based in West Cork. In mid-December 1922, he led his men in the capture of a string of towns across the province of Munster, including Carrick on Suir, and towns in Kilkenny, namely Thomastown and Mullinavat, killing two Irish National Army soldiers and taking prisoner the Free State garrisons there, amounting to over 110 men, and seizing their arms. However, due to a shortage of men and equipment, he was unable to hold these places, evacuating them before National Army reinforcements arrived. Withdrawing to the rugged country on the Cork/Kerry border, his column and Kerry IRA units (a total of about 65 men) mounted an assault on Millstreet early in 1923, failing to take the town, but killing two Free State soldiers and taking 39 prisoner.

However, as 1923 went on, Barry found his column increasingly weakened by casualties and arrests. By February 1923, Barry increasingly argued with Liam Lynch, the Republican commander in chief, that the war should be brought to an end, as there was no hope of victory. Barry proposed to a meeting of the IRA Executive on 23–26 March that a ceasefire should be called, but he was defeated by six votes to five. After the death of Lynch in a Free State attack on 10 April, the anti-treaty campaign was halted on 30 April, then called off when Frank Aiken issued an order on 24 May to "dump arms". One author claims that Barry tried to act as intermediary with the pro-Treaty Irish Republican Brotherhood to end the war and for a time had a letter from the Free State authorities granting him 'immunity from arrest'. This caused him to fall out with other members of the IRA Army Council. For his part, Barry stated that rumours, some spread by Republicans, about his negotiating for peace or compromise with the Free State were "absolutely false".

Nevertheless, the Free State government never formally acknowledged the end of the civil war marked by the republicans' ceasefire and dump arms order. Barry had to remain on the run until a general amnesty was declared in November 1924.

The Third Cork IRA Brigade, of which Barry commanded the Active Service Unit or flying column, lost 34 men killed in the war against the British and another 21 anti-Treatyites killed in the civil war. This made a total of 55, excluding pro-Treaty volunteers who died in the civil war but whom Barry did not record in his memoir.

== Subsequent IRA career ==
According to historian Brian Hanley, Tom Barry left the IRA shortly after the Executive had narrowly defeated his proposal (of March 1923) to hand over its arms to prevent further bloodshed between nationalists. In his letter of 11 July 1923 to the Army Executive, Barry resigned as a member of that body, the Army Council and an IRA officer. He offered his services if, at some future date, arms should be taken up again in the struggle to make Ireland an independent country. Barry's biographer Meda Ryan disputes this evidence, claiming that Barry only resigned from the IRA leadership in 1923, but remained a rank and file member before reassuming a leadership role in 1932.

He served as general superintendent of Cork Harbour Commission from 1927 to 1965. He initially proposed cooperation of the IRA and Fianna Fáil, the party led by erstwhile republican leader Éamon de Valera, especially against the Blueshirts, a militant movement born out of Pro-treaty civil war veterans. However, De Valera banned both the IRA and the Blueshirts, and Barry was imprisoned from May to December 1934 for arms possession. In March 1936, Barry was involved in the shooting dead of Vice-Admiral Henry Somerville. Four men burst into Somerville's family home at Castletownshend, Cork and fired a revolver. Somerville was targeted for recruiting local men to join the Royal Navy.

In 1937, he succeeded Seán MacBride as chief of staff. Barry made preparations for a planned IRA offensive in Northern Ireland, but the plan was ultimately cancelled days before it was set to commence as a result of leaks and the infiltration of the IRA by the Royal Ulster Constabulary. Barry would assert in later life that he opposed both the 1930s bombing campaign in England and IRA contacts with Nazi Germany. In fact, in January 1937 he had taken a trip to Germany seeking German support, which was assured to him subject to the condition that the IRA limit its actions to British military installations once war was declared. Financing was to be arranged through the Clann na Gael in the United States. The Army Convention in April 1938 adopted Seán Russell's S-Plan instead. Barry resigned as chief of staff as a result, but remained in contact with German agents at least to February 1939.

== Irish Army career ==
In 1940, Barry was made responsible for Intelligence in the Irish Army's Southern Command, a position he held, with the rank of Commandant, for the duration of World War II (see The Emergency). In 1941, he was denounced by the IRA for writing for An Cosantóir, the Irish Army's official magazine. In 1942, following the fall of Singapore to the Imperial Japanese Army, Barry purportedly sent a telegram to the British commander Arthur Percival, who was his opponent during the war of independence, "congratulating" him on the defence.

== Later life ==
He was an unsuccessful candidate at the 1946 Cork Borough by-election, running as an Independent and finishing last out of the four candidates with 8.7% of the first preference votes.

In 1966, Barry was invited to a number of events commemorating the 50th anniversary of the Easter Rising but declined each one of them, expressing that he felt it wouldn't be appropriate to partake in any commemoration as he was serving in the Middle East at the time of the rising. On 10 July the same year, Barry attended the unveiling of the monument to the Kilmichael ambush along with other surviving participants, where they formed a guard of honour during the ceremony.

Barry took a militant line on the Northern Ireland conflict post 1969, arguing in 1971 that peaceful means would never achieve Irish unity and supporting armed action there. However, he remained opposed to IRA bombings which led to civilian deaths and by 1977, appeared to have grown disillusioned with the IRA campaign, stating, "the men who were carrying out the recent killings... could not be called IRA". He refused in that year to lend his support to Provisional IRA hunger strikers in Portlaoise Prison. He was against the tactics of the Provisional IRA's campaign, particularly their use of car bombs against civilians, though he did defend attacks on British soldiers on active duty in Northern Ireland. In a 1976 interview with The Sunday Independent, Barry said,

I back the right of Republicans to shoot, kill and bomb British occupying forces. Nobody can deny that. But I do not back the bombing of obvious civilian targets like pubs and that bloody carry-on...They have a perfect right to attack occupying forces, but nobody has the right to bomb civilian targets. Nobody... I wouldn't have done the Birmingham job if it was going to set Ireland free and flowing with milk and honey.

=== Memoir ===
In 1949, Barry published his memoirs of the Irish War of Independence, Guerilla Days in Ireland. It describes his Brigade's activities, such as the ambushes at Kilmichael and Crossbarry, as well as numerous other less known actions which were directed against the British Army, Black and Tans, the Auxiliary Division and the Royal Irish Constabulary.

=== Death ===
Barry died on 2 July 1980 at a hospital in Cork. He is buried in St. Finbarr's Cemetery, Cork.

== In popular culture ==
- Bobby Sands wrote a poem about Barry after his death, entitled Tom Barry. It was published posthumously in the collection Prison Poems.
- In 2011, Barry's memoirs were adapted into a four-man stage play of the same name. Written and directed by Neil Pearson, the play follows Barry's service during the First World War and War of Independence.

== See also ==
- Seán Hogan
- Seán Mac Eoin
