= Tooreen ambush =

IRA ambush during the Irish War of Independence

Coordinates: 51°47′16″N 8°36′34″W

- Part of the Irish War of Independence
Date	22 October 1920
Location	Tooreen, County Cork, Ireland
Result	IRA victory

Belligerents
Irish Republic	United Kingdom

Commanders and leaders
Tom Barry	(United Kingdom of Great Britain and Ireland) Lieut. William Alfred Dixon †

Strength
Irish Republican Army (3rd Cork Brigade)	British Army (Essex Regiment)

Casualties and losses
None	3 killed 4 wounded 6 captured IRA sources: 5 killed 4 wounded 6 captured

The Tooreen ambush (also known as the Toureen ambush or Ballinhassig ambush) was an ambush carried out by the Irish Republican Army (IRA) on 22 October 1920, during the Irish War of Independence. It took place near Roberts Farm, Tooreen, near Ballinhassig in County Cork. The IRA ambushed two lorries of British soldiers, killing three and wounding four others. The British surrendered and their weapons and ammunition were seized by the IRA. Later that night, British soldiers went on a rampage in nearby Bandon.

== Background ==
Up until the Tooreen ambush, the 3rd Cork Brigade had finished its training, but had not previously engaged in battle with British troops stationed in County Cork. The Tooreen was one of the first major ambushes carried out by the West Cork Brigade under Tom Barry.

The Essex Regiment of the British Army was deployed to West Cork and had a reputation for violently raiding houses throughout the countryside and arresting people believed to be IRA volunteers. They were also alleged to have tortured their prisoners in order to get information on the whereabouts of the flying columns, so this made them a despised enemy to the West Cork IRA.

The Essex Regiment was known to travel on the road from Bandon to Cork City every morning and return in the evenings. The road went through the hamlet of Toureen which the Third West Cork Brigade was stationed at nearby and it was decided to ambush this column of the Essex Regiment as it made its way to Cork city.

== Ambush ==
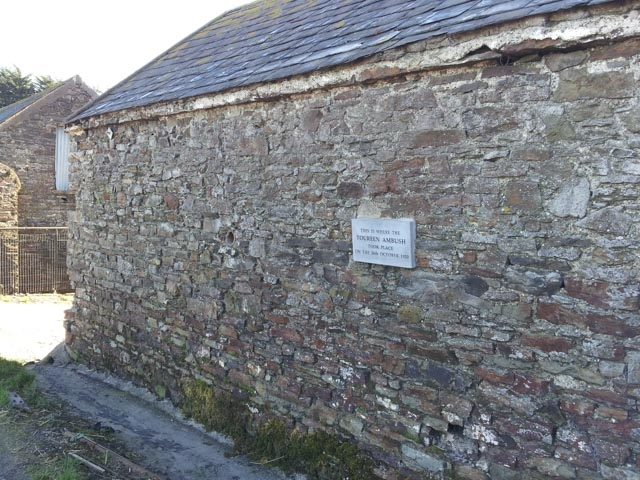
Location - farm wall 2014

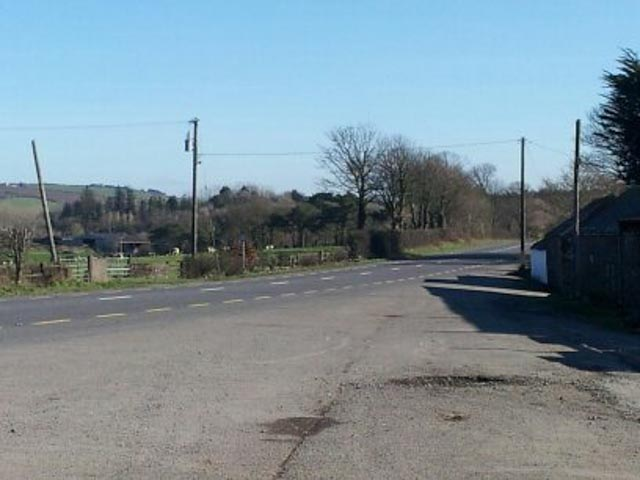
Location road past farm

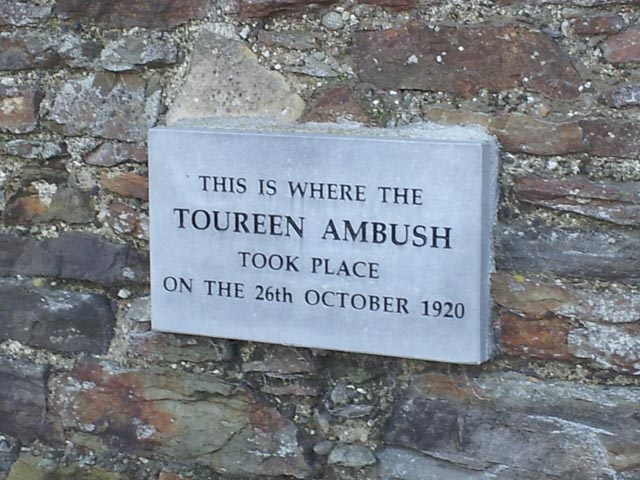
Location - plaque on farm wall 2014

Thirty-two ambushers, twenty-one being riflemen of the Third West Cork Brigade occupied ambush positions outside Toureen and lay in wait for the approaching Essex. The Essex normally went in two or three lorries to Cork City so the IRA placed a home-made mine on the road for use against them.

Scouts signalled the approach of two lorries which were coming down the road towards the ambush site. As the first lorry passed, the order to fire was given and a home-made three-pound bomb was thrown. The bomb landed inside the lorry but did not explode. The mine that was placed on the road also failed to detonate. As the volunteers opened fire, the second lorry stopped and the soldiers inside leaped out and returned fire, but the volunteers were hidden behind a large timber gate which gave them cover. The first lorry continued on to Cork Barracks. As the fight went on, the officer in command of the British troops, Captain Dixon, was shot in the head and killed as well as one of his men.

The remaining British soldiers surrendered soon after, and the IRA men ceased firing. The British soldiers were relieved of their weapons and ammunition, but otherwise unharmed. Fourteen rifles, bayonets, equipment, several Mills bombs, around 1,400 rounds of ammunition and a couple of revolvers were taken from them.

== Aftermath ==
Two British soldiers, Lt Dixon MC of the Suffolk Regiment and Pte Charles William Reid of the Essex Regiment, were killed in the ambush. Five were wounded, including Sergeant Thomas Bennett RASC who died in Cork on the following day. Six were unhurt except for shock. None of the IRA volunteers were killed or wounded during the ambush and aid was given to the wounded soldiers, while the dead were pulled away from the lorry and it was then set on fire by the volunteers. The two soldiers who were not hurt during the ambush were released along with their wounded and they returned to their barracks.

Later that night, members of the Essex Regiment went on a violent rampage through Bandon, destroying property and seeking out anyone they believed to be connected to the ambush. It is believed that at least some of the rampaging soldiers were those released unharmed by the IRA earlier in the day. The reprisal attacks were indiscriminate, and included attacks on homes and properties of business owners with "establishment" connections – including the Brennan family of Kilbrogan House.

A Military Court of Inquiry into the soldiers killed, was conducted on 28 October 1920. There are mixed references to these proceedings in the Irish Times, and the Irish Independent, both of which contained errors.

Lt. Dixon was buried with full military honours in St. Paul's Catholic Church Dover.

Sergeant Bennett was buried in St. Peter & St. Paul Church in his home village of Shorne, near Gravesend in Kent.

== See also ==
- Kilmichael ambush
- Crossbarry ambush
- Chronology of the Irish War of Independence
