= Airbertach mac Cosse =

Airbertach mac Cosse (died 1016) was an Irish poet, lector and later superior of the monastery of Ros Ailithir (now Rosscarbery), on the coast of south-west County Cork. Rofessa i curp Domuin Dúir, a poem on the geography of the world, is ascribed to him in both the Rawlinson B 502 and the Book of Leinster.
