= 3rd Cork Brigade =

Unit of the Irish Republican Army during the Irish War of Independence

The 3rd Cork Brigade, also known as Third (West) Cork Brigade, was a unit of the Irish Republican Army that operated in the western areas of County Cork during the Irish War of Independence. The unit was commanded by Tom Barry for most of the conflict and was responsible for the Kilmichael Ambush and Crossbarry Ambush. Charlie Hurley took command of the brigade during Tom Barry's illness in 1920.

== Activities ==
Under the command of Tom Barry, who later described many of the unit's activities in Guerrilla Days in Ireland (1949), the 3rd Cork Brigade was one of the most active during the Irish War of Independence. Its actions were focused on the West Cork area, and included the Kilmichael Ambush in November 1920, which resulted in the deaths of 18 members of the Auxiliary Division, and the Crossbarry Ambush of March 1921, during which the unit escaped encirclement by 1,200 British troops.

Other activities, planned by the unit, were aborted. For example, a planned attack on a Black and Tan barracks in Kilbrittain was called-off after two aborted attempts. Towards the end of 1920, members the unit planned an attack on the barracks, proposing to plant a mine against a door or wall and to storm the barracks immediately after it exploded. A "home-made" mine was made, consisting of 30 pounds of gelignite and gun cotton encased in a wooden box. On the night of 31 December 1920, and again in mid-January 1921, two attempts were made. On both occasions the mines failed to explode, and the attacks were aborted.

== Actions associated with the brigade ==
IRA victory
IRA defeat
Another result

Action	Date	Opponent	Result
Tooreen ambush	22 October 1920	British Army (Essex Regiment)	IRA victory
Kilmichael ambush	28 November 1920	Auxiliary Division	IRA victory: Column wipes out Auxiliary patrol
Kilbrittain Barracks attack	January 1921	Black and Tans	Aborted: Mines fail to detonate
Fight at Burgatia House	2 February 1921	Black and Tans	IRA victory: Column repulse Black and Tans and successfully withdraws; Black and Tan encirclement fails; Attack on Rosscarbery RIC barracks is called off
Upton train ambush	15 February 1921	British Army (Essex Regiment)	IRA defeat: IRA ambush fails; Heavy civilian casualties
Crossbarry ambush	19 March 1921	British Army; Auxiliary Division	IRA victory: Column escapes British encirclement
Rosscarbery Barracks attack	March 1921	Royal Irish Constabulary	IRA victory: RIC barracks destroyed

== See also ==
- Timeline of the Irish War of Independence
- North Longford Flying Column
