= Essex Regiment =

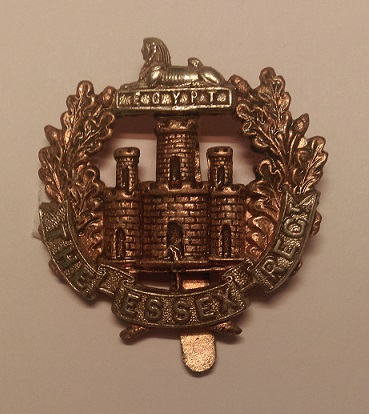
- Cap badge of the Essex Regiment.
- Active: 1881–1958
- Country: United Kingdom
- Branch: British Army
- Type: Infantry
- Role: Line infantry
- Size: Two Regular battalions Two Militia battalions, later one Special Reserve battalion Four Volunteer and Territorial Battalions Up to 23 Hostilities-only battalions
- Garrison/HQ: Warley Barracks, Brentwood
- Nickname: The Pompadours
- Motto: Montis insignia calpe (Badge of the Rock of Gibraltar)
- Anniversaries: Arras, 28 March Gallipoli, 25 April; Salamanca, 22 July Gaza, 4 November

Commanders
- Notable commanders: Edward Bulfin

The Essex Regiment was a line infantry regiment of the British Army in existence from 1881 to 1958. The regiment served in many conflicts such as the Second Boer War and both World War I and World War II, serving with distinction in all three. It was formed in 1881 under the Childers Reforms by the amalgamation of the 44th (East Essex) Regiment of Foot and the 56th (West Essex) Regiment of Foot.

In 1958, the Essex Regiment was amalgamated with the Bedfordshire and Hertfordshire Regiment to form the 3rd East Anglian Regiment (16th/44th Foot). However, the existence was short-lived and, in 1964, was amalgamated again with the 1st East Anglian Regiment (Royal Norfolk and Suffolk), the 2nd East Anglian Regiment (Duchess of Gloucester's Own Royal Lincolnshire and Northamptonshire) and the Royal Leicestershire Regiment to form the Royal Anglian Regiment. The lineage of the Essex Regiment is continued by 'C' Company of the 1st Battalion of the Royal Anglian Regiment.

== History ==
=== Origins ===
The Essex Regiment was formed in 1881 by the union of the 44th (East Essex) and 56th (West Essex) Regiments of Foot, which became the 1st and 2nd battalions respectively of the new regiment. This merger was part of the Childers Reforms of the British Army, which also saw the East Essex Militia and West Essex Militia joining the Essex Regiment as its 3rd and 4th battalions.

A large number of small Rifle Volunteer Corps had been formed in the county as a result of an invasion scare in 1859. In 1880, they were consolidated into four battalions, and in 1883 they were designated as the 1st–4th Volunteer Battalions of the Essex Regiment. Under the mobilisation scheme proposed by the Stanhope Memorandum of 1888, they constituted the Essex Volunteer Infantry Brigade, which was to gather at Warley in case of invasion.

=== Second Anglo-Boer War (1899–1902) ===
The 1st and 2nd battalions both served in South Africa during the Second Boer War. Notably, the regiment participated in the Relief of Kimberley and the Battle of Paardeberg. The four Volunteer Battalions contributed two Special Service Companies to assist the 1st Battalion and were also awarded the battle honour South Africa 1900–02.

After the war ended in June 1902, the 1st battalion was transferred to Bangalore, as part of the Madras command. 966 officers and men left Natal for India in the SS Ionian that August. The 570 men of the 2nd battalion returned home on the SS Pinemore in October 1902.

The 3rd (Militia) battalion, formed from the Essex Rifles in 1881, was a reserve battalion. It was embodied in December 1899, disembodied in October the following year, and later re-embodied for service in South Africa during the Second Boer War. 17 officers and 532 men returned aboard Cestrian, arriving in Southampton on 5 October 1902.

=== The Haldane Reforms ===
As a result of the Haldane Reforms, the regiment's militia component, which was renamed the Special Reserve, was reduced to one battalion on 1 April 1908. In addition, the four volunteer battalions transferred to the Territorial Force and were redesignated as battalions of the Essex Regiment:

- 1st Volunteer Battalion became the 4th Battalion at Ongar Road in Brentwood (headquarters since demolished)
- 2nd Volunteer Battalion became the 5th Battalion at Stanwell Street in Colchester (headquarters since demolished)
- 3rd Volunteer Battalion became the 6th Battalion at Portway in West Ham (headquarters since demolished)
- 4th Volunteer Battalion became the 7th Battalion at Cooks Terrace in Silvertown (headquarters since demolished)

The Essex Brigade joined the East Anglian Division of the TF.

In 1910, the Essex and Suffolk Cyclist Battalion, which had been raised in 1908, divided to become the 6th (Cyclist) Battalion, Suffolk Regiment and the 8th (Cyclist) Battalion, Essex Regiment.

=== First World War (1914–1918) ===
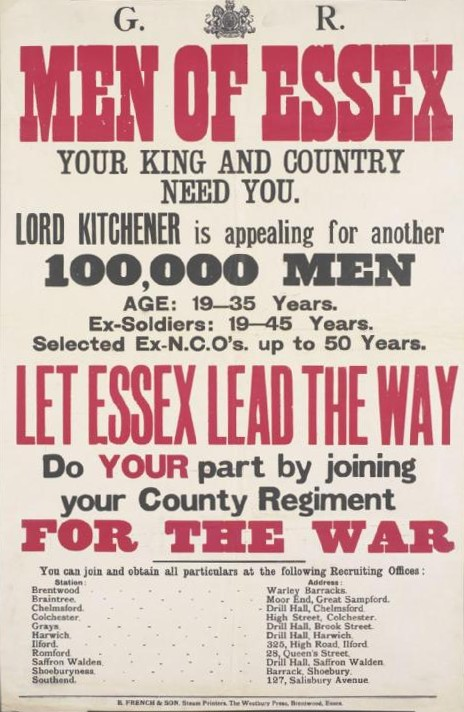
Poster calling on the men of Essex to volunteer for Kitchener's Army

During the First World War, the Essex Regiment provided 30 infantry battalions to the British Army. The 3rd (Special Reserve) (formerly Militia) battalion was mobilised to supply drafts to the two Regular battalions. On the outbreak of war, the Territorial battalions (4th-7th, and 8th (Cyclist) battalions), all formed second line (2/4-2/8th) and eventually third line (3/4th-3/8th) battalions. Three service battalions (9th, 10th and 11th) and one reserve battalion (12th), were formed from volunteers in 1914 as part of Kitchener's Army. A further service battalion, the 13th (Service) Battalion (West Ham), was raised by the Mayor and Borough of West Ham. Reserve battalions were created as the war progressed, including the 14th (from the depot companies of the 13th), the 15th, 16th and 17th (from provisional battalions), the 18th (Home Service) and 1st and 2nd Garrison Battalions.

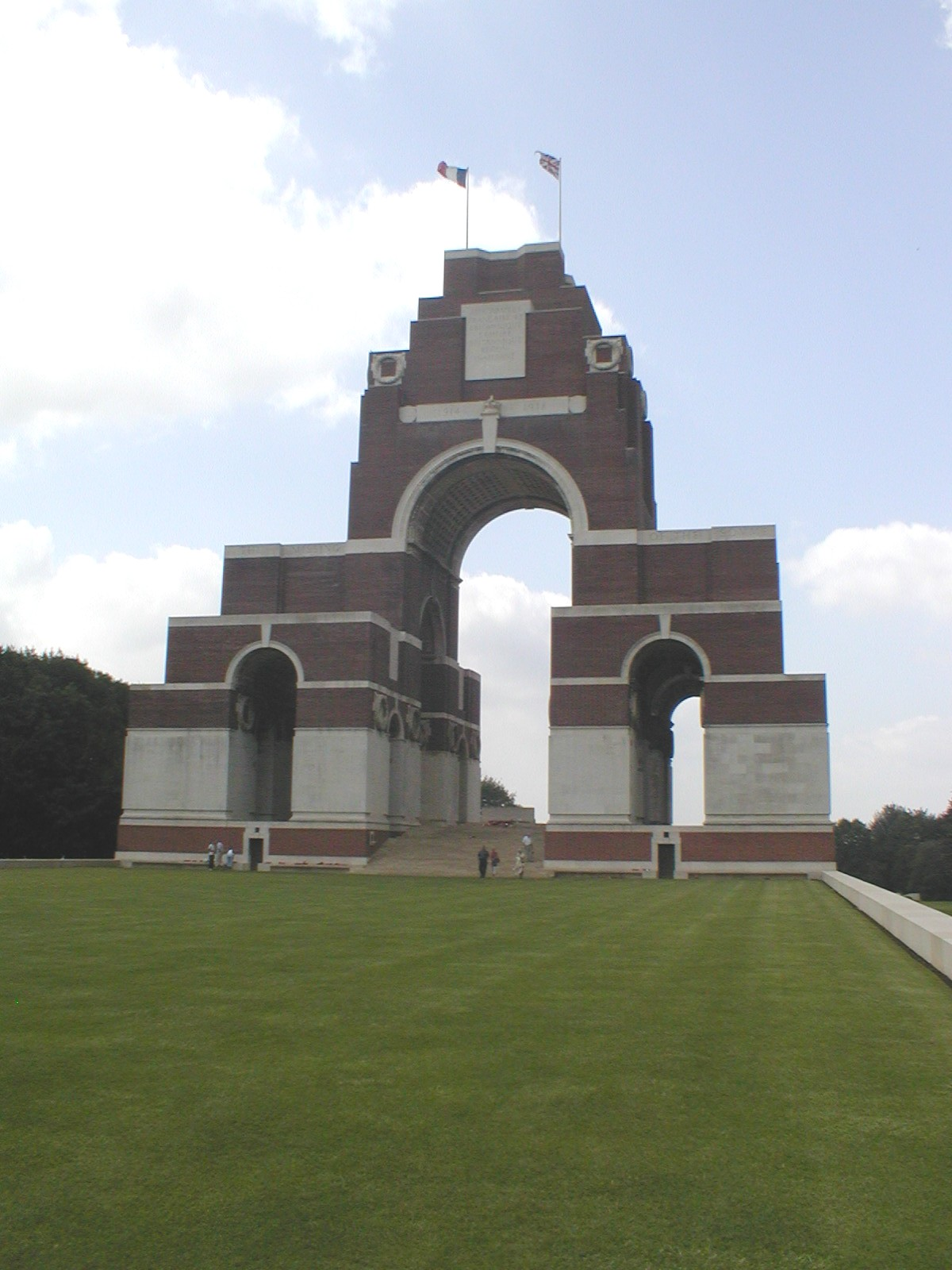
The Thiepval Memorial

==== Battle of the Somme ====
The 1st Battalion took part in the first day of the Battle of the Somme on 1 July 1916. The battalion, which comprised W, X, Y, and Z companies, took up position in the British trenches at 3:30 am. At 8:40 am, the battalion received orders to advance and clear the German first-line trenches. It was delayed by heavy enemy fire and congestion in the communication trenches. The Newfoundland Regiment advancing to the left of the Essex battalion was almost entirely wiped out as it advanced towards the German lines. At 10:50 am, the Essex companies were in position and received orders to go "over the top". The companies came under heavy artillery and machine gun fire almost as soon as they appeared over the parapet, causing heavy losses. The attack became bogged down in no man's land. The battalion received orders from 88th Brigade headquarters to recommence the attack at 12:30 pm, but at 12:20 pm the battalion commander advised brigade HQ that "owing to casualties and disorganisation", it was impossible to renew the attack. The survivors of the battalion received orders to hold their position along the line of 'Mary Redan' – 'New Trench' – 'Regent Street'.

==== Thiepval Memorial ====
The names of 959 members of the Essex Regiment are recorded on the Thiepval Memorial, commemorating the officers and men of the regiment who died on the Somme and have no known grave.

==== Gallipoli ====
"The officers of the — Battalion, Essex Regiment, with “Toby” and other canine friends", The Sphere, volume 69, issue 898, page 18.

After serving in home defence, the Essex Brigade (containing the 1/4th, 1/5th, 1/6th and 1/7th battalions and now numbered the 161st (Essex) Brigade in 54th (East Anglian) Division) landed at Suvla Bay in August 1915 in an attempt to restart the stalled Gallipoli Campaign. The four Essex battalions saw some hard fighting, but lost even more men to sickness. They were withdrawn to Egypt in December before the Gallipoli Peninsula was finally abandoned.

==== Senussi Campaign ====
As soon as it arrived in Egypt, the brigade became involved in the Senussi Campaign, marching out to replace the New Zealand Rifle Brigade guarding the coast railway from Alexandria to Da'aba. The Essex battalions were relieved from this duty on 4 March 1916 by the 2nd County of London Yeomanry and moved into the No 1 (Southern) Section of the Suez Canal Defences. In August, part of the brigade was moved northwards to counter a Turkish thrust at the canal, and was present at the Battle of Romani, though only 161st Brigade Machine Gun Company was engaged.

==== Sinai and Palestine ====
In early 1917, 161st Brigade crossed the Sinai Desert to take part in the Palestine Campaign. It was engaged at all three Battles of Gaza. At the First Battle (26 March 1917), the main attack was made by 53rd (Welsh) Division with 161st Brigade in support. Towards the end of the day the 161st Brigade was ordered to take Green Hill: despite heavy fighting the attack was a complete success and the brigade held the whole position by nightfall. However, confusion set in, and 53rd Division withdrew during the night. The men of 161st Brigade were enraged by the order to withdraw. The following day patrols showed that the Turks had not reoccupied the position; 1/7th Battalion was sent up to support the patrols, but a violent Turkish counter-attack finished the battle. Casualties were heavy, including many men missing after the fighting withdrawal.

The brigade was not heavily engaged during the Second Battle of Gaza (17–19 April 1917:) 1/7th Bn was detached and assigned to the Imperial Camel Corps (ICC), which was protecting the left flank of 54th Division, while the rest of the brigade was in divisional reserve and most of its casualties were due to shellfire.

During the summer months, 161st Brigade held the line without suffering serious casualties, and by the end of October was fully up to strength for the forthcoming Third Battle of Gaza (1–3 November 1917). On the morning of 2 November, the 54th Division put in a holding attack at the El Arish Redoubt. The fighting was confused, but the division took all its objectives. However, the 1/7th Bn found that the fourth objective, 'John Trench', was a mere scrape in the ground and could not be held. The brigade commander considered that this battalion had the hardest time of all that day. At 04.00 on 3 November, 1/7th made a renewed attempt to take their objective, but were again held up by Turkish machine-gun fire, with heavy casualties. During the rapid pursuit after the fall of Gaza, 1/4th and 1/6th Essex assisted the Anzac Mounted Division, while 1/5th and 1/7th were left marching in the rear.

As well as battle casualties, the whole brigade suffered considerably from influenza during November–December 1917 and throughout 1918. The weakened brigade was mainly engaged in line-holding until September 1918. 54th Division was held in readiness to move to reinforce the Western Front, but in the end was not sent.

The 54th Division returned to the offensive for the Battle of Megiddo (19–25 September 1918), which finally broke the Turkish resistance. To support the breakthrough, 161st Brigade was to secure the Ez Zakur line and then form a defensive flank. The brigade formed up before dawn on 19 September; covered by an overhead barrage from the machine gun companies, it took its objectives successfully. The main assault completely broke through the Turkish lines and opened the way for the cavalry to pursue the defeated enemy. 161st Brigade was left behind for a week on battlefield clearance before joining the pursuit. By the time the Armistice with Turkey was signed on 30 October 1918, 54th Division had reached Beirut.

==== Home Defence ====
The four Second Line TF battalions (2/4th–2/7th) constituted the 206th (2/1st Essex) Brigade in 69th (2nd East Anglian) Division, which remained on Home Defence throughout the war. The Third Line battalions (3/4th–3/7th) were formed as reserve battalions to provide drafts to the TF units overseas. By September 1916, they had been merged into 4th Reserve Battalion.

=== Irish War of Independence (1919–1921) ===
The 1st Battalion was stationed in Kinsale in County Cork during the Irish War of Independence.

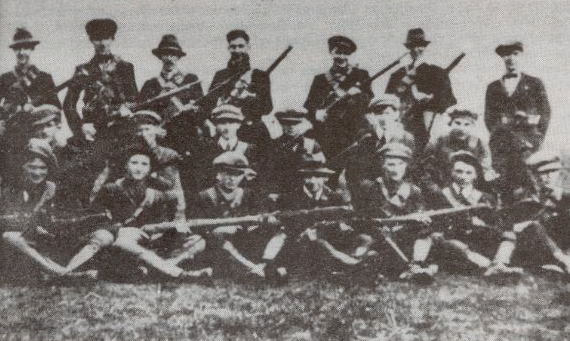
The No.2 Third Tipperary Brigade Flying Column during the War of Independence

==== Major Percival ====
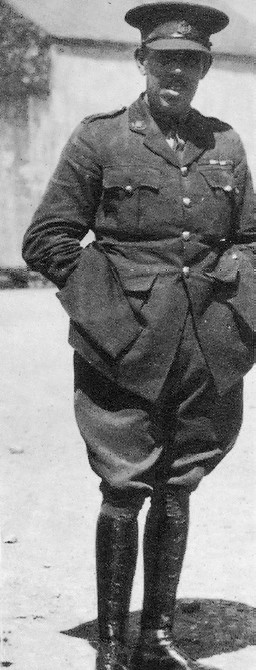
Major Percival in Ireland

From 1920, Major Arthur Ernest Percival (later a Lieutenant-General) served first as a company commander, then as the battalion's intelligence officer. During the First World War, Percival became renowned for his "power of command and knowledge of tactics".

As such, he and his fellow Essex regimental colleagues were trained in counter-insurgency tactics. Combining both intelligence and rapid response teams in mobile squads, Percival and his Essex veterans staged numerous operations to demoralise and defeat the IRA. Consequently, he and his fellow Essex men were regarded by Irish loyalists as an efficient force. This opinion of their effectiveness appears to have been seconded by the Republicans, who came to regard Percival and the Essex men as one of its primary foes. As the IRA guerrilla war intensified, a large bounty was placed on Percival's and the Essex men's death. The IRA eventually increased its bounty on Percival to £1,000, a significant sum of money for the period. Although other Essex officers were assassinated by the IRA, all attempts to assassinate Percival failed. In July 1920, the Essex Regiment captured Tom Hales, commander of the IRA's 3rd Cork Brigade, and Patrick Harte, quartermaster of the West Cork Brigade. Both men were severely beaten during interrogation - Harte suffered brain damage and died insane at Broadmoor Hospital in 1925.

Percival and the Essex Regiment were accused of committing war crimes, including terrorising civilians with violence and arson, by Tom Barry in his book "Guerilla Days in Ireland". According to Barry," This officer was easily the most vicious anti-Irish of all serving British officers". Barry further explains, that the Essex Regiment were feared due to their habit of torturing and murdering IRA prisoners. Barry states that the Essex Regiment came upon 4 IRA men (Volunteer Con McCarthy; Volunteer John McGrath; Volunteer Timothy Connolly; and Volunteer Jeremiah O' Neill) who were digging a trench across a road to sabotage British lorry routes while leaving workarounds for the local population. The look-outs left their weapons to help dig the trench across the road. The Essex regiment took them by surprise – and shot all of them through their heads.

==== Crossbarry Ambush ====
In March 1921, at Crossbarry, County Cork, the Essex Regiment encircled the IRA's "West Cork Flying Column" with 1,200 troops and soon managed to expose a company-sized element of the IRA. The IRA flying column, under the command of Tom Barry, numbered 104 volunteers. However, rather than attempting to immediately destroy this IRA element, which had been met in contact, Percival, the RIC and the Essex Regiment were ordered to link with the larger regular forces in an attempt to encircle the IRA force.

However, the delay in tempo needed to carry out this move and a lack of communications between the RIC mobile teams and the Regulars, resulted in the pressure being taken off Barry's IRA men. This allowed the IRA force to attack and overwhelm a number of isolated army positions, which appeared to create an opening out of the encirclement. Foreseeing a break-out, Percival ordered his Essex and RIC mobile teams to regroup and lay an ambush outside the opening.

Simultaneously, the larger regular force misunderstood Percival's objective and thought it saw an opportunity to destroy the entire IRA force in Cork. Consequently, it abandoned most of its encircling positions and regrouped the regulars for a single large attack on the ambush site. Meanwhile, believing his column had little chance of escaping, Barry ordered his IRA men to break out in small groups as best they could through the encirclement. Thus, in a stroke of luck, most of Barry's IRA column simply passed through the abandoned encircling army posts. A small IRA detachment did attempt to break out through the British ambush site.

However, as the RIC and Essex group were about to spring their ambush, an regular force racing to the ambush site ran into the IRA detachment and was quickly engaged. In the resulting firefight, the IRA detachment disrupted the British column and then melted away. In Barry's book, Guerrilla Days in Ireland, written in 1949, he gives a first-hand account on the Essex's collision with his flying column.

After the ambush, British forces burned farmhouses in the area and damaged property as means of venting their frustration.

Historian Michael Hopkinson concludes of the ambush, "With considerable justice, Crossbarry is regarded as victory for the IRA, but can also be seen as a missed opportunity for the British".

=== Turkey (1922) ===
At the conclusion of the First World War, Britain maintained a garrison at Constantinople to ensure the free passage of the sea lanes between the Aegean and Black Seas.

The dissolution of the Ottoman Empire and its transformation into the Turkish Republic coincided with the rise of Greek nationalism, resulting in the Greco-Turkish War. British Prime Minister David Lloyd George increased the size of the British garrison - which included the 2nd Battalion of the Essex Regiment. The garrison was withdrawn in 1923.

=== Saar Plebiscite (1935) ===
As part of the Treaty of Versailles, the Saarland province, on the border of France and Germany, was put under French control. In 1935, by the terms of the treaty, the people of the Saarland were to determine whether to remain as part of France, or to become German. The British government sent the 13th Brigade, which comprised 1st Battalion, the Essex Regiment, 1st Battalion, the East Lancashire Regiment, and the 16th/5th Lancers, as a supervisory force to the Saarland. The result of the plebiscite was 90.3% voting to join Germany (then under Nazi government).

=== Palestine (1936–1939) ===
From Germany, the 1st Battalion moved to Catterick in 1935 and thence to Palestine in 1936 where it took part in putting down an Arab revolt.

=== India (1922–1935) ===
The 2nd Battalion spent the 13-year period from 1922 to 1935 as part of the British garrison in India. During this lengthy time, the 2nd Battalion was stationed at Ambala (1922–1927), Landi Kotal (1927–1929), Nowshera (1929–1931), Nasirabad (1931–1933) and Bombay (1933–1935). The 2nd Battalion spent an additional year overseas in Sudan (1935–1936), before returning to Britain and the regimental depot at Warley near Brentwood in Essex.

=== Between the Wars ===
In 1920, when the Territorial Force was reformed (and was renamed the Territorial Army), the Essex Regiment again had five territorial battalions. However, this was short-lived, as the 8th (Cyclist) Battalion was soon disbanded.

On 15 December 1935, the 7th Battalion was converted into the 59th (Essex Regiment) Anti-Aircraft Brigade, Royal Artillery, which was retitled as an AA (Anti-Aircraft) Regiment on 1 January 1939 and as a HAA (Heavy Anti-Aircraft) Regiment on 1 June 1940.

On 1 November 1938, the 6th Battalion duplicated, forming the 1/6th and 2/6th battalions, both of which were equipped with searchlights. On 1 August 1940, both battalions were transferred to the Royal Artillery, becoming the 64th and 65th (Essex Regiment) Searchlight Regiments, Royal Artillery.

=== Second World War (1939–1945) ===
==== Regular Army ====
Of the Regular Army units, the 1st Battalion served in many different British and Indian Infantry Brigades in Sudan, Egypt, Libya, Syria and Burma. The battalion served in the 23rd Infantry Brigade, 6th Division, for a few months at the beginning of the war. Rejoining in October 1941, it remained with the brigade until mid-1945, when it joined the 29th Infantry Brigade, part of the 36th British Infantry Division. It served in Tobruk, then in the Anglo-Iraqi War as part Habforce and Kingcol, then in Operation Exporter in the Syria-Lebanon campaign, before moving to India with 23rd Infantry Brigade, part of 70th Infantry Division, previously the 6th Infantry Division, which became the core of Brigadier Orde Wingate's Special Force.

The brigade's role changed to Long Range Penetration in September 1943; the 1st Battalion formed 44 and 56 Columns of the Chindits and operated in the Japanese rear during the battles of Imphal and Kohima, two battles that turned the tide of the war against Japan in the Far East.

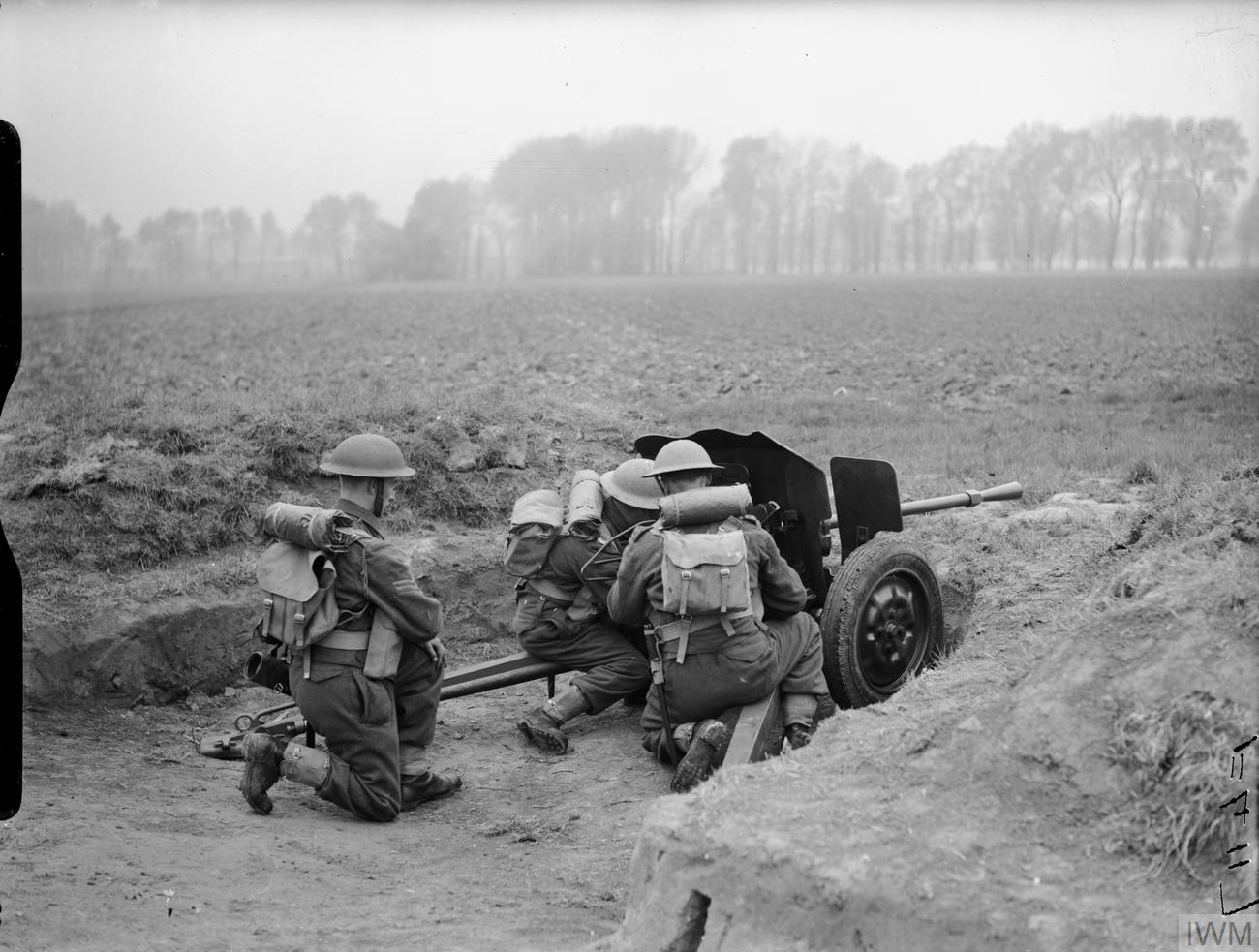
Men of the 2nd Battalion, Essex Regiment with a French Hotchkiss 25mm SA 34 anti-tank gun, Meurchin, France, 27 April 1940.

The 2nd Battalion, Essex Regiment, was originally part of the 25th Infantry Brigade (containing the 1/7th Battalion, Queen's Royal Regiment (West Surrey) and 1st Battalion, Royal Irish Fusiliers) attached to the 50th (Northumbrian) Infantry Division and served with the British Expeditionary Force (BEF) in France in 1940. The battalion was evacuated from Dunkirk after the short but fierce Battle of Dunkirk, part of the larger Battle of France.

After Dunkirk the battalion remained with the 25th Brigade until February 1944 when it became part of the 56th Independent Infantry Brigade, alongside the 2nd Battalion, South Wales Borderers and 2nd Battalion, Gloucestershire Regiment, where it was to remain for the rest of the war. The battalion received large drafts of men to bring it up to strength and began training intensively for the Allied invasion of France. The battalion and brigade landed on Gold Beach on D-Day, 6 June 1944, from roughly 1:00 pm and immediately set off inland. During the 75th anniversary of the landings in 2019, the BBC News broadcast a 15-minute dedicated testimony from 2nd Battalion veteran Eric Chardin. Interviewed by Simon McCoy, Chardin provided a detailed firsthand account of his experiences landing on Gold Beach before his subsequent capture as a Prisoner of War.

They fought through the Battle for Caen serving again with the 50th Division and briefly with 59th Division. The 56th Infantry Brigade were eventually assigned to the 49th (West Riding) Division, after the 70th Brigade of that division was disbanded due to an Army-wide shortage of trained infantrymen. The battalion and brigade would remain with the 49th Division for the rest of the war, serving mainly with the First Canadian Army. In 1945 they fought in the Second Battle of Arnhem. By the end of the war the 2nd Battalion had suffered over 804 men killed, wounded or missing, with 183 of them paying the ultimate price.

==== Territorial Army ====
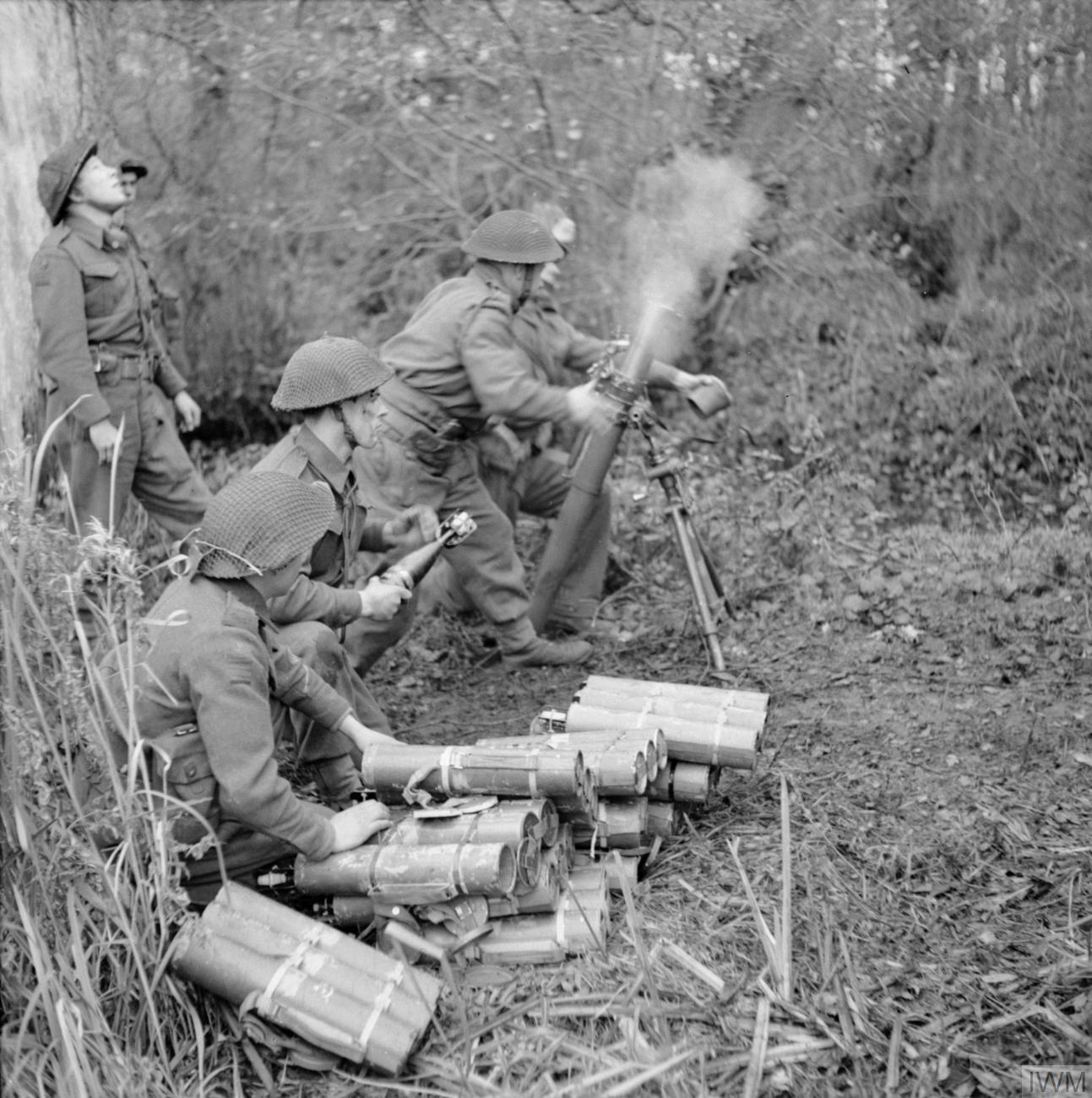
3-inch mortars of the Essex Regiment in action, Orford battle area, December 1942.

At the onset of war, the two remaining Territorial Army (TA) battalions once again raised duplicate units; all four (1/4th, 1/5th, 2/4th and 2/5th) began the war in the 161st Infantry Brigade, but the 2/4th Battalion, a 2nd Line duplicate of the 1/4th Battalion, was immediately detached to help form the duplicate 163rd Infantry Brigade.

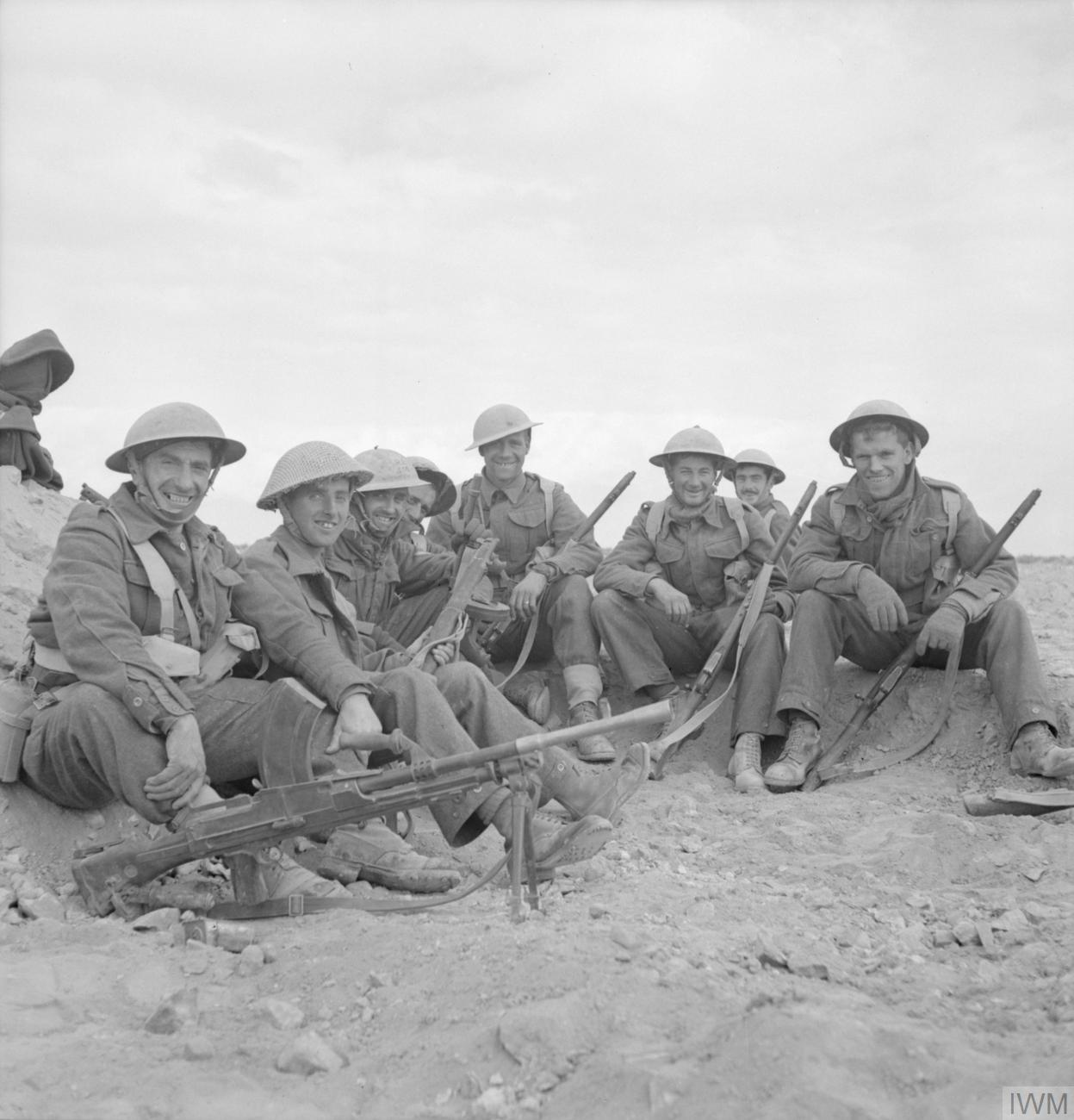
Men of the Essex Regiment relaxing at Duda, 15 December 1941.

Both brigades were initially part of the 54th (East Anglian) Infantry Division, but in January 1941, 161st Brigade was sent by sea to Sierra Leone in West Africa. In June 1941, it was sent the 'long' way around Africa by sea to join Middle East Command, where it was transferred to the British Indian Army and became 161st Indian Infantry Brigade. The 1/4th Battalion served with the 5th Indian Infantry Brigade, part of 4th Indian Infantry Division, throughout the war; the 1/5th and 2/5th battalions, which merged to form the 5th Battalion and, served with the 18th Indian Infantry Brigade, part of the 8th Indian Infantry Division.

Both battalions saw service in Palestine, North Africa and Italy; and the 1/4th Battalion served with the 4th Indian Division in action at the Second Battle of El Alamein and in the Italian Campaign before being sent to Greece to help calm the Greek Civil War. The 5th Battalion was transferred, in August 1944, to the 13th Infantry Brigade, part of the British 5th Infantry Division and was sent to participate in the final stages of the North West Europe Campaign with the British Second Army and invaded Germany itself.

The 2/4th Battalion remained in the United Kingdom throughout the war, with the 206th Brigade and later the 140th Brigade and 7th Brigade, supplying drafts and replacements to other units of the regiment serving abroad as well as other infantry regiments.

The 64th (Essex Regiment) Searchlight Regiment and 65th (Essex Regiment) Searchlight Regiment were both transferred to the Royal Artillery in August 1940, being renamed 64th (Essex Regiment) Searchlight Regiment, Royal Artillery and 65th (Essex Regiment) Searchlight Regiment, Royal Artillery, respectively. However, they still maintained their own Essex Regiment capbadges and buttons. On the outbreak of war, both were originally assigned to the 41st (London) Anti-Aircraft Brigade, part of the 2nd Anti-Aircraft Division until November 1940 when the 64th was transferred to the 40th Anti-Aircraft Brigade and the 65th remained with the 41st AA Brigade.

Both regiments remained mainly in East Anglia and eastern England, defending from aerial attacks during the Battle of Britain and during The Blitz. Towards the end of the war in late 1944 and early 1945, both regiments were selected to be converted to infantry. The 64th Searchlight Regiment was subsequently redesignated 639th (Essex Regiment) Infantry Regiment, Royal Artillery and joined the 305th Infantry Brigade. The 65th Searchlight Regiment became 607th (Essex Regiment) Infantry Regiment, Royal Artillery. Both were converted to infantry due mainly to a severe shortage of manpower in the 21st Army Group fighting in North-western Europe, particularly in the infantry.

After defending Essex during the Battle of Britain and the Blitz, 59th (The Essex Regiment) Heavy Anti-Aircraft Regiment (previously the 7th Battalion, Essex Regiment) landed in North Africa with the British First Army in November 1942, and later saw service with the British Eighth Army in the Italian Campaign.

==== Hostilities-only ====
The 7th (Home Defence) Battalion, Essex Regiment was raised specifically for home defence duties in the United Kingdom. The battalion was created on 2 November 1939 from 8 Group National Defence Companies. The battalion consisted mainly of older and less fit men but who had had previous military experience and younger soldiers around the ages of 18 and 19, and thus not old enough to be conscripted, who later went on to help form the 70th (Young Soldiers) Battalion. On 24 December 1941, the battalion was reorganised and redesignated as the 30th Battalion and remained in the United Kingdom until it was disbanded on 31 March 1943.

The 8th Battalion, Essex Regiment was raised at Warley, Essex on 4 July 1940, assigned to 210th Independent Infantry Brigade (Home) until late February 1941 when it was transferred to the 226th Independent Infantry Brigade (Home). On 1 December 1941, the battalion was transferred to the Royal Armoured Corps and converted to armour, becoming the 153rd (Essex) Regiment Royal Armoured Corps. While the men donned the black beret of the Royal Armoured Corps, they continued to wear their Essex Regiment cap badge as did all infantry units converted in this manner.

During the conversion, surplus personnel were formed into 'R' Company, Essex Regiment, which soon afterwards was designated as V Corps HQ Defence Company. On formation, 153 RAC joined 34th Army Tank Brigade, with which it fought in Normandy, alongside 107 RAC and 147 RAC. However, 153 RAC was disbanded on 28 August 1944, due to a severe shortage of manpower, to be used as replacements for other British tank units in the 21st Army Group.

The 9th Battalion was also raised at Warley on 4 July 1940, the same day the 8th Battalion was raised, and joined the 210th Brigade alongside the 8th Battalion, before both being transferred to 225th Brigade. Now assigned to the 219th Independent Infantry Brigade, the battalion was transferred to the Royal Artillery and converted into the 11th Medium Regiment, Royal Artillery on 1 December 1942, as were the rest of the battalions in the brigade. The regiment served in the Battle of Normandy as part of the 9th Army Group Royal Artillery. The regiment was disbanded after the war in January 1946.

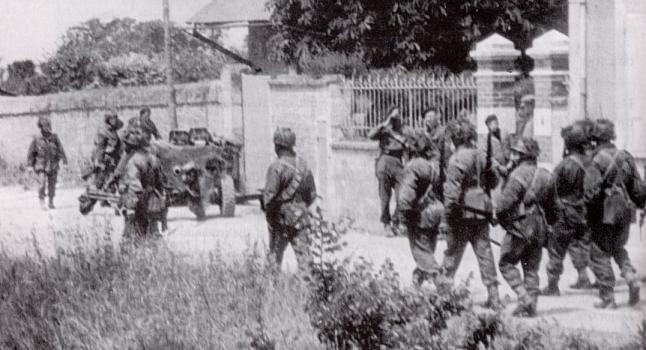
Men of the 9th Battalion, Parachute Regiment, part of 3rd Para Brigade of 6th Airborne Division, marching through Amfreville.

The 50th (Holding) Battalion, Essex Regiment was formed at Colchester on 28 May 1940. On 9 October, it was reorganised as the 10th Battalion and served in the home defence role, assigned to 223rd Independent Infantry Brigade (Home). On 8 December 1942, the brigade was converted into the 3rd Parachute Brigade and the battalion became the 9th Battalion, Parachute Regiment, part of the Army's airborne forces. Originally assigned to the 1st Airborne Division, the 3rd Para Brigade was transferred, in May 1943, to help create the 6th Airborne Division.

With most of the 6th Airborne Division, the battalion was involved in the British airborne landings in the early hours of 6 June 1944 (D-Day), code-named Operation Tonga, where the battalion had the task of destroying the Merville Gun Battery. After D-Day, they fought in the Battle of Normandy as normal infantrymen until the middle of August (see 6th Airborne Division advance to the River Seine). They later played a small part in the Battle of the Bulge in December 1944 and a large part in Operation Varsity in March 1945, the largest airborne operation of the war, involving over 16,000 paratroopers, where the 6th Airborne Division fought alongside the US 17th Airborne Division and both divisions suffered relatively heavy casualties in only a short amount of time. The 9th Battalion, Parachute Regiment ended the war in May 1945 near the Baltic Sea and was later sent with the rest of the 6th Airborne Division in Palestine.

The 70th (Young Soldiers) Battalion was formed in the United Kingdom on 16 September 1940 from the younger personnel of the 7th (Home Defence) Battalion and from young volunteers – although a person could officially join the British Army at age 18, he couldn't be posted for service overseas until he was at least 19. After serving in a home defence role, the unit was disbanded on 31 March 1943, as were all such units of other regiments, due to the British government lowering the age of conscription from 20 to 18. A 19th Battalion was also formed; it carried out line of communication duties in the Middle East and Eritrea.

=== Post-1945 ===
The 2nd Battalion was disbanded in 1948. In 1951–53, the regiment was stationed in Luneburg, Germany, as part of the BAOR (British Army of the Rhine). In mid 1953, the regiment sailed on the Troopship "Asturias" to Korea, where it served for a year. The large number of national servicemen from Dagenham and Ilford serving in the 1st Battalion earned it the nickname the Dagenham Light Infantry.

=== Merger into the Royal Anglian Regiment ===
The 1st Battalion merged with the Bedfordshire and Hertfordshire Regiment in 1958 to form the 3rd East Anglian Regiment (16th/44th Foot).

In 1964, the regiments of the East Anglian Brigade formed the new Royal Anglian Regiment. The Essex heritage continued in the regiment's 3rd Battalion (also known as 'The Pompadours'). In 1992, the 3rd Battalion was disbanded and the old Essex connection ceased. However, infantry recruits from Essex who wish to serve with others from their county are assigned to companies in the 1st Battalion, Royal Anglian Regiment. C (Essex) Company, 1st Battalion, Royal Anglian Regiment continues the Essex link.

In 1947, the 59th HAA Regiment was reformed at Walthamstow as the 459th (The Essex Regiment) (Mixed) Heavy Anti-Aircraft Regiment, Royal Artillery, ('Mixed' denoting that members of the Women's Royal Army Corps were integrated into the regiment). There were widespread mergers within the TA's AA regiments after Anti-Aircraft Command was disbanded in 1955: 459 (M) HAA Regiment absorbed 482 (M) HAA Regiment (the former 82 HAA Regiment, to which 59th had provided a battery on formation) and 599 and 600 HAA Regiments, which had been created from the 1/6th and 2/6th Btns, The Essex Regiment. A further merger in 1961, with 512 (Finsbury Rifles) and 517 (Essex) Light Anti-Aircraft Regiments into 300 LAA Regiment, saw the Essex lineage discontinued, the combined regiment later being designated 300 (Tower Hamlets) Light Air Defence Regiment.

== Territorial Army (later Army Reserve) ==
The "Essex" tradition also continued in the Territorial Army, renamed the Army Reserve in 2013. The Essex infantry reservists are now represented by 3 (Essex and Hertford) Company, 3rd Battalion, Royal Anglian Regiment.

== Battle honours ==
The regiment earned the following Battle Honours:

- From 44th Regiment of Foot: Egypt, Badajoz, Salamanca, Peninsula, Bladensburg, Waterloo, Ava, Alma, Inkerman, Sevastopol, Taku Forts
- From 56th Regiment of Foot: Moro, Gibraltar 1779–83, Sevastopol
- Havannah, Nile 1884–85, Relief of Kimberley, Paardeberg, South Africa 1899–1902
- Great War (31 battalions): Le Cateau, Retreat from Mons, Marne 1914, Aisne 1914, Messines 1914, Armentières 1914, Ypres 1915, '17, St. Julien, Frezenberg, Bellewaarde, Loos, Somme 1916 '18, Albert 1916 '18, Bazentin, Delville Wood, Pozières, Flers-Courcelette, Morval, Thiepval, Le Transloy, Ancre Heights, Ancre 1916 '18, Bapaume 1917 '18, Arras 1917 '18, Scarpe 1917 '18, Arleux, Pilckem, Langemarck 1917, Menin Road, Broodseinde, Poelcappelle, Passchendaele, Cambrai 1917 '18, St. Quentin, Avre, Villers Bretonneux, Lys, Hazebrouck, Béthune, Amiens, Drocourt-Quéant, Hindenburg Line, Havrincourt, Épéhy, St Quentin Canal, Selle, Sambre, France and Flanders 1914–18, Helles, Landing at Helles, Krithia, Suvla, Landing at Suvla, Scimitar Hill, Gallipoli 1915–16, Rumani, Egypt 1915–17, Gaza, Jaffa, Megiddo, Sharon, Palestine 1917–18
- Second World War: St. Omer-La Bassée, Tilly sur Seulles, Le Havre, Antwerp-Turnhout Canal, Scheldt, Zetten, Arnhem 1945, North-West Europe 1940 '44-45, Abyssinia 1940, Falluja, Baghdad 1941, Iraq 1941, Palmyra, Syria 1941, Tobruk 1941, Belhamed, Mersa Matruh, Defence of Alamein Line, Deir el Shein, Ruweisat, Ruweisat Ridge, El Alamein, Matmata Hills, Akarit, Enfidaville, Djebel Garci, Tunis, Ragoubet Souissi, North Africa 1941–43, Trigno, Sangro, Villa Grande, Cassino I, Castle Hill, Hangman's Hill, Italy 1943-44, Athens, 1944–45, Kohima, Chindits 1944, Burma 1943–45

== Recipients of the Victoria Cross ==
The following members of the Essex Regiment have been awarded the Victoria Cross according to The Essex Regiment Museum:

- McDougall, John - ribbon and bar held at Essex Regiment Museum
- McWheeney, William - medal held at Essex Regiment Museum
- Newman, Augustus Charles - Ashcroft Collection
- Parsons, Francis Newton - medal held at Essex Regiment Museum
- Rogers, Robert Montresor - not publicly held
- Wearne, Frank Bernard - Ashcroft Collection

== Regimental Colonels ==
Colonels of the regiment were:

- 1881–1883 (1st Battalion): Gen. Sir Thomas Reed, GCB (ex 44th Foot)
- 1881–1889 (2nd Battalion): Gen. Henry William Breton (ex 56th Foot)
- 1883–1896: Gen. Sir Charles William Dunbar Staveley
- 1896–1897: Gen. Sir Archibald Alison Bt, GCB
- 1897–1904: Lt-Gen. Hon. John Jocelyn Bourke, CB
- 1904–1929: Maj-Gen. Francis Ventris, CB
- 1929–1935: Maj-Gen. John Cartwright Harding-Newman, CB, CMG
- 1935–1946: Lt-Gen. Sir Geoffrey Weston Howard, KCB, CMG, DSO
- 1946–1950: Brig. Graham Horace Wilmer, DSO, MC
- 1950–1958: Brig. Charles Morgan Paton, CVO, CBE
- 1956: Regiment amalgamated with The Bedfordshire and Hertfordshire Regiment to form 3rd East Anglian Regiment (16th/44th Foot)

== Traditions and legacy ==
=== Uniform and insignia ===
The Essex Regiment's nickname of the Pompadours (or Saucy Pompeys) derives from its unique "Rose Pompadour" facing colour. In the UK the term Rose Pompadour is applied to a dark red-purple equivalent to maroon. This Rose Pompadour colour, which was inherited from the 56th Foot, was originally described as "deep crimson" and later likened to dull crimson and puce.

In practice the exact shade would come to vary and evolve due to such as weathering and the nature of the dyes available. From 1881 the standard white facings of English non-royal regiments were in use but the historic pompadour was later readopted. In other respects the regiment followed the normal progression from red coats, to scarlet tunics, to khaki service dress and battledress, of the British line infantry.

The cap badge, which features a representation of Gibraltar Castle, also derives from the 56th Foot, who defended Gibraltar against the French and Spanish during the American War of Independence.

From 1902 the regiment used a representation of an Eagle on its dress uniform and mess uniform buttons, and also on the badge placed on the mess uniform collar. The Eagle represented the French Imperial Eagle captured by the 44th during the Battle of Salamanca in 1812. From 1936 facings (collars, cuffs and lapels) of the mess uniform reverted from army's standardised white (introduced in 1881) to the Pompadour colour that had been used by the 56th.

=== Essex Regiment Chapel ===
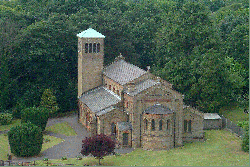
Essex Regiment Chapel, Warley, Essex

The Essex Regiment Chapel is located in Eagle Way, Warley (51.5991°N 0.2977°E). The chapel was built in 1857 and is a Grade II listed building. It was originally constructed for the British East India Company, but with the establishment of the Essex Regiment Depot at Warley, the chapel became the regiment's "home" church. The chapel's interior contains displays of regimental history, memorials, heraldry, and old regimental colours. The chapel is open by appointment, and on regimental heritage days.

The chapel is near the Warley (Brentwood) Army Reserve drill hall, which is the headquarters of 124 Petroleum Squadron, part of the Royal Logistic Corps' 151 (London) Transport Regiment.

The site of the old regimental depot and barracks at Warley is now the headquarters of the Ford Motor Company in the UK. Most of the barracks have been demolished and only the chapel, the officer's mess (now the Marillac Nursing Home) and one of the regimental gyms (Keys Hall), remain.

=== Regimental museum ===
The Essex Regiment Museum is based at Oaklands Park in Chelmsford.
