= Guerrilla Days in Ireland =

War memoir by Tom Barry

- First edition (publ. Irish Press Limited)
- Author: Tom Barry
- Original title: Guerilla Days in Ireland
- Language: English
- Genre: Memoir
- Set in: County Cork, 1919–21
- Publisher: The Irish Press
- Publication date: 1949
- Publication place: Ireland
- Media type: Print: hardback
- Pages: 228
- OCLC: 745575
- Dewey Decimal: 941.5
- LC Class: DA962 .B3

Guerrilla Days in Ireland (in some editions spelled "Guerilla") is a book published by Irish Republican Army leader Tom Barry in 1949. The book describes the actions of Barry's Third West Cork Brigade during the Anglo-Irish War, such as the ambushes at Kilmichael and Crossbarry, as well as numerous other less known attacks made by the Brigade against the British Army, Black and Tans, Auxiliary Division and the Royal Irish Constabulary. The text was originally serialised in The Irish Press in 1948 before being published as a book.

== The author ==
Tom Barry, born in County Kerry while Ireland was still part of the United Kingdom, joined the Royal Field Artillery as a teenager in search of adventure. In his memoirs he states that he had, at this point, no interest in Home Rule or any political motives. Reading about the 1916 Easter Rising while in serving in Iraq was a transformational moment, although he continued to serve until the end of World War I and was initially proud of this service upon his return to Ireland.

Guerilla Days In Ireland describes his activity during Ireland's War of Independence but waited a quarter of a century before committing these memoirs to print and publication. In the intervening years he had disappointing and frustrating experiences in Ireland's Civil War, its aftermath, and "The Emergency". In particular, the events leading up to World War II and complications associated with Irish neutrality saw him taking the risk of engaging with German officials only to have these agreements overridden by the IRA Army Convention.

In 1946, Barry ran unsuccessfully as an Independent candidate in the Cork Borough by-election, receiving the lowest number of first preference votes. His next project, a memoir about the underdog story of his involvement in the guerrilla campaign against the Black and Tans in the War of Independence, would be an attempt to repair his reputation.

== The Text ==
"FOR me it began in far-off Mesopotamia, now called Iraq, that land of Biblical names and history, of vast deserts and date groves, scorching suns and hot winds, the land of Babylon, Baghdad and the Garden of Eden, where the rushing Euphrates and the mighty Tigris converge and flow down to the Persian Gulf. It was there, in that land of the Arabs, then a battleground for the two contending imperialistic armies of Britain and Turkey, that I awoke to the echoes of guns being fired in the capital of my own country, Ireland. It was a rude awakening, guns being fired at the people of my own race by soldiers of the same army with which I was serving. The echo of these guns in Dublin was to drown into insignificance the clamour of all other guns during the remaining two and a half years of war".

In Guerilla Days in Ireland Tom Barry describes the evolution of his own thinking (from a British soldier to an Irish revolutionary) to the setting up of the West Cork Flying Column (a volunteer force never exceeding 310 fighters), its training, and its plan of campaign.

== Reception ==
Guerilla Days in Ireland was serialised in The Irish Press prior to publication and was already generating discussion in the letters pages of Irish newspapers before the release of the book. The book was a commercial success and favourably reviewed, with the Examiner writing "if other leaders of the period make equal contributions to the story of the time in which they were engaged in militant or political activities, writers of the future when history can be written with more detachment than at present.- will have an amount of valuable material written by " men on the spot." A story by a man on the spot is always more valuable than second evidence". The Tuam Herald's review stated that it "deserves a prominent place on every Irish bookshelf".

== In other media ==
The book was adapted into a play of the same in 2012.
