= History of Cork =

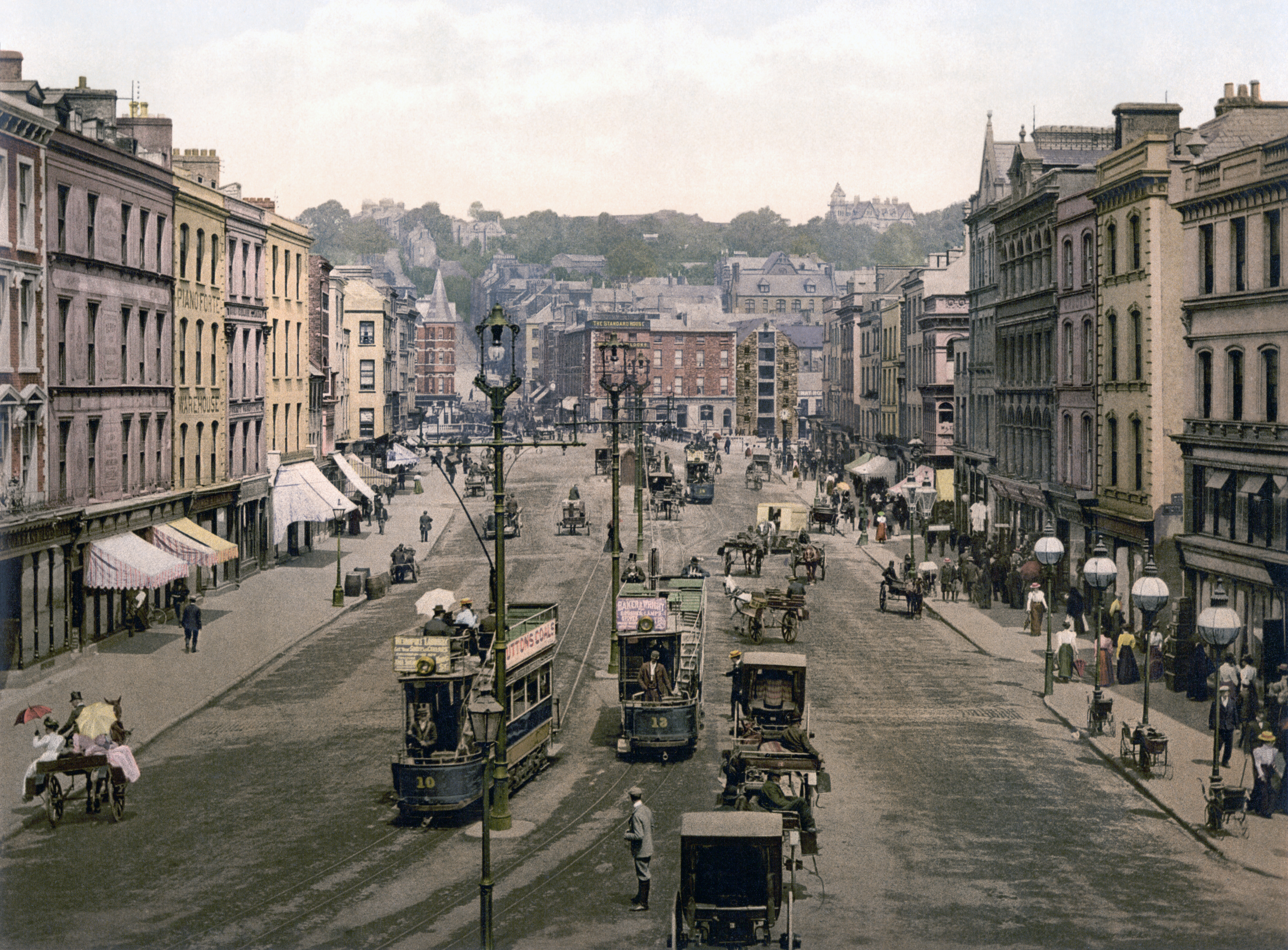
Patrick Street, Cork. Photochrom print c. 1890–1900

Cork, located on Ireland's south coast, is the second largest city within the Republic of Ireland after Dublin and the third largest on the island of Ireland after Dublin and Belfast. Cork City is the largest city in the province of Munster. Its history dates back to the sixth century.

== Origins ==
Historical population
Year	Pop.	±%
1659	4,826	—
1813	64,394	+1234.3%
1821	100,658	+56.3%
1831	107,016	+6.3%
1841	80,720	−24.6%
1851	82,625	+2.4%
1861	79,594	−3.7%
1871	78,642	−1.2%
1881	80,124	+1.9%
1891	75,345	−6.0%
1901	76,122	+1.0%
1911	76,673	+0.7%
1926	78,490	+2.4%
1936	93,322	+18.9%
1946	89,877	−3.7%
1951	112,009	+24.6%
1956	114,428	+2.2%
1961	115,689	+1.1%
1966	125,283	+8.3%
1971	134,430	+7.3%
1979	138,267	+2.9%
1981	136,344	−1.4%
1986	133,271	−2.3%
1991	127,253	−4.5%
1996	127,187	−0.1%
2002	123,062	−3.2%
2006	119,418	−3.0%
2016	125,657	+5.2%
2019	210,000	+67.1%

Cork began as a monastic settlement, founded by St Finbar in the sixth century. However the ancestor of the modern city was founded between 915 and 922, when Viking settlers established a trading community. The Viking leader Ottir Iarla is particularly associated with raiding and conquests in the province of Munster. The Cogad Gáedel re Gallaib connects this with the earliest Viking settlement of Cork. The Norse phase of Cork's history left a legacy of family names, such as Cotter and Coppinger, peculiar to Cork which are claimed to have Norse origins. In the twelfth century, this settlement was taken over by invading Anglo-Norman settlers. The Norsemen of Cork fought against the Norman incomers, mounting an expedition of 32 ships against them in 1173, which was defeated in a naval battle. Cork's city charter was granted by Prince John in 1185. Over the centuries, much of the city was rebuilt, time and again, after numerous fires. The city was at one time fully walled, and several sections and gates remain. The title of Mayor of Cork was established by royal charter in 1318, and the title was changed to Lord Mayor in 1900.

== Settler outpost ==
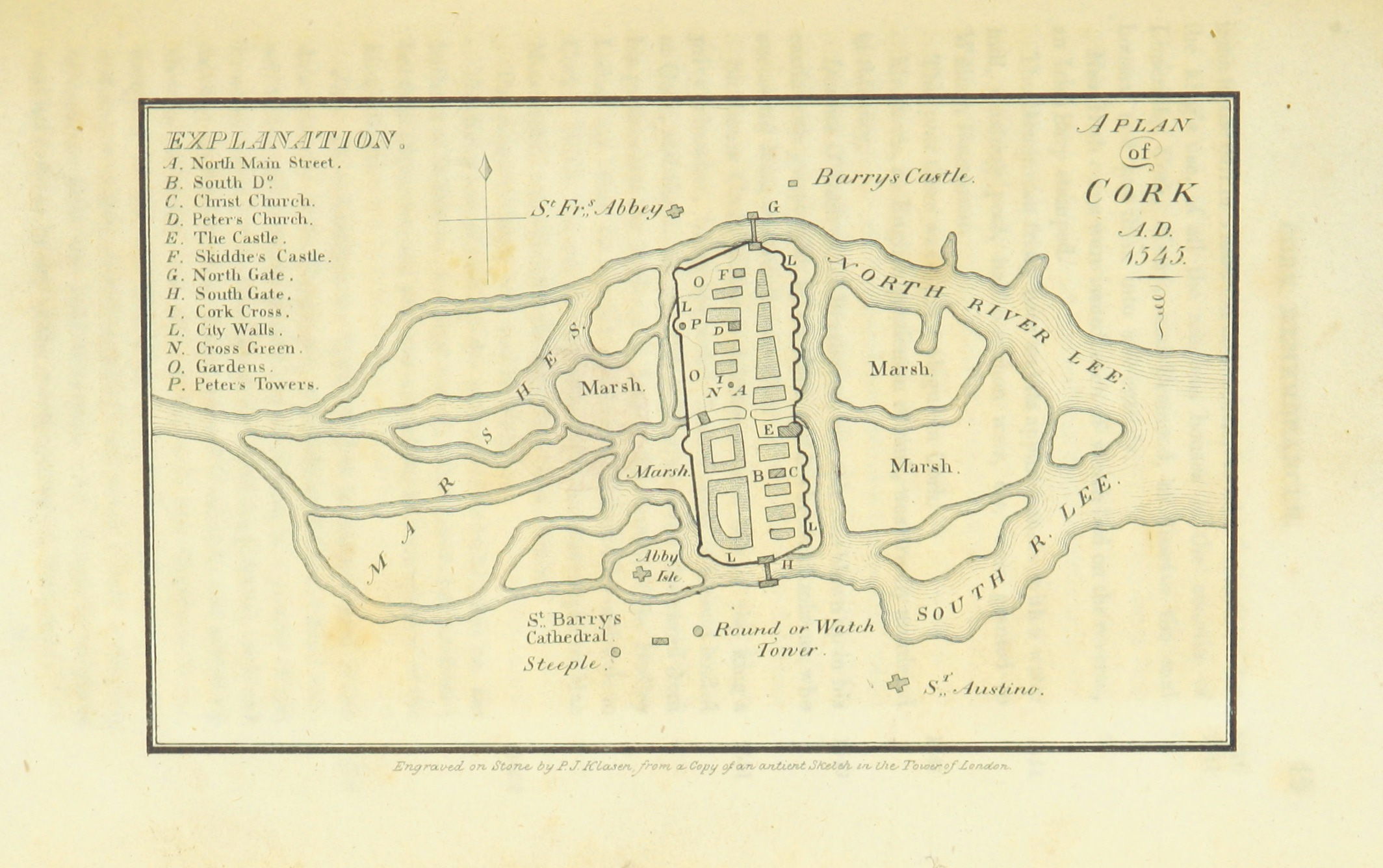
Map of Cork in 1545

For much of the Middle Ages, Cork city was an outpost of Old English culture in the midst of a predominantly hostile Gaelic countryside and cut off from the English government in the Pale around Dublin. Neighbouring Gaelic and Hiberno-Norman lords extorted "Black Rent" from the citizens to keep them from attacking the city. The Cork municipal government was dominated by about 12–15 merchant families, whose wealth came from overseas trade with continental Europe – in particular the export of wool and hides and the import of salt, iron and wine.

The medieval population of Cork was about 2,000. It suffered a severe blow in 1349 when almost half the townspeople died of bubonic plague when the Black Death arrived. In 1491 Cork played a part in the English Wars of the Roses when Perkin Warbeck a pretender to the English throne, landed in the city and tried to recruit support for a plot to overthrow Henry VII of England. The former mayor of Cork John Atwater and several important citizens went with Warbeck to England but when the rebellion collapsed they were all captured and executed. Cork's nickname of the 'rebel city' originates in these events.

A description of Cork written in 1577 speaks of the city as, "the fourth city of Ireland" that is, "so encumbered with evil neighbours, the Irish outlaws, that they are fayne to watch their gates hourly ... they trust not the country adjoining [and only marry within the town] so that the whole city is linked to each other in affinity".

== Wars of religion ==
The character of Cork was changed by the Tudor conquest of Ireland (c. 1540–1603) which left the English authorities in control of all of Ireland for the first time, introduced thousands of English settlers in the Plantations of Ireland and tried to impose the Protestant Reformation on a predominantly Catholic country. Cork suffered from the warfare involved in the reconquest, particularly in the Second Desmond Rebellion in 1579–83, when thousands of rural people fled to the city to avoid the fighting, bringing with them an outbreak of bubonic plague.

Shandon Castle (just outside the walls of the city) became the official residence of the President of Munster in the late sixteenth century. As a "centre of English administration" in the area, Cork by and large sided with the Crown in the conflicts of the period, even after a Spanish expeditionary force landed at nearby Kinsale in 1601 during the Nine Years War. However, the price the citizens demanded for their loyalty was toleration of their Roman Catholic religion. In 1603, the citizens of Cork along with Waterford and Limerick rebelled, expelling Protestant ministers, imprisoning English officials, seizing the municipal arsenals and demanding freedom of worship for Catholics. They refused to admit Lord Mountjoy's English army when it marched south, citing their charters from the twelfth century. Mountjoy retorted that he would, "cut King John his charter with King James his sword" and arrested the ringleaders, thus ending the revolt.

In 1641, Ireland was convulsed by the Irish Rebellion of 1641. Cork became a stronghold for the English Protestants, who sought refuge there after the outbreak of the rebellion and remained in Protestant hands throughout the ensuing Irish Confederate Wars. An ineffective Irish Confederate attempt to take the city in 1642 was beaten off at the battle of Liscarroll. In 1644, Murrough O'Brien, Earl Inchiquinn, the commander of English forces in Cork, expelled the Catholic townsmen from the city. Although most of them went no further than the city's suburbs, this was the beginning of Protestant domination of the city that would last for nearly two centuries. The population of Cork by this times was around 5,000, most of whom lived outside the city walls.

In 1649–53, Ireland was re-conquered by an English Parliamentarian army under Oliver Cromwell. Inchiquin had briefly led Cork into an alliance with the Confederates, in 1648, but the garrison changed sides again in 1650, going over to English Parliamentarian side under the influence of Roger Boyle, 1st Earl of Orrery.

In 1690 during the Williamite war in Ireland, Cork was besieged and taken for the Williamites by an English army under John Churchill, 1st Duke of Marlborough.

== Eighteenth-century Cork ==
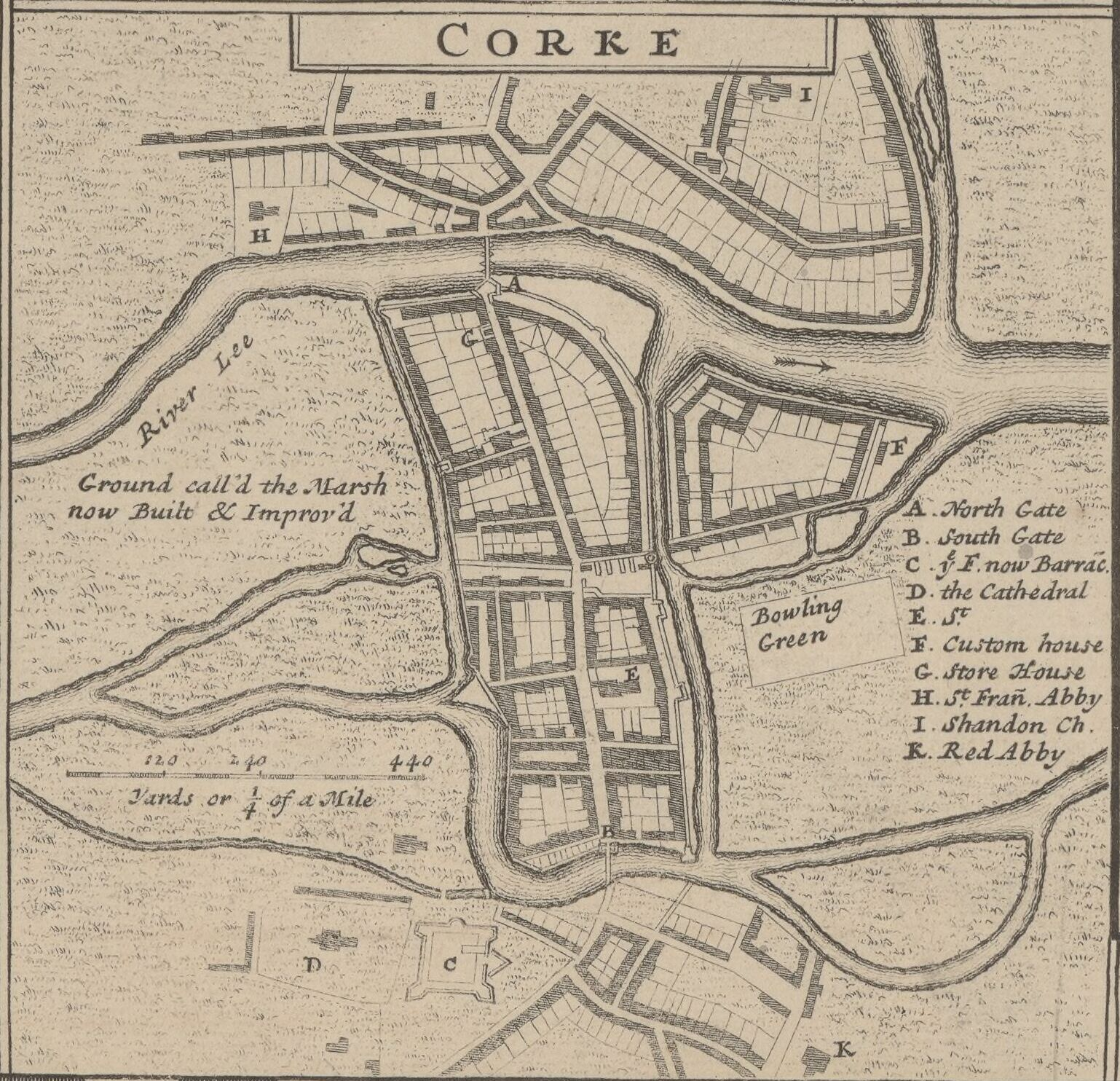
Herman Moll's map of early 18th-century Cork ("Corke"), highlighting its churches, abbeys, and English fortifications

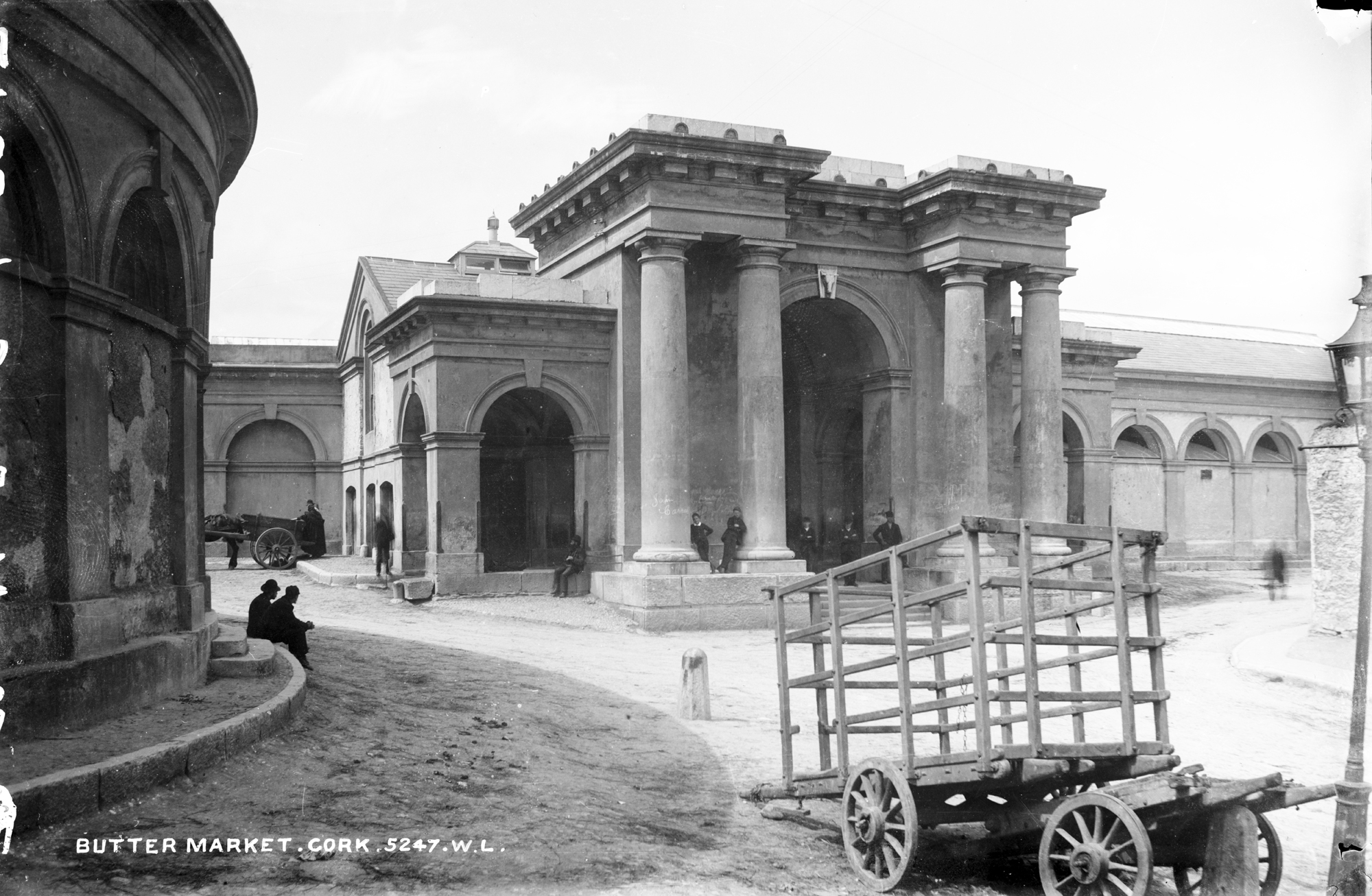
Cork Butter Exchange (pictured c. 1900) was among the largest of its kind worldwide

In the late seventeenth and early eighteenth centuries French Protestants (Huguenots) arrived in Cork fleeing from religious persecution at the hands of Louis XIV of France. Their influence can still be seen in the names of the Huguenot Quarter and French Church Street. Many new buildings were erected in Cork in the eighteenth century. Like Dublin, much of Cork's medieval architecture was replaced by neo-classical Georgian buildings. Examples of this include, Christ Church (1720–26), St Anne's Shandon (1722–26) and a Customs House (1724). During the eighteenth century, trade in Cork's port expanded considerably. Cork merchants exported large amounts of butter and beef to Britain, France and the Caribbean, where it was used to support the development of sugar plantations and slavery.

== Population explosion, famine and emigration ==
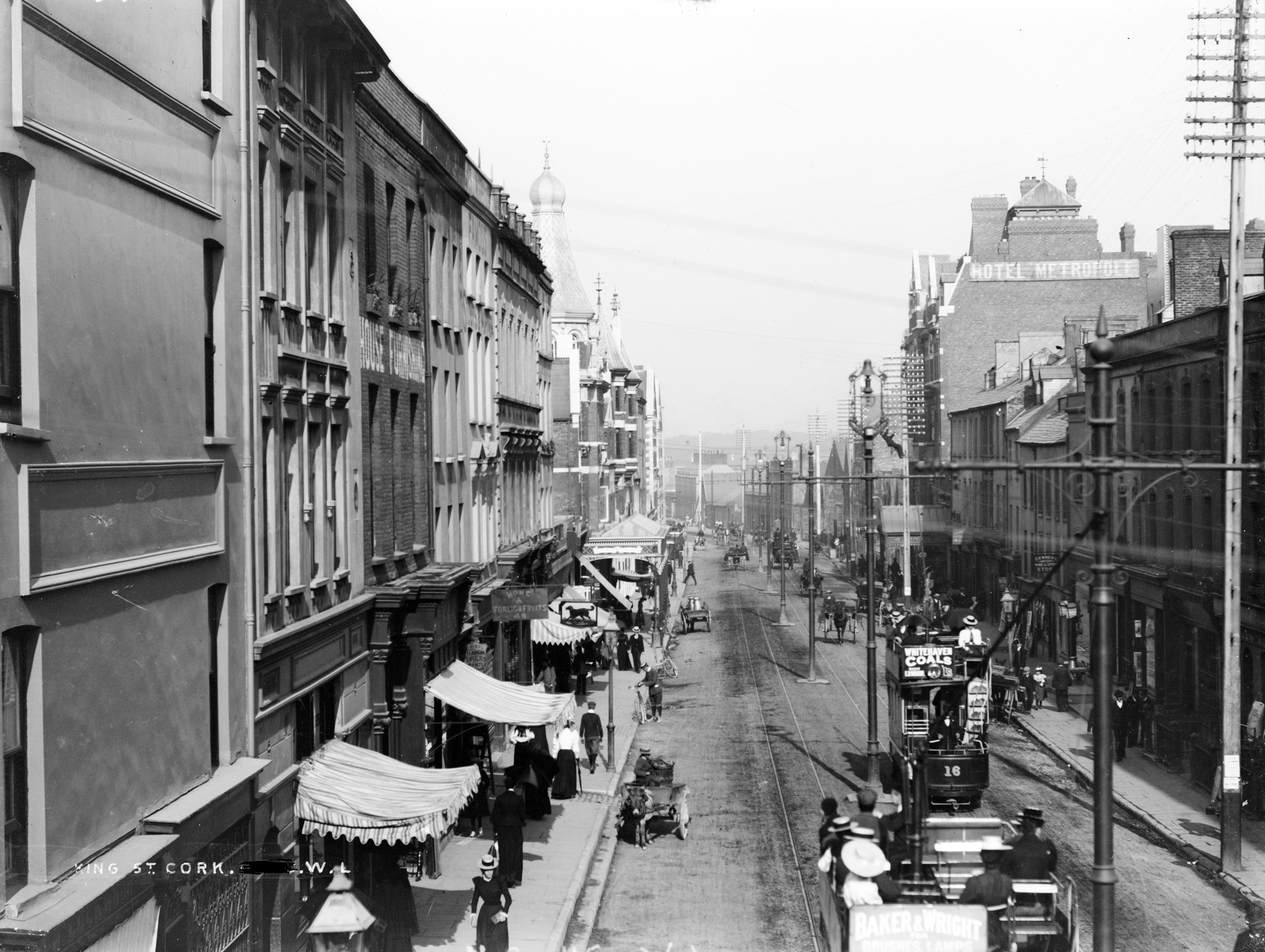
King Street, now MacCurtain Street), c. 1900

During the early nineteenth century the population of Cork expanded. By mid-century Cork had a population of about 80,000. The increase was due to migration from the countryside as people fled from poverty and in the 1840s, a terrible famine. This led to extremes of poverty and overcrowding in Cork city during this century. Another effect of this influx was to reverse the denominational character of the city, which became predominantly Catholic again.

However, in the later nineteenth century the population of Cork declined slightly due to emigration, principally to Britain or North America. In 1825, over 1,800 Irish residents departed from Cork to emigrate to Peterborough, Ontario, Canada assisted by Peter Robinson (who organised the scheme on behalf of the British Government). This resulted in the area known as "Scott's Plains" being renamed "Peterborough" as a tribute. Cork and also nearby Cobh became major points of departure for Irish emigrants, who left the country in great numbers after the Great Irish Famine of the 1840s.

During the nineteenth and early twentieth century important industries in Cork included brewing, distilling, wool and shipbuilding. In addition, there were some municipal improvements such as gas light street lights in 1825, two local papers, the Cork Constitution published from 1823 and the Cork Examiner, first published in 1841 and, very importantly for the development of modern industry, the railway reached Cork in 1849. Also in 1849, University College Cork opened.

Much nineteenth-century architecture can still be seen in many areas around the city such as the neo-Georgian and Victorian buildings that now house banks and department stores. The Victorian influence on the city is noticeable in place names such as Victoria Cross (after Queen Victoria), Albert Quay (after Prince Albert), Adelaide Street (after Queen Adelaide) and the Victoria Hospital on the Old Blackrock Road.

Since the nineteenth century, Cork had been a predominantly Irish nationalist city, with widespread support for Irish Home Rule and the Irish Parliamentary Party, but from 1910 stood firmly behind William O'Brien's dissident All-for-Ireland Party. O'Brien published a third local newspaper, the Cork Free Press.

== War of Independence ==
Following the outbreak of World War I in 1914 many of Cork's National Volunteers enlisted to serve with the Royal Munster Fusiliers, suffering heavy casualties both in Gallipoli and on the Western Front. In the period 1916–1923, Cork was embroiled in a conflict between Irish nationalists and the British state in Ireland. The turmoil of this period ultimately led to substantial Irish independence for 26 of the 32 Irish counties in 1922, but also to a bitter civil war between Irish nationalist factions in 1922–23.

In 1916, during the Easter Rising as many as 1000 Irish Volunteers mobilised in Cork for an armed rebellion against British rule but they dispersed without fighting. However, during the subsequent Irish War of Independence 1919–1921, Cork was the scene of much violence.

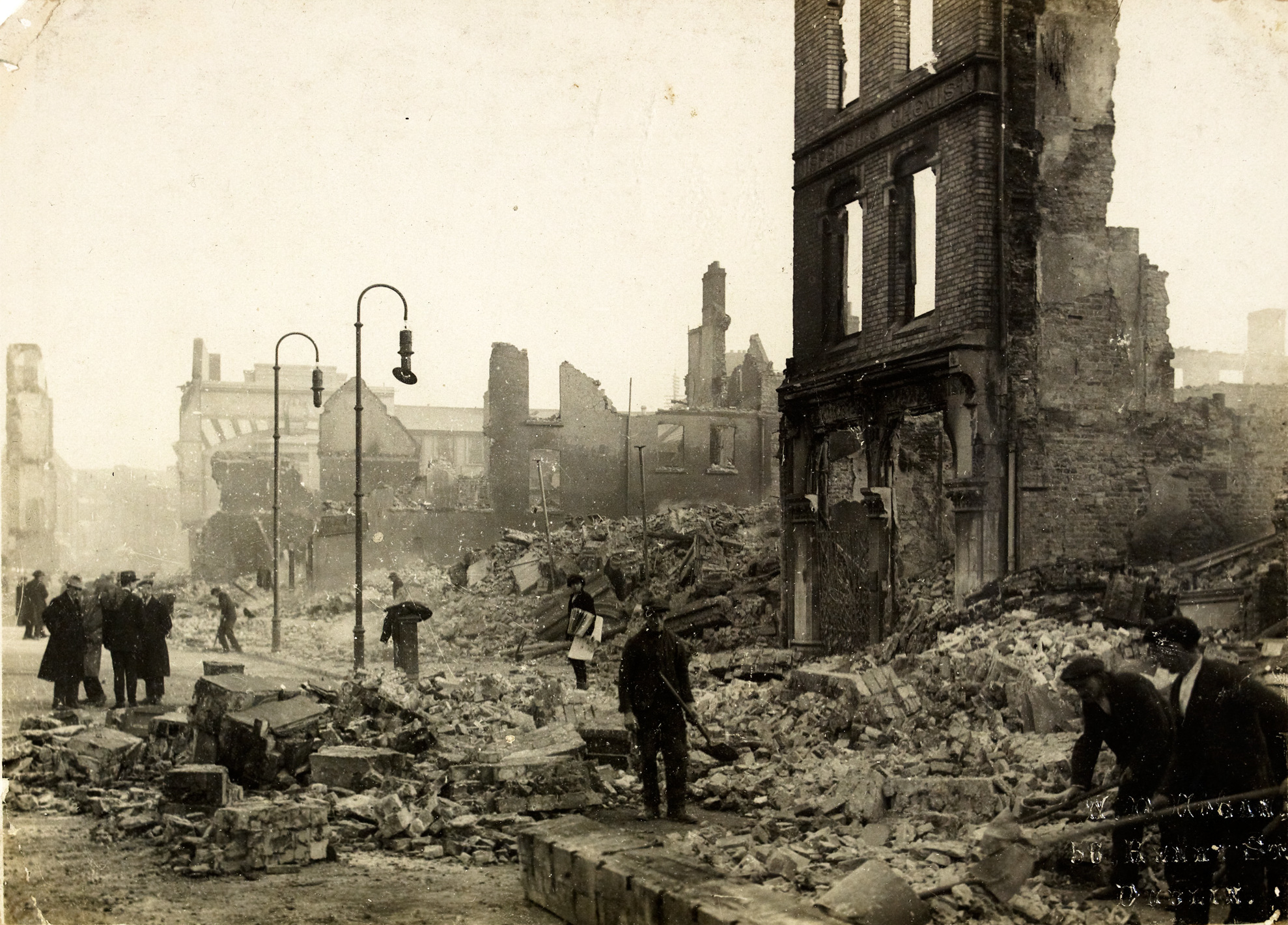
Aftermath of the "Burning of Cork" in December 1920

In particular, the city suffered from the action of the Black and Tans – a paramilitary police force raised to help the Royal Irish Constabulary combat the Irish Republican Army. On 20 March 1920, Thomas Mac Curtain, the Sinn Féin Lord Mayor of Cork was shot dead, in front of his wife at his home, by policemen. His successor as Mayor, Terence McSwiney was arrested in August 1920 and died on hunger strike in October of that year. On 11 December the city centre was gutted by fires started by the Black and Tans in reprisal for IRA attacks in the city. Over 300 buildings were destroyed and two suspected IRA men were shot dead in their beds by British forces on the night. This atrocity did not stop IRA activity in the city however. Attacks and reprisals continued in the city until the fighting was ended in a truce agreed in July 1921.

Another, highly disputed aspect of the War of Independence in Cork was the shooting of informers. Historians such as Peter Hart have written that 'enemy' groups such as Protestants and ex-soldiers were targeted at random by the IRA. Gerard Murphy's book "Year of the Disappearances" put the number of Protestants killed in Cork at 73. This thesis is disputed by other scholars such as John Borgonovo, who write that their studies suggest that the IRA's 30 or so confirmed civilian victims in Cork do seem to have been targeted because the IRA believed they were passing information to the British and not for any other reason.

== Civil War ==
The local IRA units, for the most part, did not accept the Anglo-Irish Treaty negotiated to end the war -ultimately repudiating the authority of the newly created Irish Free State. After the withdrawal of British troops in early 1922, they took over the military barracks in Cork and the surrounding area. By July 1922, when the Irish Civil War, broke out, Cork was held by anti-Treaty forces as part of a self-styled Munster Republic -intended to be a stronghold for the preservation of the Irish Republic annulled by the Treaty.

Cork however, was taken in August 1922 by the pro-Treaty National Army in an attack from the sea. The Free State forces landed at nearby Passage West with 450 troops and several artillery pieces. There was fighting for three days in the hills around Douglas and Rochestown, in which roughly 20 men were killed and about 60 wounded as the anti-Treaty IRA contested the National Army's advance into the city. However the badly armed anti-Treaty forces did not make a stand in Cork itself and dispersed after sporadic fighting, burning a number of buildings and the barracks they had been holding (for example at Elizabeth Fort and Collins Barracks).

Subsequently, they reverted to guerrilla warfare and took to destroying all the roads and bridges connecting Cork with the rest of the country. Michael Collins, commander in chief of the National Army, was killed in an IRA ambush at Beal na mBlath, west of the city on 22 August 1922.

Guerrilla warfare raged in the surrounding countryside until April 1923, when the Anti-Treaty side called a ceasefire and dumped their arms. There were attacks on Free State troops in the city, but not on the scale of the campaign against British forces in 1919–21.

== Late twentieth-century Cork ==
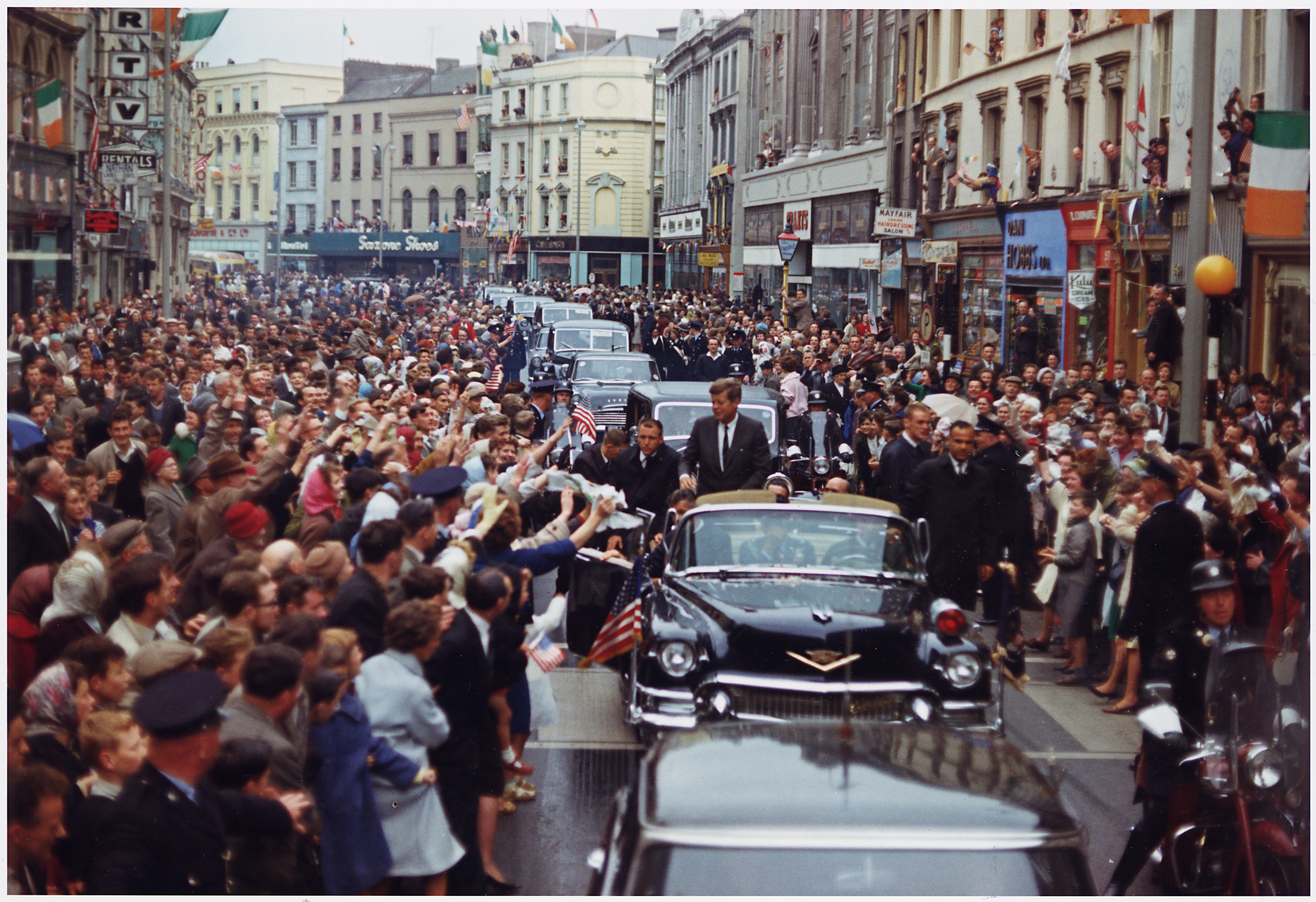
Crowds welcome US President John F. Kennedy to Cork in June 1963

In the post independence period, Cork has been acknowledged as the Republic of Ireland's second city. It has produced a number of political leaders, notably Jack Lynch – who became Taoiseach (Irish prime minister) in the 1960s. Its citizens half jokingly refer to it as the "real capital".

Cork's inner city slums were cleared by the municipal authority from the 1920s onwards, and their inhabitants were re-housed in housing estates on the periphery of the city -especially on its north side. Cork's economy dipped in the late twentieth century as the old manufacturing industries in Cork declined. The Ford car factory closed in 1984 as did the Dunlop tyre factory. Shipbuilding in Cork also came to an end in the 1980s. As a result of these closures unemployment was high in Cork in the 1980s.

However, in the 1990s new industries came to Cork. For instance, Marina Commercial Park was built on the site of the old Dunlop and Ford plants and Cork Airport Business Park first opened in 1999. Cork, like other cities in Ireland benefited somewhat from the Celtic Tiger economic boom, with growth in industries such as information technology, pharmaceuticals, brewing, distilling and food processing. The Port of Cork is also a busy and important port. Into the twenty-first century, tourism has grown in economic importance, and in 2005 Cork was named European Capital of Culture.

== Annalistic references ==
See Annals of Inisfallen (AI)

- AI774.1 Kl. Selbach of Corcach rested.
- AI792.2 Téróc, abbot of Corcach, rested in the Lord.
- AI816.2 Repose of Conaing son of Donat, abbot of Corcach.
- AI825.1 Kl. Repose of Flann son of Fairchellach, abbot of Les Mór, Imlech Ibuir, and Corcach.
- AI836.1 Kl. Entry of Feidlimid into the abbacy of Corcach.
- AI863.1 Kl. Repose of Dainél, abbot of Les Mór and Corcach.
- AI928.2 Fínnechta, abbot of Corcach, rested in Christ.
- AI951.3 Repose of Ailill abbot of Corcach.
- AI961.1 Kl. Repose of Cathmug, bishop of Corcach and abbot of Les Mór.
- AI978.3 Corcach was plundered, and Fínnechta the bishop, died.
- AI997.3 Repose of Colmán of Corcach.
- AI1001.4 Repose of Flaithem, abbot of Corcach.
- AI1028.2 Lathir, daughter of Donnchadh, died on her pilgrimage in Corcach.

== See also ==
- County Cork
- Greater Cork
- Metropolitan Cork
