= Ruth O'Hara =

Irish psychiatrist and academic administrator

- Education: University College Dublin; University of Southern California
- Scientific career
- Fields: Cognitive psychology
- Workplaces: Stanford University

Ruth M. O’Hara is an Irish cognitive psychologist and academic administrator serving as the senior associate dean for research at the Stanford University School of Medicine since 2019. She is the Lowell W. and Josephine Q. Berry professor of psychiatry and behavioral sciences.

== Life ==
O'Hara's family is from County Wicklow. She was born to Esther and Noel O’Hara. In 1919, her grandmother, Shelia Smyth Harris joined the Irish republicanism movement after her 19-year-old brother was shot by the Black and Tans. When she died in 1983, she was given a state funeral with military honors. O'Hara completed her undergraduate degree and master's degree in experimental psychology at the University College Dublin. She earned a Ph.D. in experimental cognitive psychology from the University of Southern California. Her dissertation is titled, Is Once Enough? An Investigation of Hypermnesia and Reminiscence in Young and Old Adults. Joan M. McDowd was her doctoral advisor. She came to Stanford University in 1998 to complete a postdoctoral fellowship.

O'Hara joined the department of psychiatry at Stanford University School of Medicine in 2000. She conducts neurophysiological research on age-related cognitive decline, mild cognitive impairment, and the onset of dementia. From 2016 to 2019, O'Hara was the associate chair of the department of psychiatry and behavioral sciences. She was the interim senior associate vice provost in the office of the vice provost and dean of research from 2019 to 2020. Since 2019, O'Hara has been the senior associate dean for research. She is the Lowell W. and Josephine Q. Berry professor of psychiatry and behavioral sciences.

== Selected works ==
- Hantke, Nathan; Etkin, Amit; O'Hara, Ruth, eds. (2020). Handbook of Mental Health and Aging. Elsevier Science. ISBN 978-0-12-800136-3.
