= Elizabeth Fort =

17th-century fort in Cork, Ireland

- Cork, Ireland
- Elizabeth Fort circa 1866

Site information
- Type: star fort
- Controlled by: Cork City Council
- Open to the public: Yes (Tuesday to Saturday 10-5 and Sunday 12-5)
- Website: ElizabethFort.ie

Location
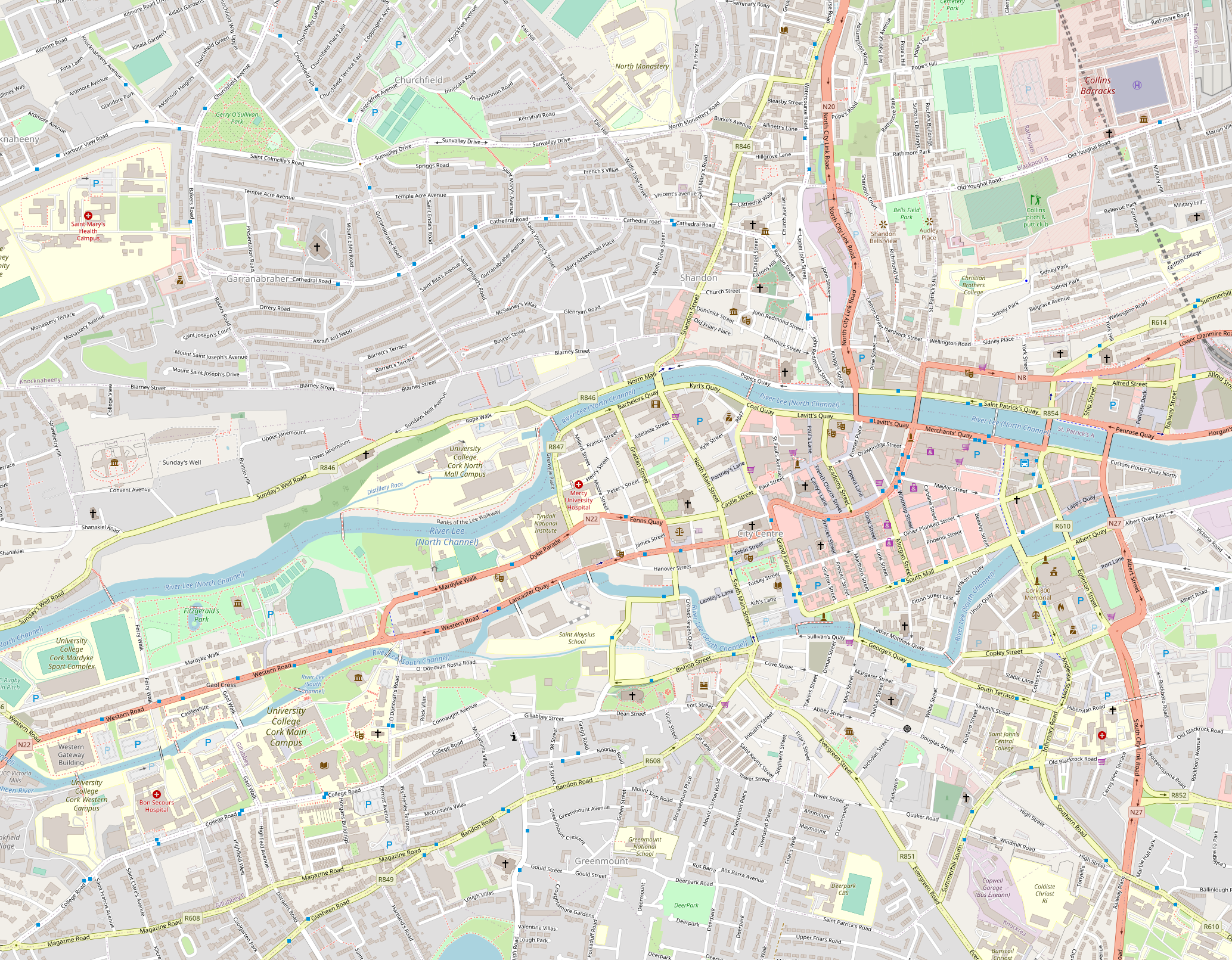
- Location within Cork Central
- Coordinates: 51.894497°N 8.477617°W
- Area: c.1.5 acres (0.61 ha)

Site history
- Built: 1601
- Battles/wars: Cromwellian conquest of Ireland 1649; Siege of Cork 1690; Irish War of Independence 1920; Irish Civil War 1922

Elizabeth Fort is a 17th-century star fort off Barrack Street in Cork, Ireland. Originally built as a defensive fortification on high-ground outside the city walls, the city eventually grew around the fort, and it took on various other roles – including use as a military barracks, prison, and police station. Since 2014, the fort has seen some development as a tourism heritage site, reportedly attracting 36,000 visitors during 2015. The walls of the fort have been accessible to the public on a regular basis since September 2014.

== History ==
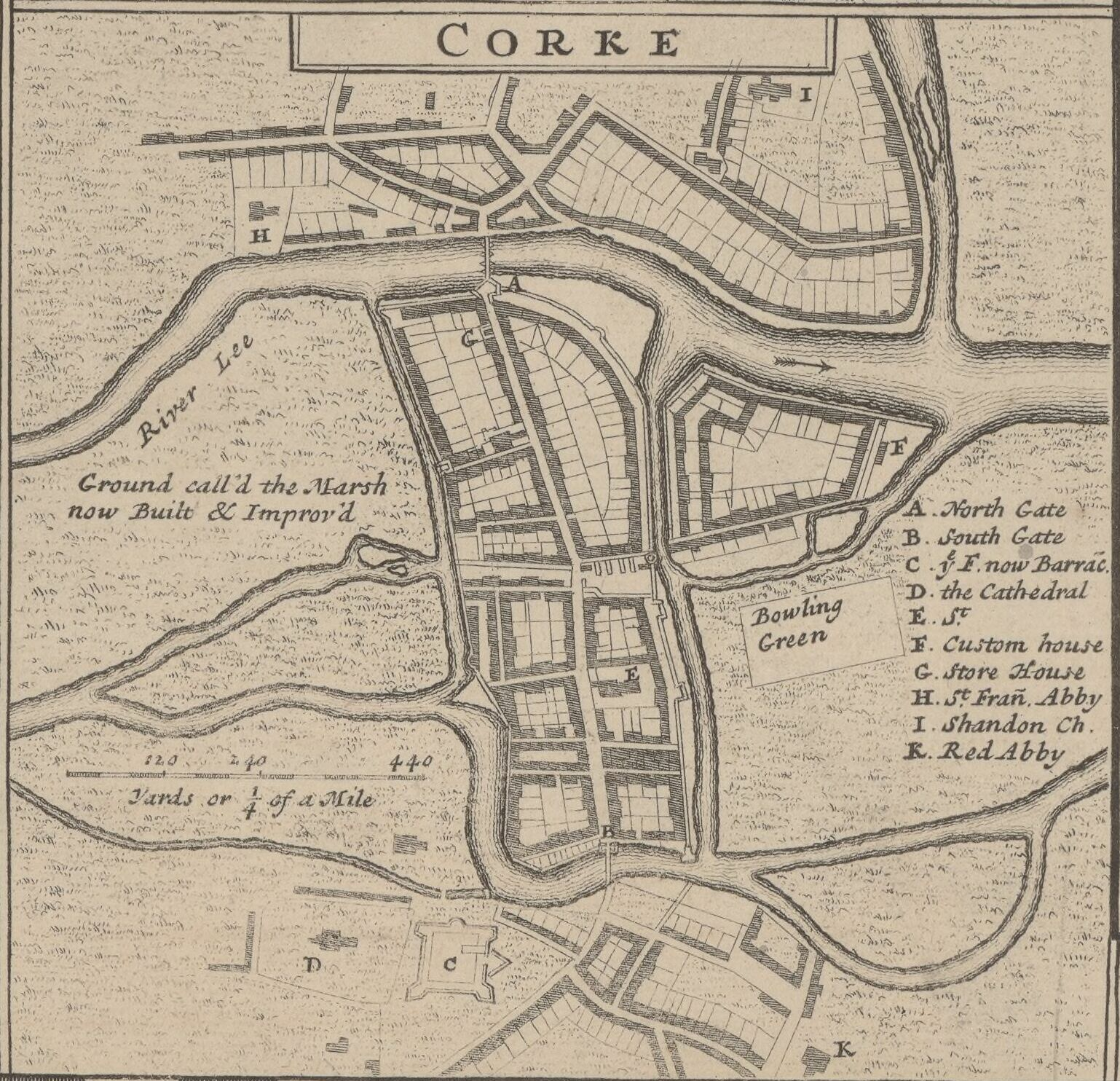
"The Fort, now Barracks" (C) on Herman Moll's early 18th-century map of Cork

Elizabeth Fort was first built in 1601 on a hill to the south and outside the medieval walls of Cork. This position was chosen because, while the city had relied on Shandon Castle and the city walls for defence since Anglo-Norman times, the development of artillery and the possibility of its deployment on the hills surrounding the city, diminished the potential effectiveness of these defences. The fort was built by Sir George Carew and named after Queen Elizabeth I.

This original fort was built of timber and earth, and within a few years was pulled down by the citizens of Cork. Fearing that the fort might be used against them by James I during the Tudor conquest of Ireland, the mayor and people of Cork demolished the fort in 1603. Cork was retaken however by Lord Mountjoy and the fort was rebuilt.

This early construction took place on the site of an existing church. This Hiberno-Norman-period church dated from at least the High Middle Ages and appears in documents and maps as "St Mary del Nard" (1199), or "Holy Cross del Nard" (1311). In John Speed's map of Cork (1610) "Holy Roe" church is marked within the walls of the (then) newly finished fort.

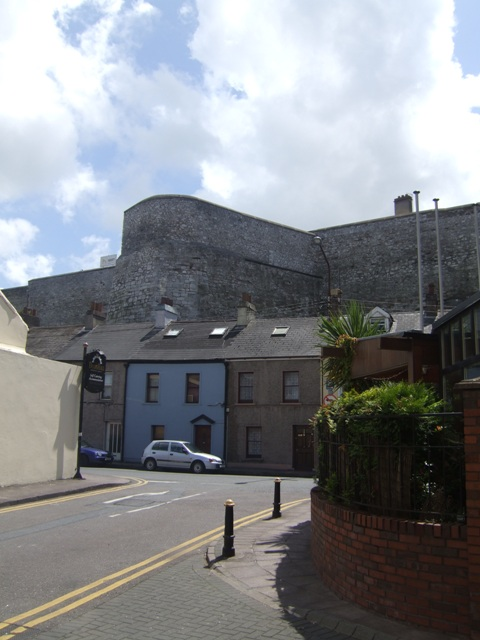
A northern wall of Elizabeth Fort on high-ground over residential city streets

The basic structure of the current fort has its basis in reconstructions dating from 1624 to 1626, and in works reputedly carried out under Cromwell in 1649. Any remnants of the previous church were removed in these reconstructions.

In 1690, during the Williamite War in Ireland, Cork was a Jacobite stronghold, and while Elizabeth Fort held out for some time during the siege of Cork, artillery was brought to bear on the eastern walls of the city from a vantage point at Red Abbey. The walls were breached and the city capitulated within four days. In the decades following the siege, the fort ceased to operate as a defensive structure for the city, and in 1719 was put to use as a barracks.

In 1817, it was re-purposed again – this time as a prison, with many prisoners being held at the fort prior to "penal transportation" to New South Wales and other British colonies. It was mostly female prisoners held within the fort from 1822 onwards. The fort remained in use as a convict depot until 1837.

In the late 19th century, the fort reverted to military use and became a station of the Cork City Artillery. During the Irish War of Independence (1919–1921), Elizabeth Fort was used as a base by the "Black and Tans", but was relinquished by the British following the Anglo-Irish Treaty. During the succeeding Irish Civil War the fort was burned by anti-treaty forces in August 1922.

The remaining interior structures of the fort date from a rebuild following this fire. Though briefly housing an air-raid shelter during "The Emergency" (1939–1945), the rebuilt interior buildings from the 1920s continued in use as a Garda (police) station until 2013. Following the closure of the Garda station buildings, the site came under the management of Cork City Council having previously been in the care of the Office of Public Works.

== Tourism ==
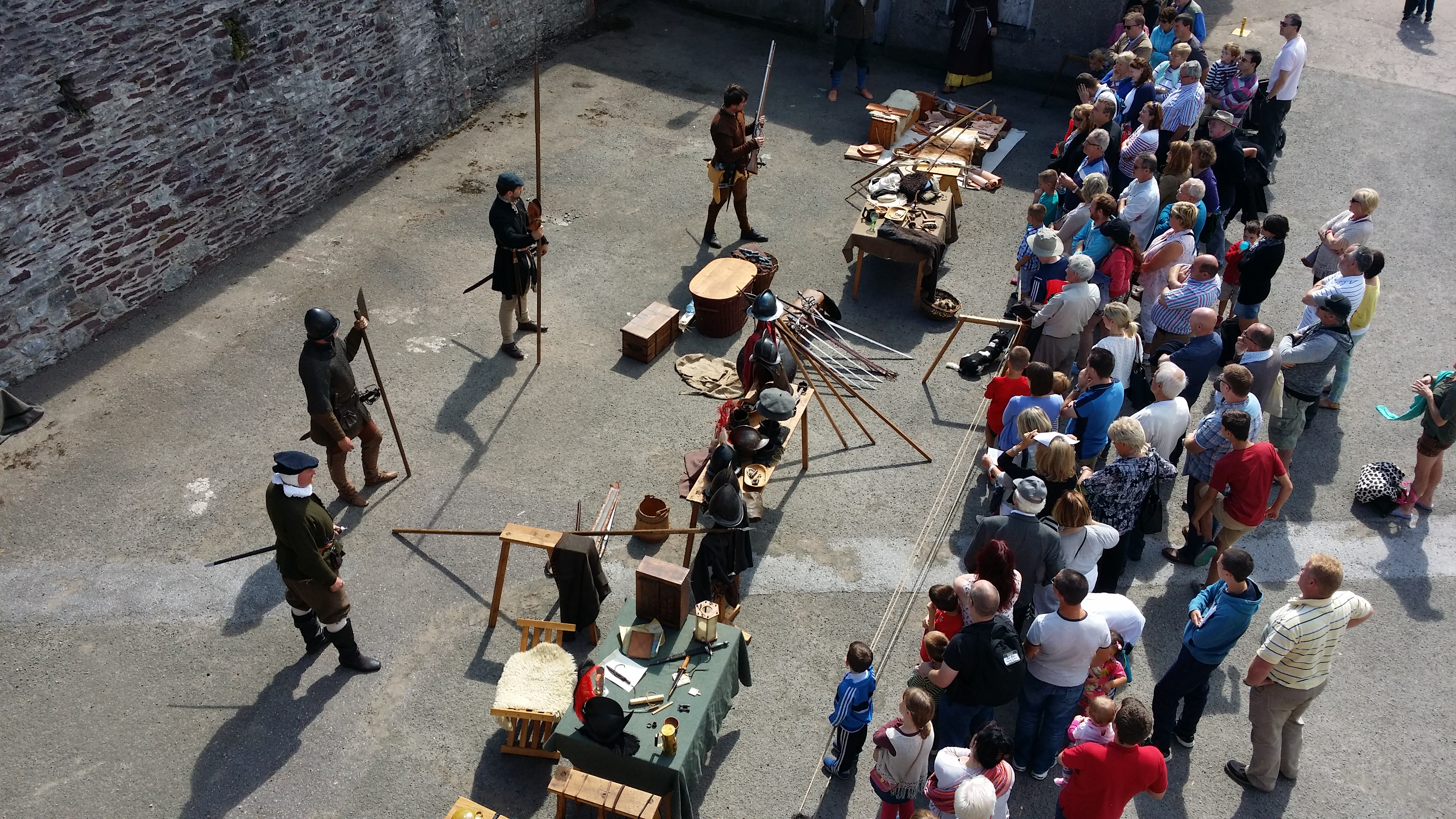
Reenactment display within the fort

As an continually active military and police barracks for more than 400 years, Elizabeth Fort had not been open for tourism or heritage development. However, local interest groups and site stakeholders (namely the Gardaí, Cork City Council and Office of Public Works) had facilitated the development of the ramparts – which were partly opened to access by tourists on a seasonal basis. Markets and festivals were also occasionally held in the fort.

Since the closure of the Garda station and other offices on the site, local historical interest groups and councillors had advocated the further and permanent development of the site for tourism. In January 2014 the site was fully and formally passed to the control of Cork City Council to facilitate this development under a three-year plan.

Since 2014, Elizabeth Fort has been a venue for a number of events and festivals, including the Cork Midsummer Festival, Cork Heritage Open Day, Heritage Week, Culture Night, Cork Photo 2015 and 2016, the Cork Saint Patrick's Festival and the 2015 Fin Barre's Festival.

While plans were prepared for additional development (including an "interpretive centre"), as of late 2016, funding had not been allocated for these works. In 2018 the Irish Landmark Trust re-developed and re-purposed two of the interior buildings for use as short-let tourist accommodation.

The walls and certain interior spaces of the fort are open to the public six days a week; Tuesday to Saturday 10:00 to 17:00 and Sunday 12:00 to 17:00, with free admission.

== See also ==
- History of Cork
- Charles Fort (Ireland)
