= Scarteen =

Townland in Country Limerick, Ireland

Coordinates: 52.4257°N 8.3712°W

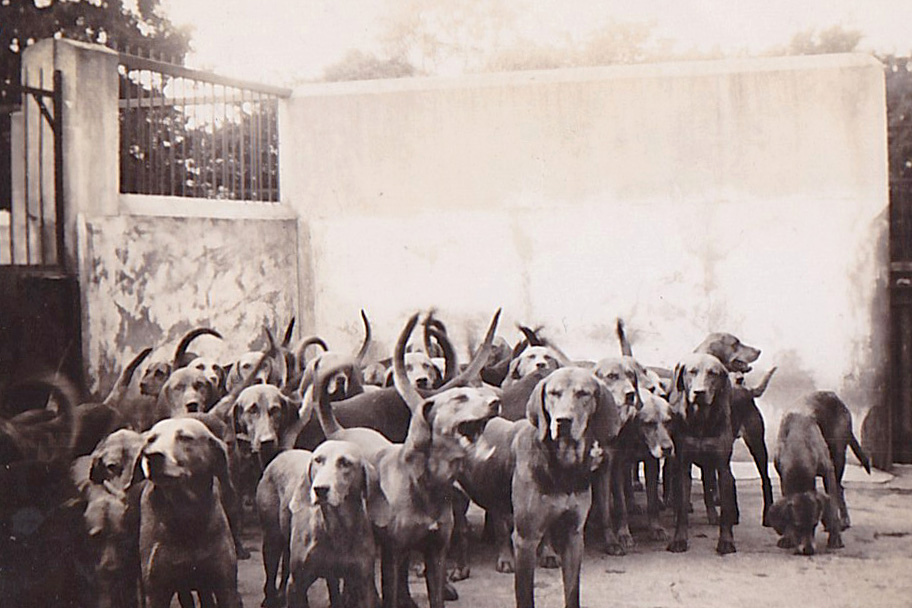
Scarteen Hunt hounds in the 1930s

Scarteen (Irish: An Scairtín, meaning 'small thicket') is a townland in the civil parish of Ballyscaddan, County Limerick, near the village of Knocklong in Ireland.

== Fox hunting ==
Scarteen is best known for the Scarteen Hunt, a fox hunting pack of Kerry Beagles based at Scarteen House, a big house owned since the 1750s by the Ryan family, one of the few Catholic gentry that existed during the period when Ireland had anti-Catholic Penal Laws. The dogs' coat pattern gave the hunt its nickname, the "Black and Tans", later applied derisively to sections of the Royal Irish Constabulary during the Irish War of Independence. Hunt master Thady Ryan (1923–2005) increased the hunt's cachet among visitors from Great Britain and the United States and, later, Continental Europe. Ryan was chef d'equipe of the Irish eventing team at the 1964 and 1968 Summer Olympics. As of 2016 the hunt was mastered by Thady Ryan's son Chris Ryan.
