= Kerry Beagle =

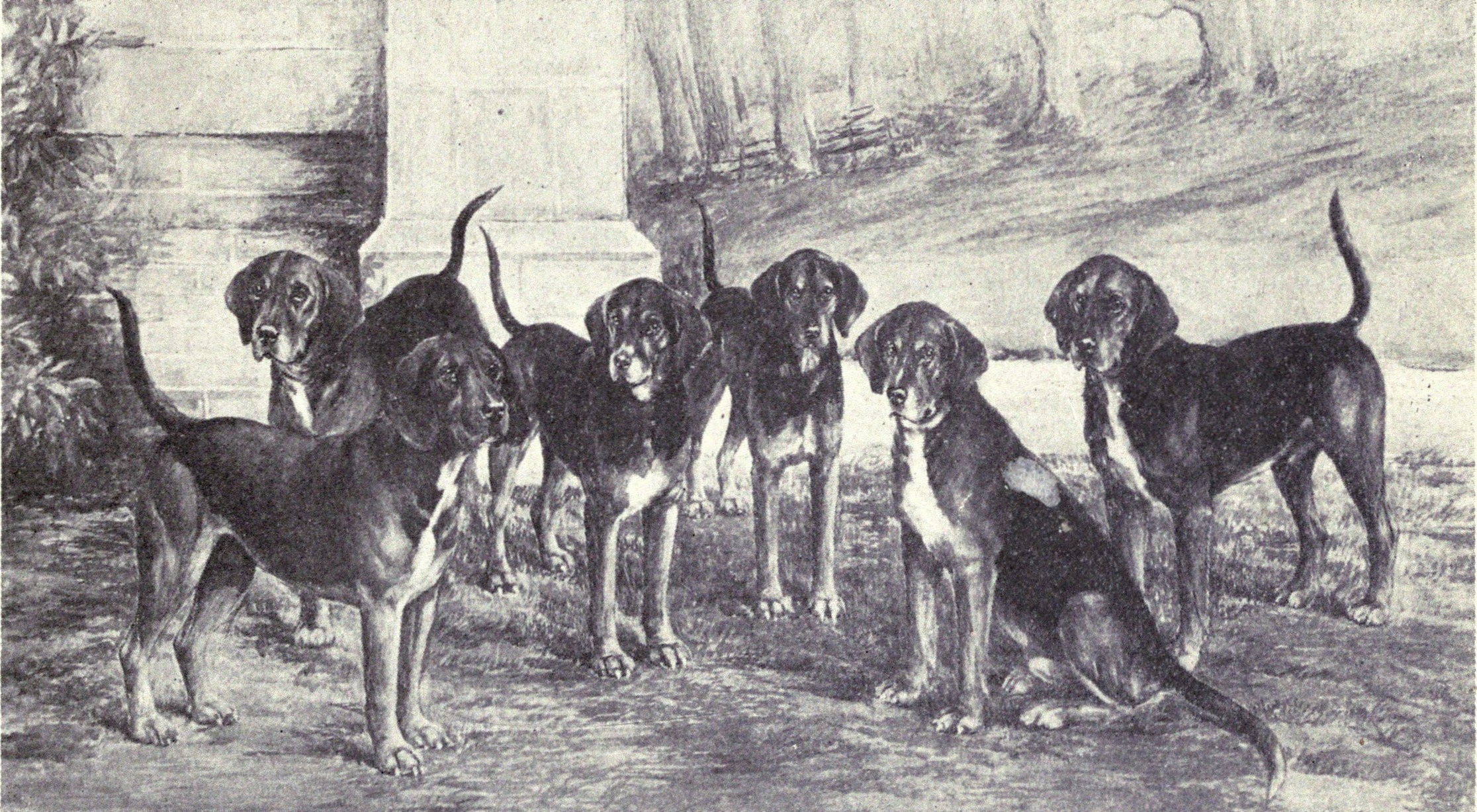
- Kerry Beagles circa 1915
- Origin: Ireland
Kennel club standards
- Irish Kennel Club: standard

The Kerry Beagle (Irish: An Pocadán Ciarraíoch) is the only extant scent hound breed native to Ireland.

== Description ==
=== Appearance ===
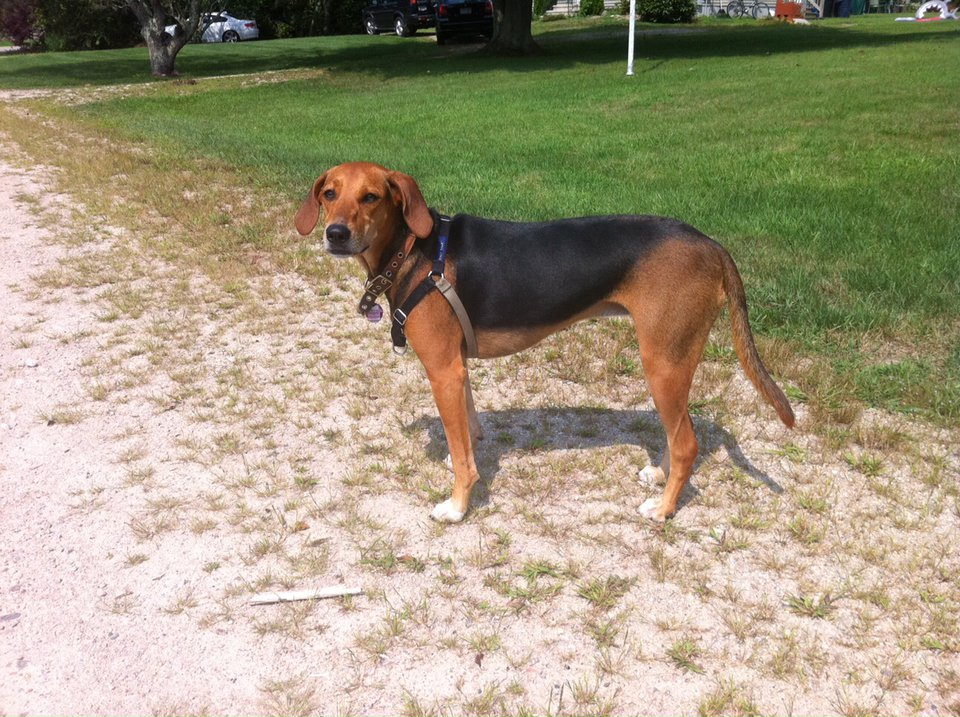
18-month-old 40lb Kerry Beagle mix circa 2012

Despite its name, the Kerry Beagle is not a small hound. Beag is an Irish word for small, given to the dog because it is smaller than other hounds, such as the Irish Wolfhound for whom it flushed deer; with its height being between 56–61 cm (22–24 in), and its weight up to 27 kg (60 lb). The Kerry Beagle has a broad head, a short coat and long ears, black and tan is the more common colour but the coat may be tan and white, blue mottled and tan or black. The breed's looks suggests speed and endurance.

=== Temperament ===
This breed of dog is a pack hound and does hold the hunting instinct strong. They do however make very good pets as they are good with children and other dogs. They require a lot of exercise, regular twice to three times daily walks and free runs.

== History and use ==
The Kerry Beagle believed to date back to the 16th century; detailed pedigrees date back as far as 1794. By the 1800s the Kerry Beagle's numbers had dwindled in Ireland, with only one major pack maintained, the famous Scarteen of County Limerick belonging to the Ryan family, which still exists today.

Originally bred as staghounds, today they are used to hunt fox and hare and take part in drag hunting.

The Kerry Beagle was only recognized by the Irish Kennel Club in 1991.

The Kerry Beagle was taken by many Irish immigrants to the Americas and is considered a foundation breed in the development of the Coonhound and American foxhound.

The breed’s markings were reportedly the origin of the “Black and Tans” nickname applied to recruits to the Royal Irish Constabulary (RIC) during the Irish War of Independence (1919-21). The improvised uniforms initially worn by these men were a mixture of dark RIC or British police tunics and caps, and khaki army trousers, which reminded one observer of the aforementioned foxhunting Kerry Beagles in the Scarteen Hunt. The nickname took hold and persisted even after the men received full RIC uniforms.

== See also ==
- List of dog breeds
