= Thady Ryan =

Irish equestrian

Thady Ryan (23 September 1923, in Dublin – 9 January 2005, in New Zealand) was an Olympic equestrian chef d'équipe for Ireland in 3-day eventing during the Summer Olympics of the 1960s, held in Tokyo, Japan and Mexico City, Mexico. He also was for almost 60 years the master of the Scarteen Hunt, residing at Scarteen House.

== Sources ==
- http://www.friendsandrelations.com/html/detail.php/id/48/relations/thady_ryan.html
- http://www.araltas.com/features/ryan/
- http://www.independent.ie/unsorted/migration/thady-ryan-26204572.html
