= Sack of Balbriggan =

1920 attack in County Dublin, Ireland

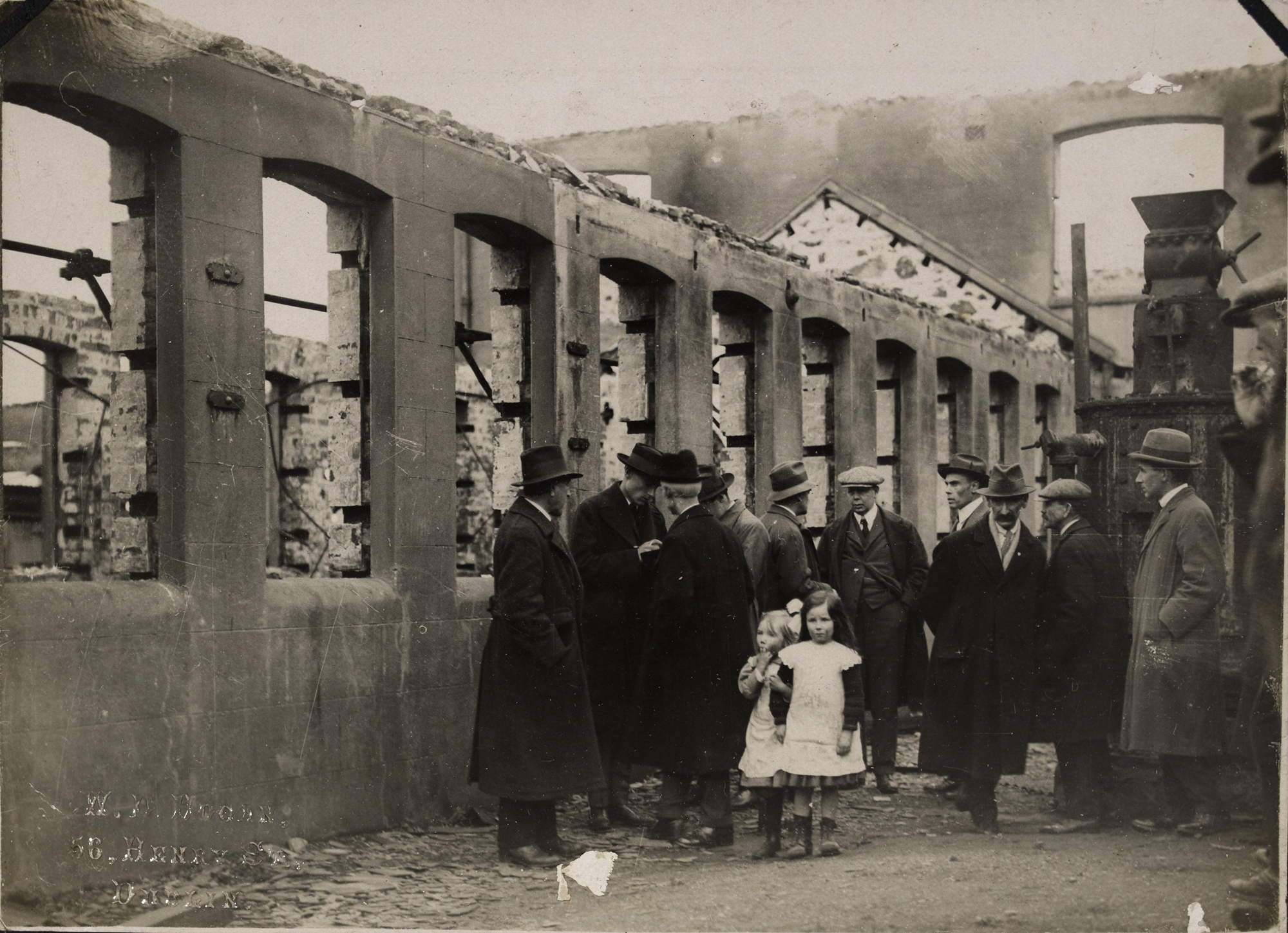
The American Committee for Relief in Ireland inspecting the ruins of Balbriggan – September 1920

The sack of Balbriggan took place on the night of 20 September 1920, during the Irish War of Independence. Auxiliary members of the Royal Irish Constabulary known as "Black and Tans" went on a rampage in the small town of Balbriggan, County Dublin, burning more than fifty homes and businesses, looting, and killing two local men. Many locals were left jobless and homeless.

The attack was claimed to be revenge for the shooting of two police officers in Balbriggan by the Irish Republican Army (IRA). It was the first major 'reprisal' attack against an Irish town during the conflict. The sack of Balbriggan drew international attention, leading to heated debate in the British parliament and criticism of British government policy in Ireland.

== Background ==
In early 1920 the Royal Irish Constabulary (RIC), the British-controlled police force in Ireland, faced increased attacks from the Irish Republican Army (IRA) and boycotts from civilians. The RIC began recruiting reinforcements from Britain, mostly unemployed former soldiers who fought in the First World War. Nicknamed "Black and Tans", they soon gained a reputation for brutality. The Black and Tans were trained at Gormanston military camp near Balbriggan, a small town north of Dublin.

On the evening of 20 September, Head Constable Peter Burke and his brother, Sergeant Michael (or William) Burke, stopped off in Balbriggan on their way to visit Gormanston camp. They drank in a public house with several Black and Tans. There was an altercation in the pub, and local police were called to restore order. After further rowdiness, an IRA unit arrived. Burke was shot dead by the IRA and his brother was badly wounded. The Head Constable had been training British RIC recruits and was reportedly about to be promoted to District Inspector. The shooting does not seem to have been planned.

== Sacking ==
At about 11 pm, trucks carrying 100–150 Black and Tans arrived in Balbriggan from Gormanston. They began burning homes and businesses, smashing windows and firing in the streets. Witnesses said the Black and Tans were cheering and laughing during the attack. In all, 49 homes were destroyed or damaged, twenty of them on Clonard Street. Many townsfolk fled to the fields. The Dublin Evening Mail reported "men, women and children, some of them only scantily attired…fleeing to the country for refuge" and described how "a poor woman experienced great difficulty in getting her baby from its cot before her house was fired".

Four pubs were looted and burnt down. John Derham, a Sinn Féin town commissioner, was arrested and his pub was wrecked and burnt. He was punched in the face and clubbed with a rifle butt. His son Michael was beaten unconscious and left in the burning building. Other businesses were also attacked. A hosiery factory, Deeds & Templar, was destroyed. It had employed 130 workers and a further 180 who did work for it from home.

Two local men, dairyman Seán Gibbons and barber Seamus Lawless, were taken to the town's police barracks for questioning. They were beaten and bayoneted to death and their bodies dumped on Quay Street, near the barracks. According to The Guardian, "one was the chairman and the other was the acting secretary" of the local IRA battalion. A plaque on Quay Street in Balbriggan commemorates the men, and a remembrance ceremony is held there every year.

Historian Tim Pat Coogan writes that the burnings were probably unauthorised.

== Aftermath ==
Partly because of its nearness to Dublin, the attack gained widespread coverage in the Irish, British and international press, becoming known as the 'Sack of Balbriggan' or 'Sacking of Balbriggan'. It was the first major reprisal of its kind, and caused more of British society to question the government's policy in Ireland. Two days after the sacking, British forces carried out another reprisal for the Rineen ambush in County Clare, burning many houses in the surrounding villages and killing five civilians. The press coverage may also have alerted many British ex-servicemen to the prospect of employment in the RIC. In the weeks after the sacking, there was a sudden surge of British recruits into the force.

It led to a heated debate over reprisals in the British parliament. Former Prime Minister and then Liberal Party Leader of the Opposition H. H. Asquith likened Balbriggan to a Belgian town wrecked by the Germans in the First World War. The Labour opposition, through its deputy leader Arthur Henderson, tabled a motion calling for an independent inquiry into the sack of Balbriggan and other towns in Ireland. He said British forces seemed to be undertaking "a policy of military terrorism, which is not only a betrayal of our democratic principles but is totally opposed to the best traditions of the British people". The British government's Chief Secretary for Ireland, Hamar Greenwood, rejected Asquith's comparison and claimed Henderson had been misled by IRA propaganda. He opposed an inquiry, saying the police and military must feel assured that the British government and people were fully behind them. The British parliament voted against holding an inquiry. The Labour Party then decided to establish its own commission, and an American Commission on Conditions in Ireland was also set up.

There were numerous compensation claims for destroyed businesses and homes, including damages totaling over £80,000 for the destruction of the factory, which an inquiry heard had left over 200 jobless and would take two-and-a-half years to rebuild. The families of Gibbons and Lawless were also awarded compensation.

According to local IRA commander Michael Rock, a former British serviceman called William 'Jack' Straw had guided the Black and Tans around Balbriggan, pointing out homes to burn. Thomas Peppard, intelligence officer of the IRA Fingal Brigade, said Straw was "court-martialled and shot" by the IRA for his role in the sacking. His body was found at Bettyville Wood a month later.

IRA volunteer Joseph Lawless said the IRA planned a major attack on the Black and Tans based at Gormanston after the sacking. It involved drawing many of them into an ambush in Balbriggan, while another IRA group attacked and burned the lightly-defended Gormanston camp. This plan was abandoned after the events of Bloody Sunday.

== See also ==
- Burning of Cork
