= Burning of Cork =

1920 British act in the Irish War of Independence

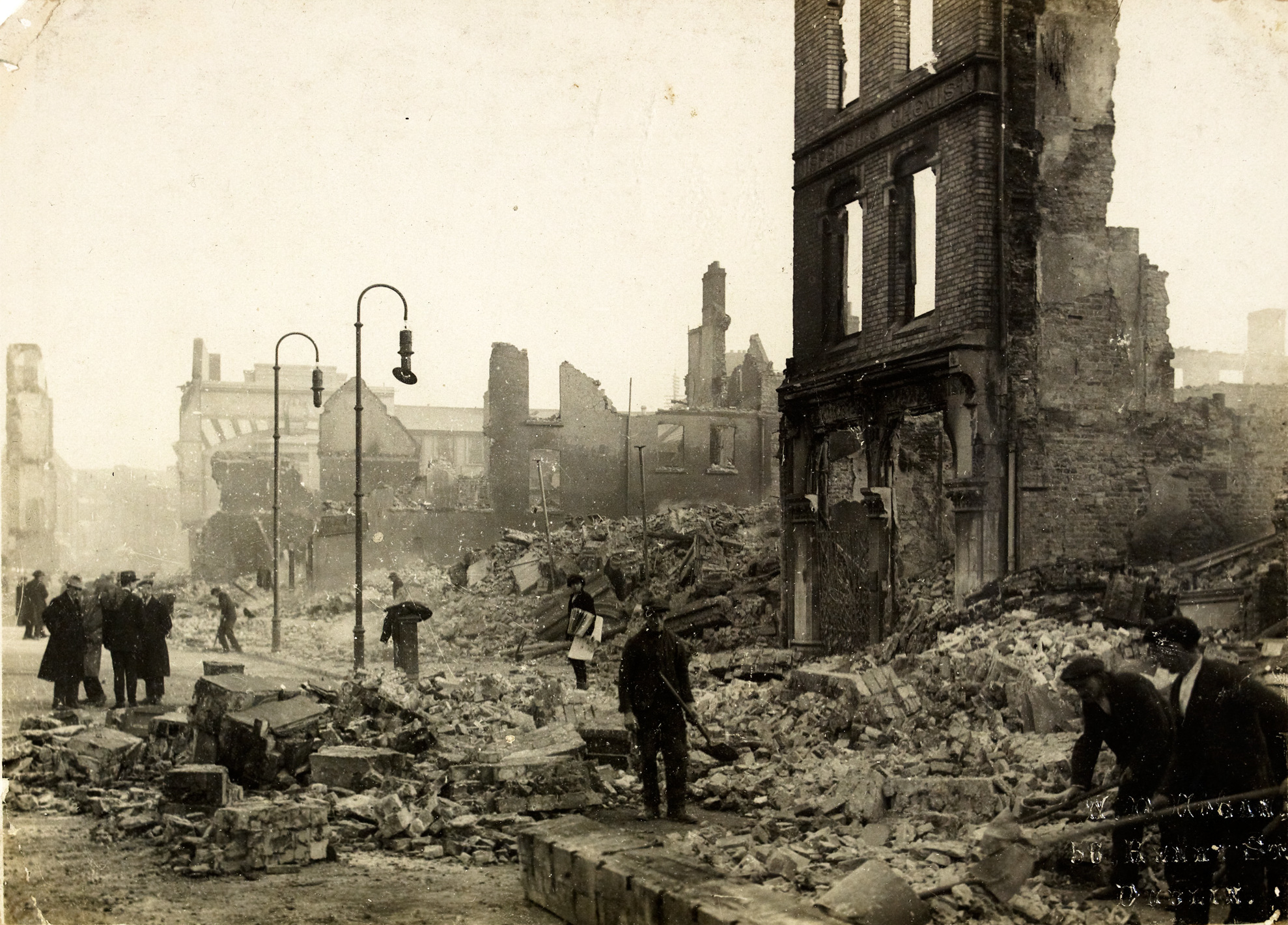
Workers clearing rubble on St Patrick's Street in Cork after the fires

The burning of Cork (Irish: Dó Chorcaí) by British forces took place during the Irish War of Independence on the night of 11–12 December 1920. It followed an Irish Republican Army (IRA) ambush of a British Auxiliary patrol in the city, which wounded twelve Auxiliaries, one fatally. In retaliation, the Auxiliaries, Black and Tans and British soldiers burned homes near the ambush site, before looting and burning numerous buildings in the centre of Cork, Ireland's third-biggest city. Many Irish civilians reported being beaten, shot at, and robbed by British forces. Firefighters testified that British forces hindered their attempts to tackle the blazes by intimidation, cutting their hoses and shooting at them. Two unarmed IRA volunteers were also shot dead at their home in the north of the city.

More than 40 business premises, 300 residential properties, the City Hall and Carnegie Library were destroyed by fires, many of which were started by incendiary bombs. The economic damage was estimated at over £3 million (equivalent to approximately €150 million in 2021), while 2,000 were left jobless and many more became homeless.

British forces carried out many similar reprisals on Irish civilians during the war, notably the Sack of Balbriggan three months before and the burning of Knockcroghery six months later, but the burning of Cork was one of the most substantial. The British government at first denied that its forces had started the fires, and only agreed to hold a military inquiry. This concluded that a company of Auxiliaries were responsible, but the government refused to publish the report at the time. No one was held accountable for the burning.

== Background ==
The Irish War of Independence began in 1919, following the declaration of an Irish Republic and founding of its parliament, Dáil Éireann. The Irish Republican Army (IRA) waged guerrilla warfare against British forces: the British Army and the Royal Irish Constabulary (RIC). In response, the RIC began recruiting reinforcements from Britain, mostly unemployed former soldiers who fought in the First World War. Some were recruited into the RIC as regular police constables who became known as "Black and Tans". Other former army officers were recruited into the new Auxiliary Division, a counter-insurgency unit of the RIC.

The Auxiliaries and the "Black and Tans" became infamous for carrying out numerous reprisals for IRA attacks, which included extrajudicial killings and burning property. In March 1920, the republican Lord Mayor of Cork, Tomás Mac Curtain, was shot dead at his home by police with blackened faces. In reprisal for an IRA attack in Balbriggan on 20 September 1920, "Black and Tans" burnt more than fifty homes and businesses in the village and killed two local republicans in their custody. This drew international attention and became known as the Sack of Balbriggan. Two days later, following the Rineen ambush in which six RIC officers were killed, police burnt many homes in the surrounding villages and killed five civilians. Several other villages suffered similar reprisals over the following months. IRA intelligence officer Florence O'Donoghue said the subsequent burning and looting of Cork was "not an isolated incident, but rather the large-scale application of a policy initiated and approved, implicitly or explicitly, by the British government".

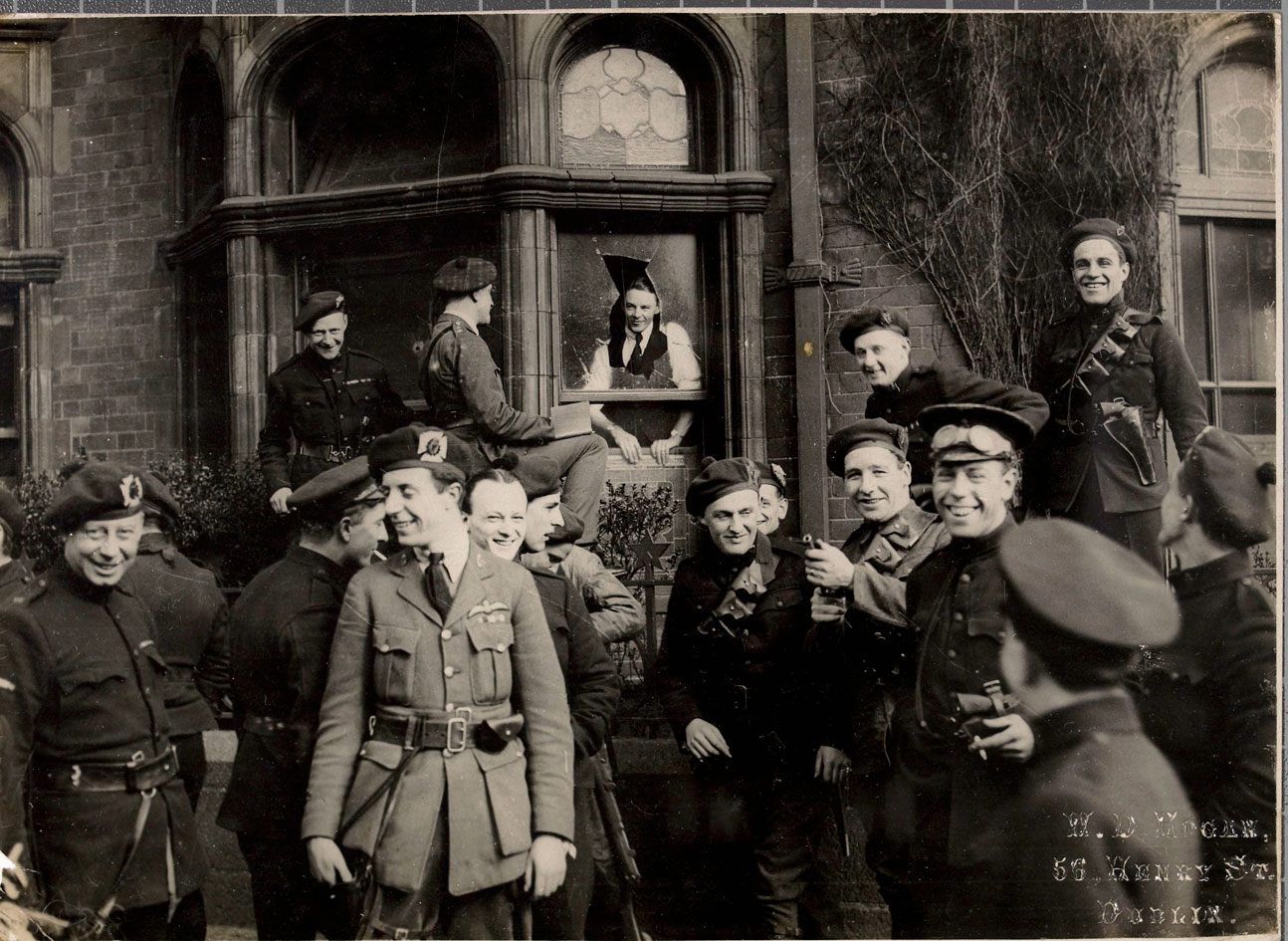
A group of "Black and Tans" and Auxiliaries in Dublin, April 1921

County Cork was a centre of the war. On 23 November 1920, a non-uniformed "Black and Tan" threw a grenade into a group of IRA volunteers who had just left a brigade meeting on St Patrick's Street, Cork's main street. Three IRA volunteers of the 1st Cork Brigade were killed: Paddy Trahey, Patrick Donohue and Seamus Mehigan. The New York Times reported that sixteen people were injured.

On 28 November 1920, the IRA's 3rd Cork Brigade ambushed an Auxiliary patrol at Kilmichael, killing 17 Auxiliaries; the biggest loss of life for the British in the war. On 10 December, the British authorities declared martial law in counties Cork (including the city), Kerry, Limerick, and Tipperary. It imposed a military curfew on Cork city, which began at 10 pm each night. IRA volunteer Seán Healy recalled that "at least 1,000 troops would pour out of Victoria Barracks at this hour and take over complete control of the city".

== Ambush at Dillon's Cross ==
IRA intelligence established that an Auxiliary patrol usually left Victoria Barracks (in the north of the city) each night at 8 pm and made its way to the city centre via Dillon's Cross. On 11 December, IRA commander Seán O'Donoghue received intelligence that two lorries of Auxiliaries would be leaving the barracks that night and travelling with them would be British Army Intelligence Corps Captain James Kelly.

That evening, a unit of six IRA volunteers commanded by O'Donoghue took up position between the barracks and Dillon's Cross. Their goal was to destroy the patrol and capture or kill Captain Kelly. Five of the volunteers hid behind a stone wall while one, Michael Kenny, stood across the road dressed as an off-duty British officer. When the lorries neared he was to beckon the driver of the first lorry to slow down or stop. The ambush position was a "couple of hundred yards" from the barracks.

At 8 pm, two lorries each carrying 13 Auxiliaries emerged from the barracks. The first lorry slowed when the driver spotted Kenny and, as it did so, the IRA unit attacked with grenades and revolvers. The official British report said that 12 Auxiliaries were wounded and that one, Spencer Chapman—a former officer in the 4th Battalion London Regiment (Royal Fusiliers)—died from his wounds shortly after. As the IRA unit made its escape, some of the Auxiliaries fired on them while others dragged the wounded to the nearest cover: O'Sullivan's pub.

The Auxiliaries broke into the pub with weapons drawn. They ordered everyone to put their hands over their heads to be searched. Backup and an ambulance were sent from the nearby barracks. One witness described young men being rounded up and forced to lie on the ground. The Auxiliaries dragged one of them to the middle of the crossroads, stripped him naked and forced him to sing "God Save the King" until he collapsed on the road.

== Burning and looting ==
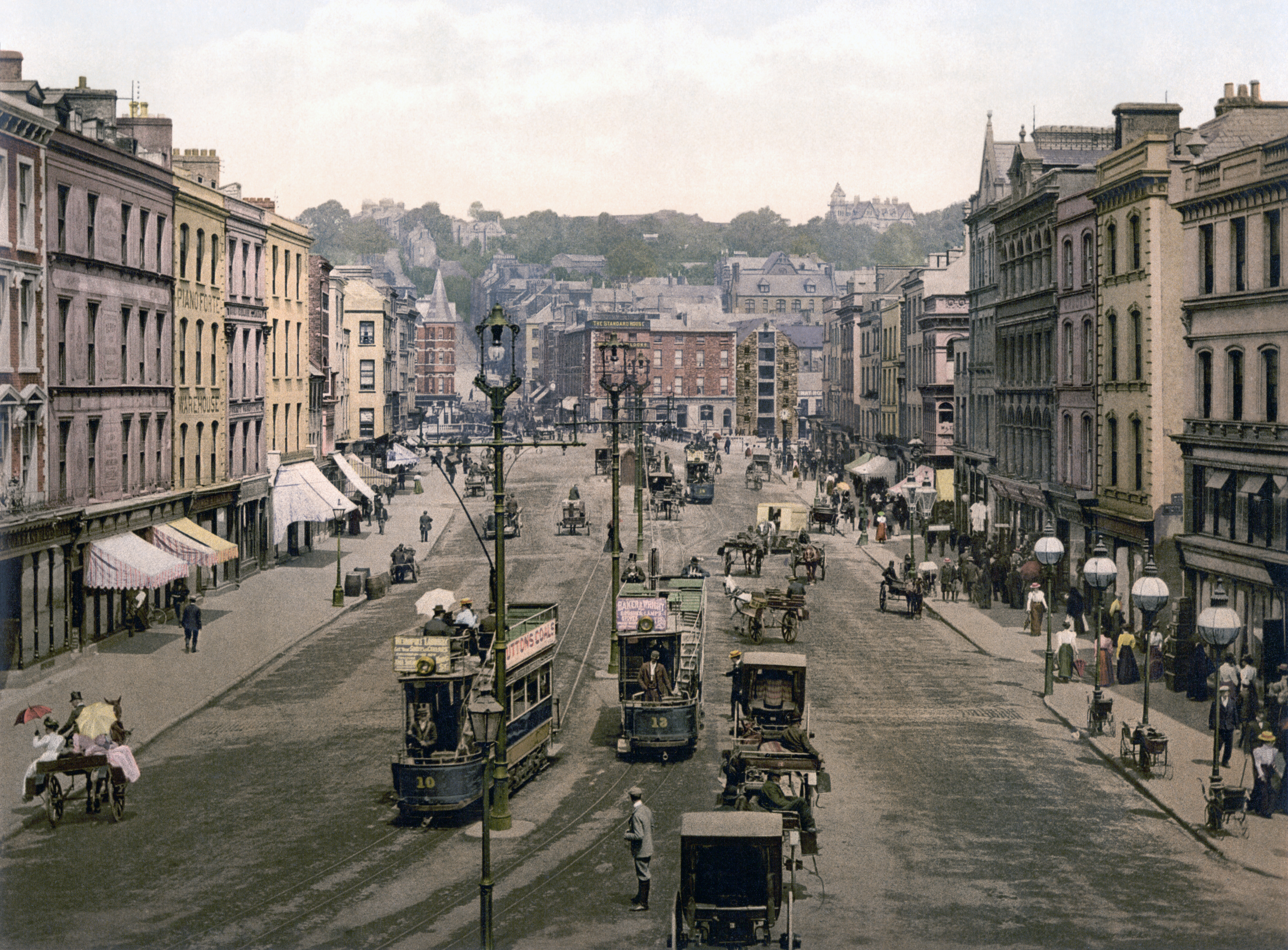
St Patrick's Street, Cork, c. 1900

Angered by an attack so near their headquarters and seeking retribution for the deaths of their colleagues at Kilmichael, the Auxiliaries gathered to wreak their revenge. Charles Schulze, an Auxiliary and a former British Army Captain in the Dorsetshire Regiment during the First World War, organized a group of Auxiliaries to burn the centre of Cork.

At 9:30 pm, lorries of Auxiliaries and British soldiers left the barracks and alighted at Dillon's Cross, where they broke into houses and herded the occupants on to the street. They then set the houses on fire and stood guard as they were razed to the ground. Those who tried to intervene were fired upon and some were badly beaten. Seven buildings were set alight at the crossroads. When one was found to be owned by Protestants, the Auxiliaries quickly doused the fire.

British forces began driving around the city firing at random, as people rushed to get home before the 10 pm curfew. A group of armed and uniformed Auxiliaries surrounded a tram at Summerhill, smashed its windows, and forced all the passengers out. Some of the passengers (including at least three women) were repeatedly kicked, hit with rifle butts, threatened, and verbally abused. The Auxiliaries then forced the passengers to line up against a wall and searched them, while continuing the physical and verbal abuse. Some had their money and belongings stolen. One of those attacked was a Catholic priest, who was singled out for sectarian abuse. Another tram was set on fire near Father Mathew's statue. Meanwhile, witnesses reported seeing a group of 14–18 Black and Tans firing wildly for upwards of 20 minutes on nearby MacCurtain Street.

Soon after, witnesses reported groups of armed men on and around St Patrick's Street, the city's main shopping area. Most were uniformed or partially-uniformed Auxiliaries and some were British soldiers, while others wore no uniforms. They were seen firing into the air, smashing shop windows and setting buildings alight. Many reported hearing bombs exploding. A group of Auxiliaries were seen throwing a bomb into the ground floor of the Munster Arcade, which housed both shops and flats. It exploded under the residential quarters while people were inside the building. They managed to escape unharmed but were detained by the Auxiliaries.

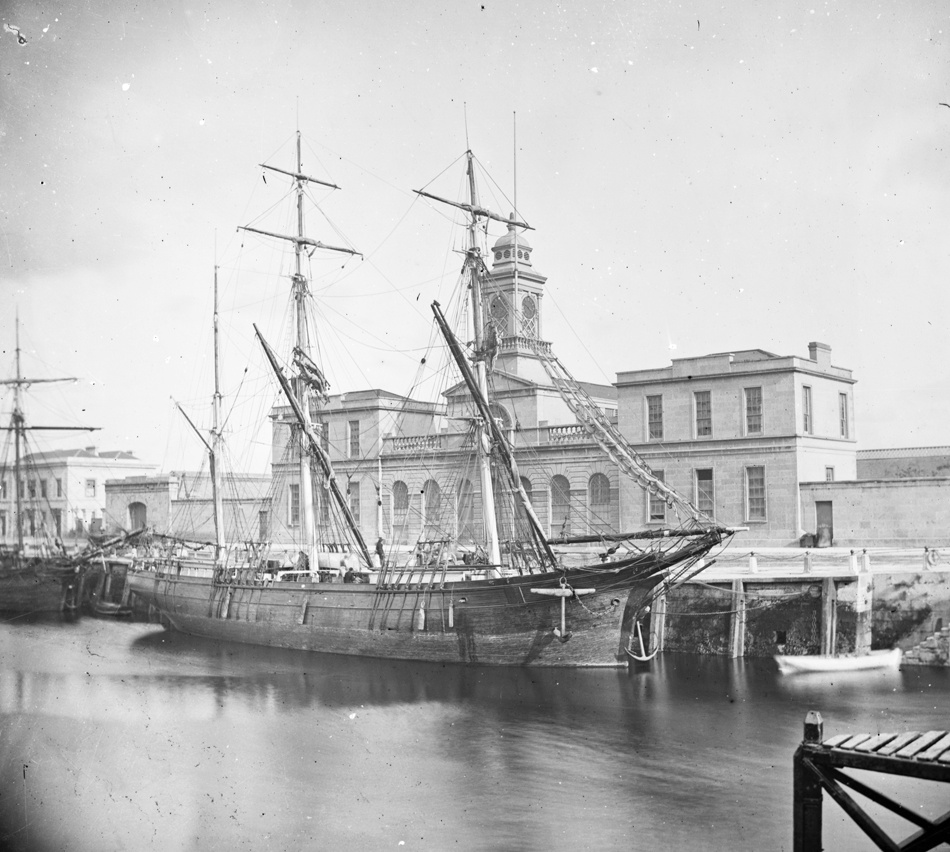
Cork City Hall in the 1870s. The building was destroyed during the burning of Cork.

The city's fire brigade was informed of the fire at Dillon's Cross shortly before 10 pm and were sent to deal with it at once. On finding that Grant's department store on St Patrick's Street was ablaze, they decided to tackle it first. The fire brigade's Superintendent, Alfred Hutson, called Victoria Barracks and asked them to tackle the fire at Dillon's Cross so that he could focus on the city centre; the barracks took no heed of his request. As he did not have enough resources to deal with all the fires at once, "he would have to make choices – some fires he would fight, others he could not". Hutson oversaw the operation on St Patrick's Street, and met Cork Examiner reporter Alan Ellis. He told Ellis "that all the fires were being deliberately started by incendiary bombs, and in several cases he had seen soldiers pouring cans of petrol into buildings and setting them alight".

Firemen later testified that British forces hindered their attempts to tackle the blazes by intimidating them and cutting or driving over their hoses. Firemen were also shot at, and at least two were wounded by gunfire. Shortly after 3 am, reporter Alan Ellis came upon a unit of the fire brigade pinned down by gunfire near City Hall. The firemen said that they were being shot at by Black and Tans who had broken into the building. They also claimed to have seen uniformed men carrying cans of petrol into the building from nearby Union Quay barracks.

At about 4 am there was a large explosion and City Hall and the neighbouring Carnegie Library went up in flames, resulting in the loss of many of the city's public records. According to Ellis, the Black and Tans had detonated high explosives inside City Hall. When more firefighters arrived, British forces shot at them and refused them access to water. The last act of arson took place at about 6 am when a group of policemen looted and burnt the Murphy Brothers' clothes shop on Washington Street.

== Dublin Hill shooting ==
After the ambush at Dillon's Cross, IRA commander Seán O'Donoghue and volunteer James O'Mahony made their way to the farmhouse of the Delany (often spelled Delaney) family at Dublin Hill on the northern outskirts of the city, not far from the ambush site. Brothers Cornelius and Jeremiah Delany were members of F Company, 1st Battalion, 1st Cork Brigade IRA. O'Donoghue hid some grenades on the farm and the two men went their separate ways.

At about 2 am, at least eight armed men entered the house and went upstairs into the brothers' bedroom. The brothers got up and stood at the bedside and were asked their names. When they answered, the gunmen opened fire. Jeremiah was killed outright and Cornelius died of his wounds on 18 December. Their elderly relative, William Dunlea, was wounded by gunfire. The brothers' father said the gunmen wore long overcoats and spoke with English accents. It is thought that, while searching the ambush site, Auxiliaries had found a cap belonging to one of the volunteers and had used bloodhounds to follow the scent to the family's home.

== Aftermath ==
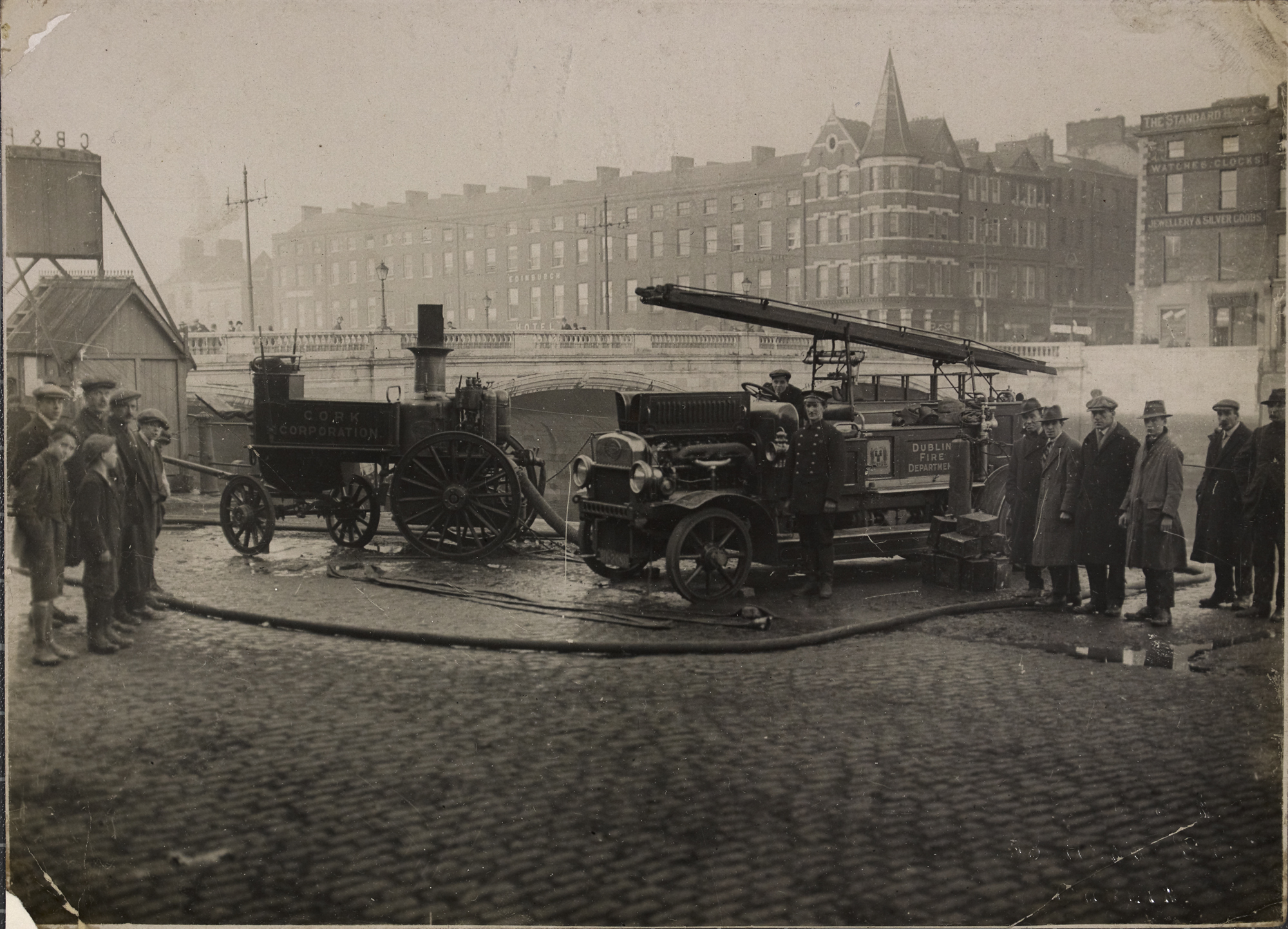
Fire engines sent from Dublin to help deal with the aftermath of the fires

Over 40 business premises and 300 residential properties were destroyed, amounting to over five acres of the city. Over £3 million worth of damage (1920 value) was caused, although the value of property looted by British forces is not clear. Many people became homeless and 2,000 were left jobless. Fatalities included an Auxiliary killed by the IRA, two IRA volunteers killed by Auxiliaries, and a woman who died from a heart attack when Auxiliaries burst into her house. Several people, including firefighters, had reportedly been assaulted or otherwise wounded.

Florence O'Donoghue, intelligence officer of the 1st Cork Brigade IRA at the time, described the scene in Cork on the morning of the 12th:

Many familiar landmarks were gone forever – where whole buildings had collapsed here and there a solitary wall leaned at some crazy angle from its foundation. The streets ran with sooty water, the footpaths were strewn with broken glass and debris, ruins smoked and smouldered and over everything was the all-pervasive smell of burning.

The fire brigade, over-worked and over-stretched, had to continue pouring water on the smoldering buildings to prevent fires re-igniting. Early in the morning, Lord Mayor Donal O'Callaghan requested help from other fire brigades. A motor fire-engine and crew were immediately sent by train from Dublin, and a horse-drawn engine was sent from Limerick.

At midday mass in the North Cathedral the Bishop of Cork, Daniel Cohalan, condemned the arson but said the burning of the city was a result of the "murderous ambush at Dillon's Cross" and vowed, "I will certainly issue a decree of excommunication against anyone who, after this notice, shall take part in an ambush or a kidnapping or attempted murder or arson". No excommunications were issued, and the bishop's edict was largely ignored by pro-republican priests and chaplains.

A meeting of Cork Corporation was held that afternoon at the Corn Exchange. Councillor J. J. Walsh condemned the bishop for his comments, which he claimed held the Irish people up as the "evil-doers". Walsh said that while the people of Cork had been suffering, "not a single word of protest was uttered [by the bishop], and today, after the city has been decimated, he saw no better course than to add insult to injury". Councillor Michael Ó Cuill, alderman Tadhg Barry and the Lord Mayor, Donal O'Callaghan, agreed with Walsh's sentiments. The members resolved that the Lord Mayor should send a telegram asking for the intervention of the European governments and the United States.

Three days after the burning, on 15 December, two lorry-loads of Auxiliaries were travelling from Dunmanway to Cork for the funeral of Spencer Chapman, their comrade killed at Dillon's Cross. They met an elderly priest (Fr Thomas Magner) and a young man (Tadhg O'Crowley) helping another man fix his car. The Auxiliary commander, Vernon Anwyl Hart, got out and began questioning them. He beat and shot Crowley, then forced the priest to his knees and shot him also. Both were killed. A military court of inquiry heard that Hart had been a friend of Chapman and had been "drinking steadily" since his death. Hart was found guilty of murder, but insane. At a subsequent investigation, one of the reasons given for killing the priest was that he refused to have the parish church bells tolled after the Kilmichael ambush, in which 17 Auxiliaries were killed.

=== Investigation ===
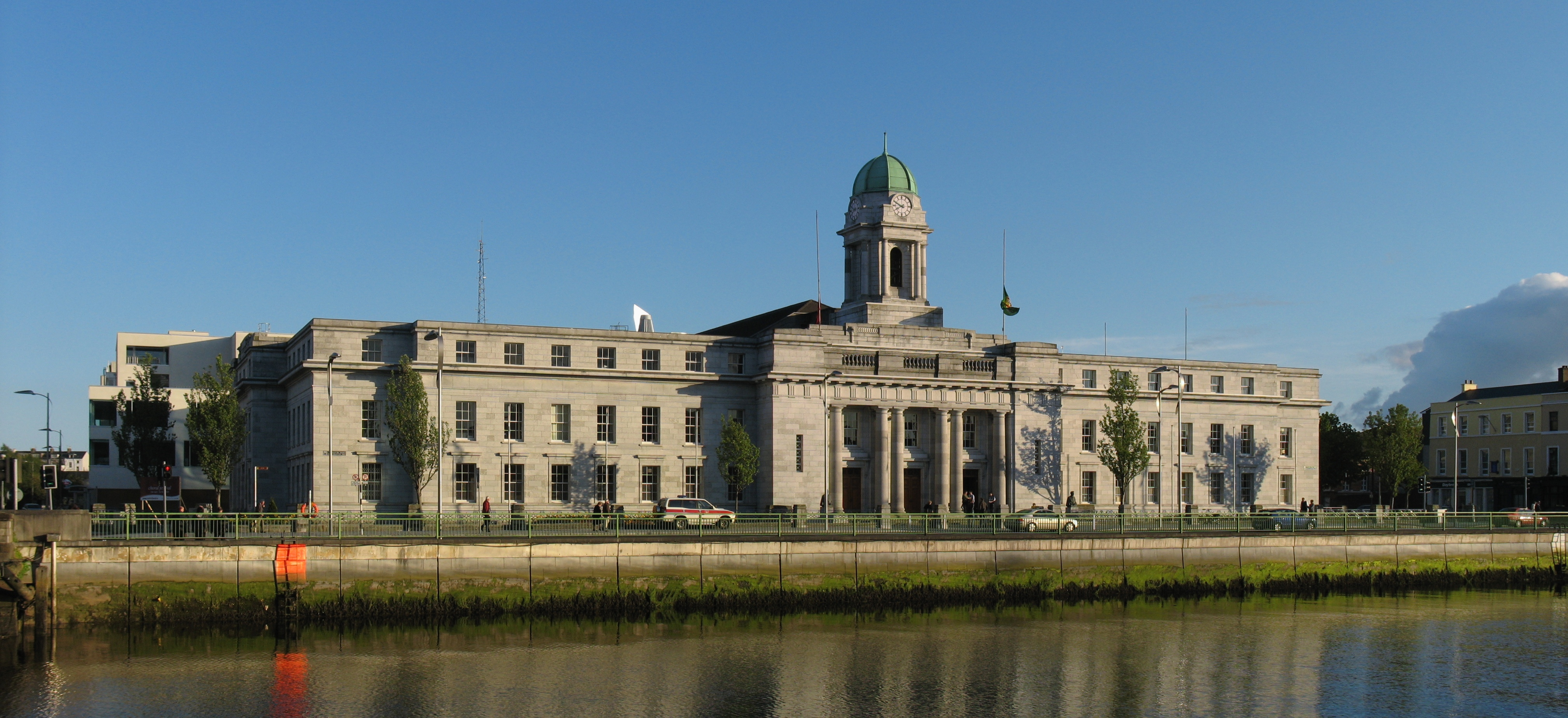
The re-built Cork City Hall, completed in the 1930s

Irish nationalists called for an open and impartial inquiry. In the British House of Commons, Sir Hamar Greenwood, the Chief Secretary for Ireland, refused demands for such an inquiry. He denied that British forces had any involvement and suggested the IRA started the fires in the city centre, although he said that several houses at Dillon's Cross "were destroyed because from these houses bombs were thrown at the police". When asked about reports of firefighters being attacked by British forces he said "Every available policeman and soldier in Cork was turned out at once and without their assistance the fire brigade could not have gone through the crowds and did the work that they tried to do".

Conservative Party leader Bonar Law said "in the present condition of Ireland, we are much more likely to get an impartial inquiry in a military court than in any other". Greenwood announced that a military inquiry would be carried out by General Peter Strickland. This resulted in the "Strickland Report", but Cork Corporation instructed its employees and other corporate officials to take no part. The report blamed members of the Auxiliaries' K Company, based at Victoria Barracks. The Auxiliaries, it was claimed, burnt the city centre in reprisal for the IRA attack at Dillon's Cross. The British Government refused to publish the report.

The Irish Labour Party and Trades Union Congress published a pamphlet in January 1921 entitled Who burned Cork City? The work drew on evidence from hundreds of eyewitness which suggested that the fires had been set by British forces and that British forces had prevented firefighters from tackling the blazes. The material was compiled by the president of University College Cork, Alfred O'Rahilly.

K Company Auxiliary Charles Schulze, a former British Army captain, wrote in a letter to his girlfriend in England calling the burning of Cork "sweet revenge", while in a letter to his mother he wrote: "Many who had witnessed scenes in France and Flanders say that nothing they had experienced was comparable with the punishment meted out in Cork". After the burning, K Company was moved to Dunmanway and began wearing burnt corks in their caps in reference to the burning of the city. For their part in the arson and looting, K Company was disbanded on 31 March 1921.

There has been debate over whether British forces at Victoria Barracks had planned to burn the city before the ambush at Dillon's Cross, whether the British Army itself was involved, and whether those who set the fires were being commanded by superior officers. Florence O'Donoghue, who was intelligence officer of the 1st Cork Brigade IRA at the time, wrote:

What appears more probable is that the ambush provided the excuse for an act which was long premeditated and for which all arrangements had been made. The rapidity with which supplies of petrol and Verey lights were brought from Cork barracks to the centre of the city, and the deliberate manner in which the work of firing the various premises was divided amongst groups under the control of officers, gives evidence of organisation and pre-arrangement. Moreover, the selection of certain premises for destruction and the attempt made by an Auxiliary officer to prevent the looting of one shop by Black and Tans: "You are in the wrong shop; that man is a Loyalist" and the reply, "We don't give a damn; this is the shop that was pointed out to us", is additional proof that the matter had been carefully planned beforehand.
