= Black and Tans =

Nickname for certain constables of the Royal Irish Constabulary

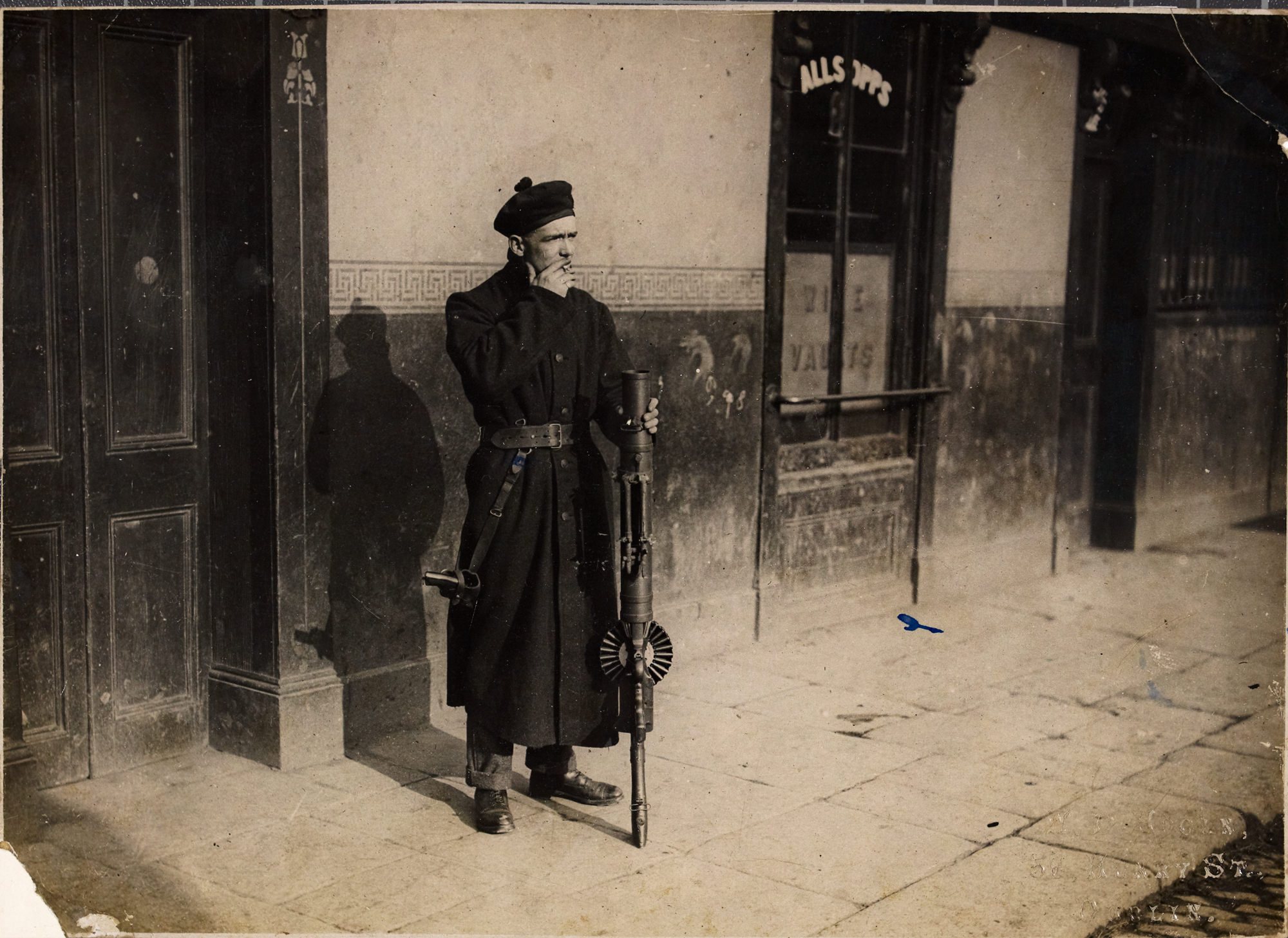
A member of the Auxiliary Division of the RIC in Dublin, smoking and carrying a Lewis gun, February 1921

The Black and Tans (Irish: Dúchrónaigh) were constables recruited into the Royal Irish Constabulary (RIC) as reinforcements during the Irish War of Independence. Recruitment began in Great Britain in January 1920, and about 10,000 men enlisted during the conflict. The majority were unemployed former British soldiers from England, Scotland, and Wales who had fought in the First World War. Some sources count Irish recruits to the RIC from 1920 as "Black and Tans".

The Black and Tans had a reputation for brutality; they committed murder, arson, and looting and became notorious for reprisal attacks on civilians and civilian property. Their actions further swayed Irish public opinion against British rule and drew condemnation in Britain. The Black and Tans were sometimes confused with the Auxiliary Division, a counterinsurgency unit of the RIC, also recruited during the conflict and made up of former British officers. At the time, "Black and Tans" was sometimes used for both groups. Another force, the Ulster Special Constabulary (commonly called the "B-Specials"), was founded in 1920 to reinforce the RIC in Northern Ireland.

The British administration in Ireland promoted the idea of bolstering the RIC with British recruits. They were to help the overstretched RIC maintain control and suppress the Irish Republican Army (IRA), although they were less well trained in ordinary police methods. The nickname "Black and Tans" arose from the colours of the improvised uniforms they initially wore, a mixture of dark green RIC (which appeared black) and khaki British Army. They served in all parts of Ireland, but most were sent to southern and western regions where fighting was heaviest. By 1921, for example, the Black and Tans made up almost half of the RIC in County Tipperary.

== Name ==
The nickname "Black and Tans" arose from the improvised uniforms they initially wore. Due to a shortage of RIC uniforms, the new recruits were issued with a mixture of dark RIC tunics and caps and khaki army trousers. Local Irish republican Dan Breen said that the nickname was born in the Knocklong area of south Tipperary and east Limerick, where a famous hound pack called the "Black and Tans" had existed for many years. A contributor to the Limerick Echo of 25 March 1920 wrote that meeting a group of recruits on a train at Limerick Junction, the attire of one reminded him of the Scarteen Hunt, whose "Black and Tans" nickname derived from the colours of its Kerry Beagles. A Clare comedian elaborated the joke in Limerick's Theatre Royal and the nickname soon took hold, persisting even after the men received full RIC uniforms.

Some modern sources refer to the Black and Tans as the "RIC Special Reserve". However, historians agree that they were not a separate reserve force but "recruits to the regular RIC" and "enlisted as regular constabulary". The name "special reserve" has not been found in any historical documents. Canadian historian D. M. Leeson partially blames Wikipedia for promoting this misnomer.

The Irish name for the Black and Tans is na Dúchrónaigh, deriving from dubhchrónach, the Irish word for twilight, which itself derives ultimately from dubh ("black") and crón ("dark yellow/tan"). It is a neologism and was not used in traditional spoken Irish.

=== Definition ===
As "Black and Tans" was not the official name of any RIC formation, there is some disagreement over which RIC men it should apply to. Some historians, such as David Leeson, Tom Toomey and Jim Herlihy, define "Black and Tans" as only those RIC recruits from Britain during the War of Independence. Leeson argues that British-recruited police received less training, which took place at Gormanston Camp rather than the RIC depot in Phoenix Park. Herlihy says the British-recruited personnel were recruited differently and trained for a shorter time and considers them to have formed a "Special Reserve". Others, such as William Lowe and Seán William Gannon, also count those recruited in Ireland during the conflict as Black and Tans. Gannon argues that records do not show a large difference in training time between British and Irish-recruited personnel, that both wore the black-and-tan uniform, and that they performed identical duties.

=== Auxiliary Division ===
During the Irish War of Independence (on 27 July 1921), the British government founded the Auxiliary Division of the RIC (ADRIC), which was set up as a mobile strike force to support the RIC. The ADRIC or “Auxies” are sometimes conflated with the "Black and Tans". British politicians also occasionally conflated them at the time. However, while the "Black and Tans" were regular constables, the Auxiliary Division was a paramilitary counterinsurgency force which was operationally independent and composed of former British military officers. Thus, academic sources generally distinguish the Auxiliaries from the "Black and Tans". At least some of the crimes attributed to the Black and Tans were actually the work of the Auxiliaries.

== Foundation ==
The early 20th century in Ireland was dominated by Irish nationalists' pursuit of Home Rule from the United Kingdom. The issue of Home Rule was shelved with the outbreak of World War I, and in 1916 Irish republicans staged the Easter Rising against British rule in an attempt to establish an independent republic. Growing support amongst the Irish populace for the republican Sinn Féin party saw it win a majority of Irish seats in the 1918 general election. On 21 January 1919, Sinn Féin followed through on its manifesto and founded an independent Irish parliament (Dáil Éireann), which then declared an independent Irish Republic. The Dáil called on the public to boycott the RIC, while the Irish Republican Army (IRA) began attacking police barracks and ambushing police patrols. In September 1919 David Lloyd George, the British Prime Minister, outlawed the Dáil and augmented the British Army presence in Ireland.

After the First World War, there were many unemployed ex-servicemen in Britain. British Unionist leader Walter Long had suggested recruiting these men into the RIC in a May 1919 letter to John French, the Lord Lieutenant of Ireland. The idea was promoted by French as well as by Frederick Shaw, Commander of the British Army in Ireland. The RIC's Inspector General, Joseph Byrne, was against it. He resisted the militarisation of the police and believed ex-soldiers could not be controlled by police discipline. In December 1919, Byrne was replaced by his deputy T. J. Smith, an Orangeman. On 27 December, Smith issued an order authorising recruitment in Britain. The advertisements appeared in major cities calling for men willing to "face a rough and dangerous task". The first British recruits joined the RIC six days later, on 2 January 1920. By June 1920 the RIC was considered to be under strength while being increasingly threatened. Many RIC members were older men who were forced into living in a state of constant vigilance. The newly appointed 'Police Adviser' to the Dublin Castle administration in Ireland Lieutenant-General Hugh Tudor called for the adding of 4,000 men to the RIC.

=== Recruits ===
About 10,000 were recruited between January 1920 and the end of the conflict. About 100 were recruited each month from January to June 1920. The recruitment rate rose from July, when the RIC was given a large pay raise. The RIC began losing men at a high rate in the summer of 1920, due to the IRA campaign. On an average week, about 100 men resigned or retired while only 76 recruits enlisted to replace them. More police were needed, but enough replacements could not be found in Ireland; on average, the RIC recruited only seven Irishmen per week. The intake of British recruits steadily rose and then surged from late September, following the widely publicised Sack of Balbriggan.

This sudden influx of men led to a shortage of RIC uniforms, and the new recruits were issued with a mixture of dark RIC tunics and caps, and khaki army trousers. These uniforms differentiated them from both the regular RIC and the British Army, and gave rise to their nickname: "Black and Tans".

The new recruits were trained at Gormanstown Camp near Dublin, most spending two or three weeks there before being sent to RIC barracks around the country. In general, the recruits were poorly trained for police duties and received much less training than the existing Irish RIC constables.

The vast majority of Black and Tans were unemployed First World War veterans in their twenties, most of whom joined for economic reasons. The RIC offered men good wages, a chance for promotion, and the prospect of a pension. According to historian David Leeson, "The typical Black and Tan was in his early twenties and relatively short in stature. He was an unmarried Protestant from London or the Home Counties who had fought in the British Army [...] He was a working-class man with few skills". The popular Irish claim made at the time that most Black and Tans had criminal records and had been recruited straight from British prisons is incorrect, as a criminal record would disqualify one from working as a policeman.

According to Jim Herlihy, author of The Royal Irish Constabulary – A Short History and Genealogical Guide, 10,936 Black and Tans were recruited; the vast majority were born in Britain, while 883 (8%) were "Irish-born". Based on RIC recruitment data stored in the British Public Record Office at Kew, William Lowe, extrapolating from a sample of 2745 (about one quarter), estimates that 20% of Black and Tans were Irish, with just over half of these giving their religion as Catholic.

== Deployment and violence ==
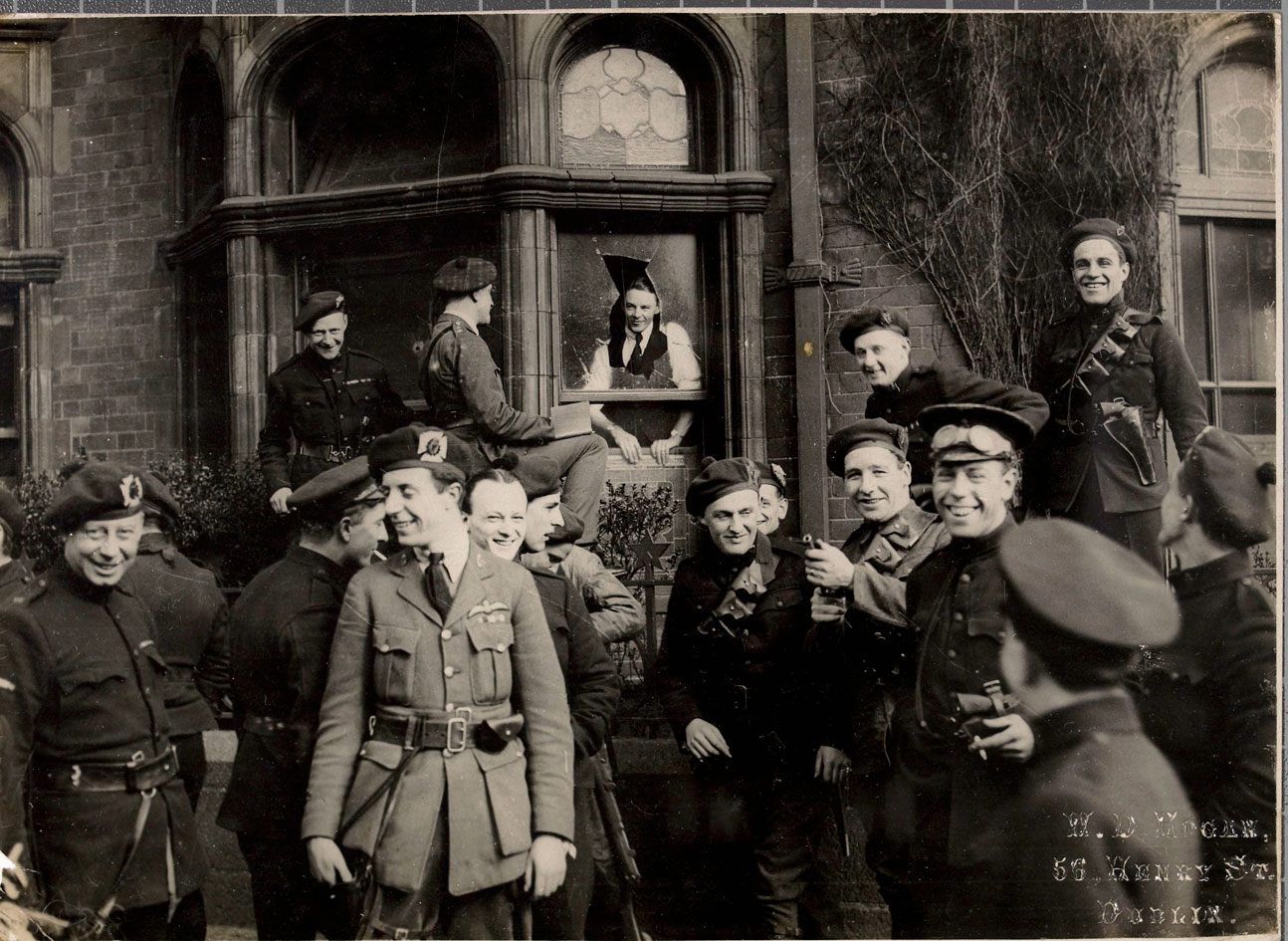
A group of Black and Tans and Auxiliaries outside the London and North Western Hotel in Dublin following an attack by the IRA, April 1921

Black and Tans served in all parts of Ireland, but most were sent to southern and western regions where the IRA was most active and fighting was heaviest. By 1921, Black and Tans made up nearly half of all RIC constables in County Tipperary, for example. Few were sent to what became Northern Ireland, however. The authorities there raised their own reserve force, the Ulster Special Constabulary. For the most part, the Black and Tans were "treated as ordinary constables, despite their strange uniforms, and they lived and worked in barracks alongside the Irish police". They spent most of their time manning police posts or on patrol—"walking, cycling, or riding on Crossley Tenders". They also undertook guard, escort and crowd control duties. While some Irish constables got along well with the Black and Tans, "it seems that many Irish police did not like their new British colleagues" and saw them as "rough". Differing discipline, dialect and ignorance of "local knowledge" contributed to an estrangement between the Black and Tans and the greater police force which at times rose to violent infighting.

Alexander Will, from Forfar in Scotland, was the first Black and Tan to die in the conflict. He was killed during an IRA attack on the RIC barracks in Rathmore, County Kerry, on 11 July 1920.

The Black and Tans soon gained a reputation for brutality. In the summer of 1920, Black and Tans began responding to IRA attacks by carrying out arbitrary reprisals against civilians, especially republicans. This usually involved the burning of homes, businesses, meeting halls and farms. Some buildings were also attacked with gunfire and grenades, and businesses were looted. Reprisals on property "were often accompanied by beatings and killings". Many villages suffered mass reprisals, including the Sack of Balbriggan (20 September), Kilkee (26 September), Trim (27 September), Tubbercurry (30 September) and Granard (31 October). Following the Rineen ambush (22 September) in which six RIC men were killed, police burned many houses in the surrounding villages of Milltown Malbay, Lahinch and Ennistymon, and killed five civilians. In early November, Black and Tans "besieged" Tralee in revenge for the IRA abduction and killing of two local RIC men. They closed all the businesses in the town, let no food in for a week and shot dead three local civilians. On 14 November, Black and Tans were suspected of abducting and murdering a Roman Catholic priest, Father Michael Griffin, in Galway. His body was found in a bog in Barna a week later. From October 1920 to July 1921, the Galway region was "remarkable in many ways", most notably the level of police brutality towards suspected IRA members, which was far above the norm in the rest of Ireland. The villages of Clifden and Knockcroghery suffered mass reprisals in March and June 1921.

Members of the British government, the British administration in Ireland, and senior officers in the RIC tacitly supported reprisals as a way of encouraging the police and scaring the population into rejecting the IRA. In December 1920, the government officially approved certain reprisals against property. There were an estimated 150 official reprisals over the next six months. Taken together with an increased emphasis on discipline in the RIC, this helped to curb the atrocities the Black and Tans committed for the remainder of the war, if only because reprisals were now directed from above rather than being the result of a spontaneous desire for revenge.

Many of the activities popularly attributed to the Black and Tans may have been committed by the Auxiliary Division or 'old' RIC constables. For instance, Tomás Mac Curtain, the Mayor of Cork, was killed in his home on the night of 19 March 1920, when few Black and Tans were stationed in the city. The coroner's inquest found that Mac Curtain had been murdered by unknown members of the RIC, and named District Inspector Oswald Swanzy as the responsible officer. The RIC transferred Swanzy from Cork to Lisburn, County Antrim for his own safety, but he was killed by the IRA on 22 August 1920. The Burning of Cork city on 11 December 1920 was carried out by K Company of the Auxiliary Division, in reprisal for an IRA ambush at Dillon's Cross. The shooting dead by Crown forces of 13 civilians at Croke Park on Bloody Sunday, in retaliation for the killing of British intelligence officers was carried out by a mixed force of military, Auxiliaries and RIC, though it is not clear who initiated the shooting. In the aftermath, "The army blamed the Auxiliaries and the Auxiliaries blamed the regular police".

=== Reaction ===
The actions of the Black and Tans alienated public opinion in both Ireland and Great Britain. Their violent tactics encouraged the Irish public to increase their covert support of the IRA, while the British public pressed for a move towards a peaceful resolution.

In January 1921, the British Labour Commission produced a report on the situation in Ireland which was highly critical of the government's security policy. It said the government, in forming the Black and Tans, had "liberated forces which it is not at present able to dominate". Edward Wood MP, better known as the future Foreign Secretary Lord Halifax, rejected force and urged the British government to make an offer to the Irish "conceived on the most generous lines". Sir John Simon MP, another future Foreign Secretary, was also horrified at the tactics being used. Lionel Curtis, writing in the imperialist journal The Round Table, wrote: "If the British Commonwealth can only be preserved by such means, it would become a negation of the principle for which it has stood". The King, senior Anglican bishops, MPs from the Liberal and Labour parties, Oswald Mosley, Jan Smuts, the Trades Union Congress and parts of the press were increasingly critical of the actions of the Black and Tans. Mahatma Gandhi said of the British peace offer: "It is not fear of losing more lives that has compelled a reluctant offer from England but it is the shame of any further imposition of agony upon a people that loves liberty above everything else".

== Disbandment ==
More than a third left the service before they were disbanded along with the rest of the RIC in 1922, an extremely high wastage rate, and well over half received government pensions. Over 500 members of the RIC died in the conflict and more than 600 were wounded. Some sources have stated that 525 police were killed in the conflict, including 152 Black and Tans and 44 Auxiliaries. This figure of total police killed would also include 72 members of the Ulster Special Constabulary killed between 1920 and 1922 and 12 members of the Dublin Metropolitan Police.

Many Black and Tans were left unemployed after the RIC was disbanded and about 3,000 were in need of financial assistance after their employment in Ireland was terminated. About 250 Black and Tans and Auxiliaries, among over 1,300 former RIC personnel, joined the Royal Ulster Constabulary. Another 700 joined the Palestine Police Force which was led by former British Chief of Police in Ireland, Henry Hugh Tudor. Others were resettled in Canada or elsewhere by the RIC Resettlement branch. Those who returned to civilian life sometimes had problems re-integrating. At least two former Black and Tans were hanged for murder in Britain and another (Scott Cullen) wanted for murder committed suicide before the police could arrest him.

== Legacy ==
Due to the enduring historical memory of the Black and Tans' violence, historian David Leeson describes them as "the most notorious police in the history of the British Isles". One of the best known Irish Republican songs is Dominic Behan's "Come Out, Ye Black and Tans". The Irish War of Independence is sometimes referred to as the "Tan War" or "Black-and-Tan War". This term was preferred by those who fought on the anti-Treaty side in the Irish Civil War and is still used by Republicans today. The "Cogadh na Saoirse" ("War of Independence") medal, awarded since 1941 by the Irish government to IRA veterans of the War of Independence, bears a ribbon with two vertical stripes in black and tan.

In 2020, Justice Minister Charlie Flanagan proposed a commemoration ceremony for those who had served in the Royal Irish Constabulary. This resulted in widespread criticism due to the Black and Tans being members of the RIC; many officials announced that they would not appear and refused to participate. Flanagan decided to cancel the ceremony due to the controversy.
