= Ballinalee =

Village in County Longford, Ireland

Ballinalee Béal Átha na Lao
- Village
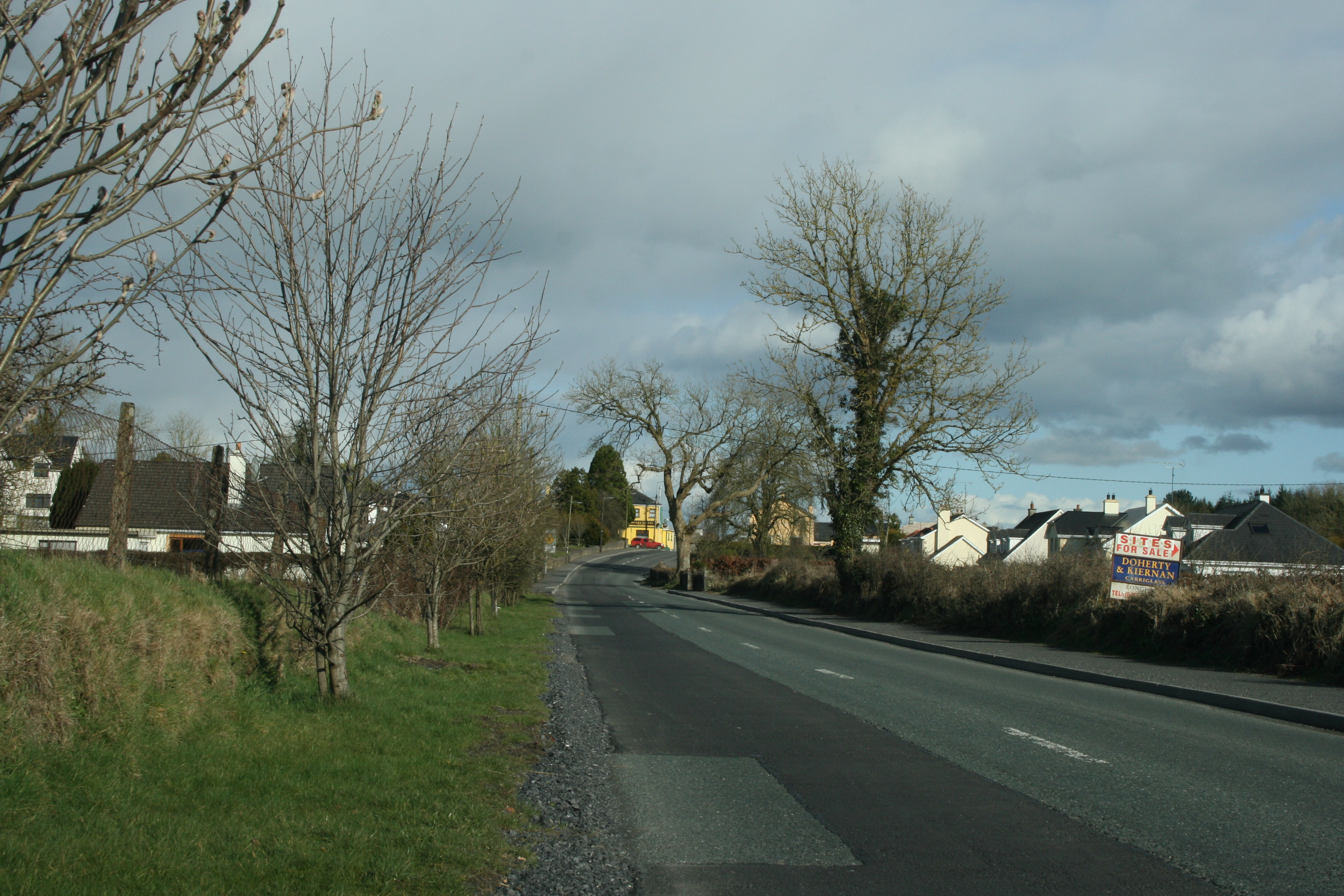
- Approaching the village on the R194

- Location in Ireland
- Coordinates: 53.77562°N 7.65801°W
- Country: Ireland
- Province: Leinster
- County: County Longford

Population (2016)
  - Total: 347

Ballinalee (Irish: Béal Átha na Lao), sometimes known as Saint Johnstown, is a village in north County Longford, Ireland. It is situated on the River Camlin, and falls within the civil parish of Clonbroney. The village is 10 km northeast of Longford town (12 km by road). As of the 2016 census, it had a population of 347 people.

== Name ==
The village name in Irish, Béal Átha na Lao or Béal Átha na Laogh (anglicised as Ballinalee), may be translated as "mouth of the ford of the calves". The village is also sometimes known as Saint Johnstown, a name associated with the local Church of Ireland church of St John.

== History ==
To the south of Ballinalee is Currygrane Lough, which spans the townlands of Drummeel and Currygrane, and contains several possible crannog sites. Another lake, Gurteen Lake or Gorteen Lough, is also situated near the village.

Within the surrounding parish is the ruins of Old Clonbroney; The convent built here was reputedly the first such convent in Ireland. It is traditionally associated with St Patrick and Guasacht (Bishop of Granard) and was founded c. 440 AD.

Henry Hughes Wilson was born in the area in 1864, and would become the British Chief of the Imperial General Staff before his assassination by Irish Republicans. He was born in Currygrane near the village.

It was nominally represented in the Irish House of Commons by the borough constituency of St Johnstown. In 1833, the Commissioners appointed by the UK Parliament to inquire into municipal corporations in Ireland reported that the corporation of the borough was "virtually extinct". The 1846 Parliamentary Gazetteer records:

It stands on the Camolin rivulet, and on the road from Granard to Longford, 6 miles west-south-west of Granard, 6 north-northwest of Edgeworthstown, and 6 north-east by east of Longford. It is a poor and miserable place,—a small daub caricature of even a rotten borough. In 1833, it contained only a new police barrack, a cottage ornée in course of erection by a gentleman who had acquired some of the burgess-freeholds, 5 houses of annual value between £5 and £10, and 40 houses of annual value less than £5. The charter, which incorporated it was granted in the third year of Charles II.; assigned 88 acres of land as the site and property of the town; ordered the place, still then only in posse, to be called the Borough and Town of St. Johnstown; appointed it a corporation, consisting of a sovereign, 11 other burgesses, and an unnamed number of free commons; gave that corporation the power of sending two members to parliament; and granted a weekly market on Tuesday, and annual fairs on May 1 and 2, and Nov. 11 and 12. The Earl of Granard eventually carried the borough in his pocket, and in consequence received the £15,000 of compensation for disfranchisement at the Legislative Union [..] A grey friary, dedicated to St. John the Baptist, is supposed to have stood on the site of the town; but, if it ever existed, it has become completely untraceable. Area, 11 acres. Pop., in 1831, 255; in 1841, 299. Houses 50.

—

In 1798, the town was the scene of numerous summary executions of United Irish prisoners of war after the Battle of Ballinamuck in a field now called "Bully's Acre".

A poem by Antoine Ó Raifteirí (1779–1835), titled "The Lass From Bally-na-Lee", references the town.

During the Irish War of Independence (1919–1921), the town was the scene of the Battle of Ballinalee, where IRA leader Seán Mac Eoin (sometimes known as the Blacksmith of Ballinalee) was the leader of a well-equipped flying column known as the North Longford Flying Column. They defeated 100 members of the Black and Tans and the Auxiliary Division in Ballinalee on 4 November 1920. It was the only successful defence of a town by the IRA against Crown forces during the entire conflict.

Between 30 and 31 January 1953, a riot took place at the post office. The position of postmistress was re-appointed due to unscrupulous business activities. Fine Gael TD Seán Mac Eoin supported the position of the former post mistress. A riot ensued also in support, causing damage and assault to the family and home of the newly appointed post mistress.

== Amenities ==
The local Church of Ireland church is dedicated to St. John. This church was built to designs by the Cork-born architect John Hargrave and was completed in 1825.

There are two Roman Catholic churches in the parish; the Church of the Holy Trinity in the village and the Church of St James in Clonbroney. Ballinalee was the site of the first convent in Ireland at Old Clonbroney. Its remains are still to be seen.

The parochial hall on the Granard road, was opened in 1939 and is dedicated to the memory of Thomas Ashe, the Irish patriot. The local national school is adjacent to the hall and is named after Saint Samhthann.

Rose Cottage, the building from which Mac Eoin coordinated IRA forces during the Battle of Ballinalee, was opened to the public as an exhibition centre in 2023.

== Transport ==
Donnelly's Pioneer Bus Service, a local bus company based in Granard, operate a route from Granard to Longford via Ballinalee. There are three journeys each way daily (no Sunday service)

== Sport ==
The village's Gaelic Athletic Association team, Sean Connollys GAA Club, primarily plays Gaelic football. The club is named after Sean Connolly, the former IRA member who was born in 1890 near the club's grounds and died in the Selton Hill ambush in 1921.

The club's grounds, located on France Road, also has an 18-hole pitch-and-putt course (known as "The Acres"), a basketball and tennis court, concrete walkway, a gymnasium and a meeting room. The underage section of the club goes under the name of the parish, Clonbroney. The club won the Senior Football Championship for the only time in 1919 as Clonbroney Camlin Rovers (later renamed Seán Connollys).

Community Games and soccer are also participated in at parish level.

== Notable people ==
- Micheál Carrigy, Fine Gael politician
- Seán Mac Eoin (1893–1973), IRA leader and later Minister for Defence
- Henry Wilson (1864–1922), British Army Field Marshal

== See also ==
- List of towns and villages in Ireland
