= Battle of Ballinalee =

Gun battle between British forces and the IRA

- Part of the Irish War of Independence
Date	4 November 1920
Location	Ballinalee, County Longford
Result	IRA victory

Belligerents
Irish Republican Army	United Kingdom

Commanders and leaders
Seán Mac Eoin	Unknown

Units involved
North Longford Flying Column (IRA)	Royal Irish Constabulary

Strength
~4	~100

Casualties and losses
None	Unknown (perhaps 20)

The Battle of Ballinalee took place during the Irish War of Independence on 4 November 1920. Members of the Irish Republican Army (IRA), led by Seán Mac Eoin, drove a mixed group of Crown forces consisting of Black and Tans and Auxiliary Division personnel from the village of Ballinalee in County Longford.

Crown forces hoped to burn the town as a reprisal for the deaths of several RIC personnel in the preceding days. This included the killing of an RIC inspector, Philip St Johnstone Howlett Kelleher, the previous week and an RIC Constable, Peter Cooney, the previous day. Cooney had been suspected of being a spy and his execution was reputedly ordered by Michael Collins. At the time of his killing, Cooney was allegedly carrying coded dispatches with the names of Longford IRA men.

The Crown forces (numbering 100 men in 11 trucks) were defeated by about 25 IRA members, of which 4 were involved in the main battle. Mac Eoin had placed several groups at the roads leading into the village, including one at a house, Rose Cottage, on the approach to the village centre. This group, referred to in some sources as the "Rose Cottage Four", engaged the much larger RIC force using rifle fire and grenades, and forced their retreat.

== Museum ==
Rose Cottage, the building from which Mac Eoin coordinated the defence of the village, was developed into an exhibition centre and opened to the public in November 2023.

== See also ==
- North Longford Flying Column
