= Clonfin Ambush =

Ambush during the Irish War of Independence

- Part of the Irish War of Independence
Date	2 February 1921
Location	Clonfin, County Longford, Ireland 53.761°N 7.584°W
Result	IRA victory

Belligerents
Irish Republican Army (North Longford Brigade)	(United Kingdom of Great Britain and Ireland) Royal Irish Constabulary (Auxiliary Division)

Commanders and leaders
Seán Mac Eoin	(United Kingdom of Great Britain and Ireland) Francis Craven †

Strength
21 volunteers	~19 men in 2 lorries; reinforcements of ~150 men in 14 lorries arrive later

Casualties and losses
None	4 killed 8 wounded
- Location within island of Ireland

The Clonfin Ambush was an ambush carried out by the Irish Republican Army (IRA) on 2 February 1921, during the Irish War of Independence. It took place in the townland of Clonfin (or Cloonfin) between Ballinalee and Granard in County Longford. The IRA ambushed two lorries carrying members of the British Auxiliary Division, sparking a lengthy gun battle in which four Auxiliaries were killed and eight wounded. The Auxiliaries eventually surrendered and their weapons were seized. The IRA commander, Seán Mac Eoin, won some praise for helping the wounded Auxiliaries. Following the ambush, British forces burned a number of houses and farms in the area, and shot dead an elderly farmer.

== Background ==
The IRA's North Longford Flying Column, 21 strong and led by Seán Mac Eoin, had been formed in late 1920. In that year they had killed four Royal Irish Constabulary (RIC) constables. In November, a company of the Auxiliary Division—a paramilitary police force made up of ex-military officers—had been stationed in the county to put down the local IRA, and were reinforced in January 1921. Whereas previously the IRA had tried to operate in relatively large numbers, often attacking police barracks, from this point on, their GHQ in Dublin ordered smaller but more frequent attacks to be made.

The ambush site, on the road between Granard and Ballinalee, was well chosen. Mac Eoin selected a position where the ambushers had excellent cover and were barely visible to the British. The plan was to explode a mine as the lorries passed. The British assessment was that, "the ambush was most cleverly laid"

== The ambush ==
The IRA detonated the roadside improvised explosive device as two British lorries were passing a bridge, killing the driver of the first lorry instantly. The IRA unit then opened fire on the lorries, triggering a fire-fight of two hours. One of the Auxiliaries got away and managed to summon reinforcements.

During the fighting, four members of the IRA party worked their way around the flank of the Auxiliaries, killing their commander, Lt. Commander Francis Craven. After his death, the remaining policemen surrendered. A total of four Auxiliaries had been killed and eight wounded.

MacEoin's treatment of his prisoners was humane. He congratulated them on the fight they had put up and prevented his fighters from assaulting the Auxiliaries. He also had water brought from nearby houses for the British wounded. When he was later captured by the British, three Auxiliaries testified at his court martial to his generous treatment of them at Clonfin. Mac Eoin's humane treatment reportedly delayed the IRA's getaway and they were almost caught by 14 lorries of British reinforcements as they escaped across Clonfin Wood. The IRA had captured 18 rifles, 20 revolvers ammunition, a Lewis gun and 800 rounds of ammunition.

== Aftermath ==
In the aftermath of the ambush, British forces raided the nearby towns of Killoe, Ballinamuck, Drumlish, Ballinalee, Edgeworthstown, Granard and Ardagh. A number of houses and farms were burnt. They shot dead an elderly farmer, Michael Farrell, in reprisal for the ambush.

The flying column laid low after the ambush and did not attempt any more attacks until the end of the month. MacEoin was captured at Mullingar railway station in early March and charged with the murder of RIC DI MGrath. He was released in July under the terms of the Truce which ended hostilities. In his absence, the Longford IRA were not able to sustain the intensity of their campaign.

A memorial was later erected at the site of the ambush. The IRA combatants were: Seán Mac Eoin (Ballinalee), Sean Duffy (Ballinalee), James J. Brady (Ballinamuck), Tom Brady (Cartronmarkey), Paddy Callaghan (Clonbroney), Seamus Conway (Clonbroney), Pat Cooke (Tubber), Seamus Farrelly (Purth), Paddy Finnegan (Molly), Larry Geraghty (Ballymore), Mick Gormley (Killoe), Hugh Hourican (Clonbroney), Jack Hughes (Scrabby), Mick Kenny (Clonbroney), Paddy Lynch (Colmcille), John McDowell (Clonbroney), Jack Moore (Streete), Mick Mulligan (Willsbrook), Michael F. Reynolds (Killoe), Sean Sexton (Ballinalee) and Jim Sheeran (Killoe).
