= Rathcoole ambush =

1921 ambush during the Irish War of Independence

- Part of the Irish War of Independence
| Date | 16 June 1921 |
| Location | Near Rathcoole, County Cork 52.088580°N 8.995028°W |
| Result | (See aftermath) |

Belligerents
| (Irish Republic) Irish Republican Army | (United Kingdom of Great Britain and Ireland) Royal Irish Constabulary (Auxiliary Division) |

Commanders and leaders
| (Irish Republic) Paddy O'Brien | (United Kingdom of Great Britain and Ireland) William Edward Crossey (WIA) |

Units involved
| 2nd (North) Cork Brigade | L Company ADRIC |

Strength
| 120–140 (Note: Many accounts from former IRA volunteers involved in the ambush put the number at 120 men. Paddy O’Brien, the overall commander during the engagement, also placed the number at 120 men in his witness statement. However, in an article he wrote for An Cosantóir, O’Brien gave a different number, stating that the IRA’s total strength was 140 men consisting of: 61 riflemen, 50 men armed with shotguns, 14 engineers, 4 staff officiers, 6 signallers, 2 medics with 3 men crewing the machine gun.) volunteers | 25 constables |

Casualties and losses
| None | 2 killed 14 wounded 2 vehicles damaged |
- Location within Ireland

The Rathcoole ambush (Irish: Luíochán Ráth Cúil) was an ambush carried out by the Irish Republican Army (IRA) near the village of Rathcoole in County Cork on 16 June 1921 during the Irish War of Independence. Under the command of Paddy O'Brien, the IRA's 2nd Cork Brigade attacked an armed convoy of the Auxiliary Division returning to their barracks in Millstreet after collecting supplies. After 50 minutes of intense fighting, the IRA managed to inflict heavy casualties on the Auxiliaries before a shortage of ammunition forced them to withdraw. The Rathcoole ambush was one of the largest engagements of the war, and was the last major ambush to be carried out in the county.

== Background ==
After the railway line leading to Millstreet had been cut by the IRA in several different places, the Auxiliary Division's L Company stationed in Mount Leader House was forced to travel in convoys to the railway station in Banteer to collect their supplies. Each convoy was escorted by armoured cars with the Crossley tenders each carrying a Lewis gun to provide further protection. As many roads and bridges in the area had been sabotaged by the IRA, the only route the Auxiliaries could take was the Millstreet–Banteer road. In May, following a meeting by the leaders of the 2nd Cork Brigade's Millstreet battalion, the republicans decided to ambush the convoy.

After monitoring the route for 12 days and recording the Auxiliaries' movements, the IRA noticed that the size and strength of the convoy could vary each trip, with the smallest composed of 2 Crossley tenders carrying 20 personnel and the largest consisting of 6 vehicles and 40 men. Due to the presence of armoured cars and the possibility of facing a British convoy at full strength, the IRA decided to use mines for the operation. As armoured cars were beginning to see more extensive use by Crown forces, the column had been training its men throughout the Spring in the manufacturing and deployment of mines as a means of countering them. 16 June was chosen as the day for the attack as the republicans believed the British would make two trips that day. It was also decided that they would only attack the second convoy returning in the evening, as the setting sun would allow the column to successfully withdraw.

The IRA chose a site along the Millstreet−Banteer road about a mile from the village of Rathcoole. The site gave the IRA an advantageous position; to the south of the road was an elevated position, which could provide the volunteers with natural cover, and a pine wood that would allow them to observe the Auxiliaries without being spotted. On 14 June, the IRA commanders sent messages to the brigade's other battalions in Newmarket, Kanturk, Mallow and Charleville requesting that they send all available men to the Rathcoole area. After the battalions had assembled the following day, the IRA force commanded by Paddy O'Brien numbered upwards of 140 men armed with rifles, shotguns and a Hotchkiss machine gun. Parts of the column also worked on creating barricades which were to be used as road blocks once the engagement commenced.

== Ambush ==
On the morning of 16 June, the IRA laid 6 5–7 pound mines along the road, spacing each one about 150 yards apart. At around 10:30 a.m., the first of the 2 convoys was sighted, but was allowed to pass without incident. The British again drove through the ambush site at about 4:30 p.m.; the convoy consisted of 3 Crossley tenders with an armoured Lancia leading at the front and carried 25 personnel. At 5 p.m., the volunteers moved to their positions in preparation for the convoy's return. O'Brien divided the column into 10 sections: 8 of the sections were situated in the hill and woods overlooking the road, with the remaining 2 assigned to the north to prevent the British from taking cover behind the stonewalls. 6 of the southern sections and 1 from the north covered each mine along the road with the remaining sections assigned to protect the flanks. The IRA planned to have each section target a certain vehicle, this way they could pin down each of the lorries and prevent the Auxiliaries from consolidating and fighting as a whole unit.

When the Auxiliaries arrived back at the area on their return trip, the volunteers held off from attacking the first 3 lorries in the convoy and waited until the fourth vehicle had reached the sixth mine. Once the Crossley tender was in position, the mine was detonated; however, due to the ground being too soft, the blast was absorbed and only disabled the vehicle. The volunteers immediately opened fire on the stricken lorry, pinning down the Auxiliaries and preventing them from leaving their vehicle. The IRA also opened fire with their Hotchkiss machine gun, though they were later forced to discontinue using it due to jamming. At the same time, the Lancia, which was travelling at the front of the convoy, turned around to assist, but was also disabled after it drove over another mine. The volunteers then attempted to assault the fourth lorry, but were forced back by machine gunfire from the third lorry.

Despite being taken completely by surprise, the Auxiliaries managed to form defensive positions by taking cover in and around their vehicles. They immediately began firing towards the IRA's positions with their Lewis guns, but due to the terrain providing the volunteers with natural protection they failed to inflict any casualties. However, due to the intensity of the machine gun fire, the IRA were not able to advance beyond their positions. Attempting to outflank the republican positions, a group of 5 Auxiliaries from the third lorry left their vehicle and began making their way up the road. Upon seeing this, the volunteers set off another of their mines as the Auxiliaries were passing over it, incapacitating 3 of them. The remaining 2 men who weren't affected by the blast began firing towards the IRA before both of them were eventually shot.

After recognising the precarious situation he was faced with, the commander of the convoy William Edward Crossey ordered one of his men, Francis Scott, to run back to their barracks in Millstreet and alert the rest of their company. Despite coming under heavy gunfire during the initial part of his journey, Scott managed to reach Mount Leader House and reinforcements were immediately sent to relieve the convoy. However, whilst driving to the ambush site, the relief force found that the road was blocked by 3 cut-down trees. Subsequently, some of the men then began making their way on foot but would arrive after the ambush had ended.

At around this time, the IRA's supply of ammunition was becoming exhausted as each man only carried 40 rounds with them. After around 50 minutes of fighting, the republicans disengaged and began making their way along pre-planned lines of retreat. British reports at the time attributed the IRA's withdrawal to an aircraft which was flying nearby; however, most republican sources make no mention of a plane. Out of the 25 men that were in the convoy, the Auxiliaries suffered 16 casualties, of which 2 were killed and 14 wounded. The IRA on the other hand did not suffer a single casualty.

== Aftermath ==
The IRA considered the ambush to be a success. In an article for An Cosantóir, Paddy O'Brien wrote that: "...[W]hilst no war material was captured at the time, we achieved our object in inflicting casualties upon the enemy, and in shaking his morale; while at the same time we strengthened the confidence of our own men, both in their own ability, and in the efficiency of the landmine, of which they had heard bad reports previously." Despite this success, the republicans used up a significant portion of their already small ammunition supply during the fight. However, this was rectified the following day when an IRA detachment sent back to the ambush site to retrieve the undetonated mines discovered 1,350 rounds of ammunition abandoned by the Auxiliaries whilst they were clearing up the area.

Despite suffering heavy casualties, Crossey was pleased with how his men performed during the ambush. In his after-action report, Crossey stated:

"I cannot speak too highly of the way in which my party behaved, outmanoeuvred as they were by twelve to one; (Note: Crossey estimated the IRA's strength to be around 300.) not overlooking the fact that at the commencement of the action, the occupants of each car had to fight as detached groups, until such time as they were able to concentrate. During the whole of the engagement, the discipline of the cadets was perfect. There not being the slightest sign of panic or nerves as might easily have occurred, owing to the sudden nature of the onslaught."

For their actions during the ambush, constables Crossey and Scott as well as William Kay and Henry W. T. George were awarded the Constabulary Medal.

=== Reprisals ===
On 24 June, about 1,000 British troops from the towns of Macroom, Kanturk, Tralee, Ballincollig, Ballyvonaire, Buttevant and Killarney carried out large-scale searches around the Rathcoole area. On the same day, the Auxiliaries arrested and killed IRA volunteer Michael Dineen. According to IRA accounts, Dineen was reportedly tortured by the Auxiliaries before having some his bones broken and being repeatedly shot. On 1 July, Auxiliaries shot dead Bernard Moynihan, another volunteer, and burned down Rathcoole wood. The IRA then began making plans for an attack on Mount Leader House, but these were postponed due to the announcement of the truce on 11 July.
