= Hugh Tudor =

British soldier (1871–1965)

Major-General Sir Hugh Tudor KCB CMG
- Born: 14 March 1871; Devon, England
- Died: 25 September 1965 (aged 94); St. John's, Newfoundland, Canada
- Military career
- Allegiance: United Kingdom
- Branch: British Army
- Service years: 1890–1924
- Rank: Major-General
- Commands: Palestine Command; 9th (Scottish) Division
- Conflicts: Second Boer War; First World War; Anglo-Irish War
- Awards: Knight Commander of the Order of the Bath; Companion of the Order of St Michael and St George; Mentioned in Despatches; Commander of the Order of Leopold (Belgium); Croix de Guerre

Major-General Sir Henry Hugh Tudor, KCB, CMG (14 March 1871 – 25 September 1965) was a British Army officer who fought as a junior officer in the Second Boer War (1899–1902), and as a senior officer in the First World War (1914–18), but is now remembered chiefly for his roles in the Irish War of Independence (1919–21) as Inspector General and Chief of the Royal Irish Constabulary and the Palestine Police.

== Early life and education ==
Tudor was born in Newton Abbot, Devon, in 1871, the only surviving son of Rev. Harry Tudor (1832–1907), rector of Wolborough with Newton Abbot (1865–88), rector and patron of Lustleigh, Newton Abbot (1888–1904), and sub-dean (1903–7) and prebendary (1885–1907) of Exeter Cathedral, and his wife, Charlotte Aurora, younger daughter of Rev. Frederic Ensor, rector and patron of Lustleigh, Newton Abbot. The Ensors were a minor landed gentry family, of Rollesby Hall, near Norwich, Norfolk.

Tudor enrolled in the Royal Military Academy, Woolwich in 1888.

== Early career: India and South Africa ==
Tudor was commissioned a second lieutenant in the Royal Horse Artillery on 25 July 1890. He was stationed in India from 1890 until 1897, when he returned to England, having been promoted to lieutenant on 25 July 1893.

Tudor was sent to South Africa during the Second Boer War, where he was badly wounded at the Battle of Magersfontein (11 December 1899), but recovered and returned to duty, and was promoted to captain on 7 February 1900. He served as divisional adjutant and was mentioned in despatches (including the final despatch by Lord Kitchener dated 23 June 1902). After the end of the war, Tudor stayed in South Africa for another six months, returning to Southampton on the SS Orcana in January 1903. His extensive service was reflected by his campaign medals: the Queen's South Africa Medal with four clasps, and the King's South Africa Medal with two.

In the following years, Tudor went back to India for another five years (1905–10), and then was posted to Egypt, where he stayed until the start of the First World War.

== First World War ==
Tudor served during the Great War on the Western Front from December 1914 to the armistice of 11 November 1918, rising from the rank of captain in charge of an artillery battery, to temporary brigadier general in February 1916 and being a brigadier general, Royal Artillery, to the rank of temporary major general and the command of the 9th (Scottish) Division. He continued to command this formation after the armistice, as part of the British Army of the Rhine, until the 9th Division was disbanded in March 1919.

Tudor was a professional and forward-looking artilleryman: historian Paddy Griffith has described him as an "expert tactician." He was a fighting general who spent a lot of time on the front lines: he was almost killed at the Third Battle of Ypres in October 1917, when a shell fragment hit him in the head and smashed his helmet. He was the first British general to use smoke shells to create screens and one of the first advocates of predicted artillery fire. He suggested an attack in the Cambrai sector in July 1917, and his artillery ideas helped lay the foundation for the British breakthrough in the battle there in November. In addition, he was almost captured by the Germans during Operation Michael, the first German offensive in the spring of 1918.

== Ireland ==
After the 9th Division was disbanded, Tudor, promoted in June 1919 to substantive major general, was posted once again to Egypt and India. In May 1920, however, he was appointed 'Police Adviser' to the Dublin Castle administration in Ireland and promoted to Lieutenant-General. His chief qualification for this post was his friendship with the Secretary of State for War, Winston Churchill. Tudor had met Churchill in Bangalore in 1895, and the two men became lifelong friends. During the brief period when Churchill had served as an infantry officer on the Western Front in early 1916, he was posted to the same sector as Tudor, near Ploegsteert Wood.

=== Situation in Ireland ===
When Tudor took up his new post, the Irish War of Independence was approaching a crisis: indeed, within a couple of months, the British administration in Ireland was on the verge of collapse. The Royal Irish Constabulary's morale and effective strength were both declining: Irish Republican Army guerrillas were ambushing police patrols, burning police barracks and organising boycotts of police and their families. Railway workers went on strike, refusing to move trains that carried armed police or troops. Merchants refused to serve police customers. Police recruits and servants were being attacked and intimidated, and women who were friendly with the police had their hair cut off. Police property was wrecked and stolen: in some cases, police bicycles were taken away while their owners were in church. Hundreds of police officers resigned both as a result of intimidation and in protest at the government's repeated mass releases of IRA prisoners, which continued up until the spring of 1920.

Meanwhile, Sinn Féin was building an alternative state — the Irish Republic proclaimed during the Easter Rising of 1916. Local governments were acknowledging the authority of the First Dáil. IRA Volunteers were acting as Republican police. Republican courts were adjudicating both civil and criminal cases. In some parts of Ireland, the Republic was becoming a reality.

Tudor's assignment, as he saw it, was to raise police morale, punish crime and restore law and order: "I had nothing to do with politics," he wrote years later, "and don't care a hoop of hell what measure of Home Rule they got." In June 1920, Tudor did feel the stress of the violence in Ireland. He stated that when he travelled around Ireland, he had to keep a revolver across his knees and never knew when he might be shot at. At a Cabinet conference on 23 July 1920, his Dublin Castle colleagues were calling for an offer of "Dominion Home Rule" (i.e. Canadian-style self-government, within the Empire, as opposed to the devolved Parliament within the UK which was due to have become law in 1914 and was eventually elected in May 1921). However, Tudor was confident that "given the proper support, it would be possible to crush the present campaign of outrage. The whole country was intimidated," he said, "and would thank God for strong measures."

The government chose the hard line: on 9 August 1920, Parliament passed the Restoration of Order in Ireland Act, which gave Dublin Castle the power to govern by regulation; to replace the criminal courts with courts martial; to replace coroners' inquests with military courts of inquiry; and to punish disaffected local governments by withholding grants of money.

=== Tudor's leadership ===
As Police Adviser, Tudor assumed control of Ireland's police forces, and eventually styled himself "Chief of Police". Under his administration, the police were militarised: indeed, at the Cabinet conference of 23 July 1920, Tudor had conceded that the RIC would soon become ineffective as a police force; "but as a military body he thought they might have great effect." Like his patron, Churchill, Tudor gave police posts to his military friends and colleagues: Brigadier-General Ormonde Winter, for example, became Deputy Police Adviser and Head of Intelligence; "He had once been my Captain in a battery at Rawalpindi," said Tudor, "and we had done a lot of racing together at various meetings in India."

The beleaguered RIC was reinforced with British ex-soldiers and sailors—the notorious 'Black and Tans'. With the army stretched very thin by the deployment of 2 extra divisions to Iraq, and the threatened British coal strike in September 1920, Tudor created the Auxiliary Division, a temporary gendarmerie composed of ex-officers and commanded by a pair of experienced colonial warriors: Brigadier-General Frank Percy Crozier and Brigadier-General E. A. Wood; its numbers peaked at 1,500 in July 1921. General Crozier resigned on 25 February 1921 after Tudor countermanded his actions against twenty-six Auxiliaries who were accused of ransacking a store in County Meath on the night of 9 February 1921. Crozier claimed that Tudor knew of and condoned those types of activities.

=== Reprisals and indiscipline ===
While working hard to rebuild the RIC's numbers and morale, Tudor did comparatively little to restore its discipline. When police and auxiliaries were killed in ambushes and attacks, their comrades often responded with reprisals against Irish Republicans and their communities: some of these reprisals were spontaneous "police riots," but others were organised and led by local police officials. Tudor's own response to these outbreaks of arson and murder was weak and ambiguous: in a memorandum on discipline dated 12 November 1920, Tudor admonished his men to maintain "the highest discipline", while reassuring them that they would have "the fullest support in the most drastic action against that band of assassins, the so-called IRA."

Sir Nevil Macready (Commander-in-Chief, Ireland) had been initially impressed by Tudor (June 1920) and thought he was getting rid of "incompetent idiots" from senior police positions. Macready and the CIGS Sir Henry Wilson became increasingly concerned that Tudor, with the connivance of Lloyd George, who loved to drop hints to that effect, was operating an unofficial policy of killing IRA men in reprisal for the deaths of pro-Crown forces. However Macready also told Wilson that the Army was arranging "accidents" for suspected IRA men, but not telling the politicians as he did not want them "talked and joked about after dinner by Cabinet Ministers". Tudor's complicity in the reprisals was implied by Macready when he wrote that "assassination is rife and the G.S. [General Staff] have now adopted it à la Tudor and Co." By 1921, relations between the British military (under Macready) and the police (under Tudor) were strained. Tudor was said to have felt that the police had been blamed for all of the reprisals, while many had been carried out by the military. The lack of control over the RIC/Black and Tans was pointed out by British General Sir Hubert Gough: "...it is impossible to come to any other honest opinion...but that the police in many cases and the soldiers in some, have been guilty of gross acts of violence, without even a semblance of military order and discipline, and that these acts are not only never adequately punished, but no steps are taken to prevent their recurrence." On 17 August 1920 Macready had a Special General Order issued which warned that the severest disciplinary measures would be taken for any signs of looting or retaliation. Tudor was to issue a parallel order to Macready's forbidding retaliation, but he delayed its issuance. Tudor did authorize the publication of a weekly bulletin (Weekly Summary) which documented the major incidents that the RIC were involved in. This weekly summary became regarded as an encouragement for reprisals. In November he finally did call for tighter discipline not through an official order but in the form of a memorandum for the "information and guidance" of the RIC.

Bloody Sunday (Irish: Domhnach na Fola) was a day of violence in Dublin on 21 November 1920, during the Irish War of Independence. More than 30 people were killed or fatally wounded. The day began with an Irish Republican Army operation, organised by Michael Collins, to assassinate members of the "Cairo Gang" – a team of undercover British intelligence agents working and living in Dublin. IRA members went to a number of addresses and killed or fatally wounded 16 men, mostly British Army intelligence officers. Five other men were wounded. Later that afternoon, in retaliation, members of the Auxiliary Division and RIC opened fire on the crowd at a Gaelic football match in Croke Park, killing or fatally wounding fourteen civilians and wounding at least sixty others. After a Roman Catholic priest was shot dead by an insane Auxiliary in December 1920, a Castle official noted in his diary that he felt some sympathy for the killer, "as these men have undoubtedly been influenced by what they have taken as the passive approval of their officers from Tudor downwards to believe that they will never be punished for anything."

After the killing of 17 Auxiliaries in an ambush at Macroom, County Cork, martial law was declared (10 December 1920) in the four Munster Counties of Cork, Tipperary, Kerry and Limerick. On 23 December, Irish Home Rule became law, to the delight of the Opposition Asquith Liberal faction and Labour Party. On 29 December, Tudor attended a special Cabinet conference, along with Wilson, Macready and John Anderson (Head of the Civil Service in Dublin), who all advised that no truce should be allowed for elections to the planned Dublin Parliament, and that at least four months of martial law would be required to restore order: the date for the elections was therefore set for May 1921. Martial law was then extended over the rest of Munster (Counties Waterford and Clare) and part of Leinster (Counties Kilkenny and Wexford).

By this time, however, reprisals had become a scandal in Britain. In the first half of 1921, police discipline improved, and police reprisals became less common, but this improvement came too late: the political damage was irreversible. In addition, Macready thought the RIC had become unreliable and had lost confidence in Tudor, who was also being criticised by Robertson, under whom he had previously served on the Rhine.

The Irish War of Independence reached a climax in the first half of 1921, with deaths of Crown forces running at approximately double the rate of those in the second half of 1920. However IRA losses were also mounting with many of their key members captured and the organisation critically short of funds and ammunition: IRA leader Michael Collins would later describe them to Chief Secretary of Ireland Hamar Greenwood as 'dead beat' and 'within six weeks of defeat' by the summer of 1921. By May 1921, it was clear however, that the Government's strategy of combining limited repression with limited concessions was not working.

With the Irish elections and the potential Triple Alliance strike in Britain out of the way, an extra 17 army battalions were sent (bringing British strength up to 60,000) in June and July 1921; but the politicians drew back from the brink, and faced with the choice of either waging a war of reconquest or negotiating peace with the insurgents, they opened secret talks with James Craig and Éamon de Valera. A Truce was agreed in July 1921, and a Treaty signed in December. Whilst the Anglo-Irish Treaty would prove acceptable to the British government and Irish Unionists, its terms prompted a vicious conflict between Irish Republicans resulting in the Irish Civil War.

== Palestine ==
Tudor remained Chief of Police until his forces had been demobilised and the RIC was disbanded. In February 1922, Churchill (who was now Secretary of State for the Colonies) appointed his friend to a new post in the troubled Mandatory Palestine – General Officer Commanding and Inspector-General of Police and Prisons, with the temporary rank of air vice marshal. Tudor was in the process of raising a British Gendarmerie for the territory at the time, which was overwhelmingly recruited from amongst former Black and Tans and Auxiliaries. He arrived in Palestine to assume the role in June but his refusal to properly manage his dual civil and military responsibilities resulted in his effective dismissal. He left Palestine in March 1924 and handed over to Air Commodore Eugene Gerrard; he relinquished his temporary commission as an air vice marshal on 26 April 1924.

== Later life ==
In 1923, Tudor was made a Knight Commander of the Order of the Bath. In 1924, he retired both from his position as Palestine's Director of Public Safety, and from the Army; having been the youngest Major General to ever attain that rank in the British Army. He then emigrated to Newfoundland and began working for Ryan & Company, a fish merchant in Bonavista. He later moved to St. John's and worked for George M. Barr's fishing industry and resided with Barr's family in Churchill Square in St. John’s.

In the 1950s, Tudor's presence in Newfoundland became known to the Irish Republican Army, and two of its members were sent to St. John's to assassinate him. Their planned assassination was not carried out after consultations with a local Catholic priest, Rev. Joseph McDermott, who informed them that their escape plan was bound to fail.

== Media ==
In 2012, Newfoundland-based independent audio programme producers, Battery Radio, produced a story on Tudor, entitled 'A Bullet For The General'. The programme was broadcast on RTÉ Radio in January 2012, on CBC Radio in March 2012 and ABC Radio National in June 2013.

== Personal life ==
Tudor married in 1903 Eva Gertrude Josephine Edwards; she was the only daughter of Lea Priestley Edwards, of Warberry Court, Torquay, Devon, and his first cousin Emily Gertrude, daughter of Conservative politician Sir Henry Edwards, 1st Baronet. They had one son and three daughters.

Tudor died of natural causes in St. John's on 25 September 1965. His body lies in the Anglican Cemetery on Forest Road in St. John's.

== Sources ==
- Cave, Joy, MS. A Gallant Gunner General: The Life and Times of Sir H H Tudor, KCB, CMG, Together with an Edited Version of his 1914–1918 War Diary, "The Fog of War". Imperial War Museum, Misc 175 Item 2658.
- Coogan, Tim Pat (18 October 2002). Wherever Green Is Worn: The Story of the Irish Diaspora. Palgrave Macmillan.
- Gannon, Seán William (April 2020). "Henry Hugh Tudor – His Life and Times". The Irish Story.
- Jeffery, Keith (2006). Field Marshal Sir Henry Wilson: A Political Soldier. Oxford University Press. ISBN 978-0-19-820358-2.
- Leeson, David (2003). The Black and Tans: British Police in the First Irish War, 1920–21 (PDF; download). PhD. McMaster University.
- "Periscope" [pseud. G. C. Duggan] (August 1922). "The Last Days of Dublin Castle". Blackwood's Magazine 212, no. 1282.
- Riggs, Bert (25 September 2001). "Longtime Resident Fled from IRA; Distinguished British Officer Served in First World War and Ireland Before Coming to Newfoundland". St. John's Telegram. p. A11.
- Improving the Law Enforcement-Intelligence Community Relationship. Washington, DC: National Defense Intelligence College. June 2007.
- "A Woman of No Importance" [pseud. Mrs. C. Stuart Menzies: Amy Charlotte Bavicke Menzies] (1924). As Others See Us. London: Herbert Jenkins. OCLC 492556455.

Military offices
Preceded by Cyril Blacklock	General Officer Commanding the 9th (Scottish) Division; 1918–1919	Post disbanded
New title Command established	Air Officer Commanding Palestine Command; 1922–1924	Succeeded by Eugene Gerrard
