= Eugene Gerrard =

Eugene Louis Gerrard
- Born: 14 July 1881
- Died: 7 February 1963 (aged 81)
- Military career
- Allegiance: United Kingdom
- Branch: Royal Marines (1900–18); Royal Air Force (1918–29)
- Service years: 1900–29
- Rank: Air Commodore
- Commands: No. 1 Air Defence Group (1927–29); Palestine Command (1924–27); No. 1 Group (1922–24); Mediterranean Group (1920–21); South-West Group RNAS (1917–18); RNAS Eastbourne (1916–17); No. 2 Squadron RNAS (1914–15); No. 1 Squadron RNAS (1914)
- Conflicts: First World War
- Awards: Companion of the Order of St Michael and St George; Distinguished Service Order; Commander of the Order of Leopold (Belgium)

Air Commodore Eugene Louis Gerrard, CMG, DSO (14 July 1881 – 7 February 1963) was a British officer in the Royal Marines and Royal Air Force.

Gerrard was commissioned into the Royal Marine Light Infantry in 1900 and served on HMS Hermione, HMS Defiance, HMS Spartiate, HMS Dido, HMS Prince of Wales (1902) and HMS Vindictive.

In 1911, Gerrard was one of the first four officers chosen by the Admiralty for flying training conducted under the auspices of the Royal Aero Club – he was awarded certificate #76. Gerrard then served as a squadron commander in the newly formed Royal Flying Corps and was posted as a flight commander to the Central Flying School. Whilst at the Central Flying School, Gerrard set two records for flying at high altitude with passengers. On the first occasion, he flew to 10,000 feet with Major Hugh Trenchard. Later, Gerrard flew to 8,400 feet with two passengers.

Following the outbreak of the First World War, Gerrard took up command of No. 1 Squadron of the Royal Naval Air Service. One of his first acts was to attack the Düsseldorf Airship Sheds in a B.E.2a. Later in the war, Gerrard was appointed as the commander of an RNAS wing in the eastern Mediterranean where he gained the Distinguished Service Order for his leadership.

After the war he transferred to the newly formed Royal Air Force.

Military offices
Preceded by Oliver Swann	Officer Commanding Mediterranean Group; 1920–1921	Succeeded by Charles Rumney Samson
Preceded by Hugh Dowding	Officer Commanding No. 1 Group; 1922–1924	Succeeded by Robert Gordon
Preceded by Sir Henry Tudor	Air Officer Commanding Palestine Command; Command renamed HQ Transjordan and Palestine in 1926; 1924–1927	Unknown
Vacant No. 1 Group recreated from the Air Defence Group previously commanded by John Hearson Title last held by Philip Herbert in 1926	Air Officer Commanding No. 1 Air Defence Group; 1927–1929	Succeeded by William Foster
