= List of recipients of the Air Force Medal =

This is a list of recipients of the Air Force Medal of Australia.

== Royal Air Force ==
- Flight Lt. Albert (Bert) Welvaert 1917–2014
- Sergt.-Pilot Clifford Hare 45733 1919
- Flt. Sgt. Alister Bruce Fraser 1674909 1953
- Flt. Lt. Dominic Bruce 1915-2000 (only man to be awarded the AFM and the Military Cross)

=== Queens Birthday Honours 26 May 1953 ===
Flight sergeants:

- 1590837 Benjamin Roy BRADLEY, Royal Air Force
- 575765 James DOUGAN, Royal Air Force.
- 517971- Alfred John FAIRBAIRN, Royal Air Force.
- 794418 Kazimierz GORNY, Royal Air Force.
- 1584832 Terence Maxwell HAMER, Royal Air Force.
- 1331420 (now Master Signaller) William
- Frederick Joseph HFLLS, Royal Air Force.
- 578431 Austen Brian HOWES, Royal Air Force.
- 1215791 Thomas McHuGH, D.F.C., Royal Air Force.
- 1801364 Alexander Henry SHELTON, Royal Air Force.
- 1287688 Henry Frederick John THORPE, Royal Air Force.

Sergeants:

- 4030743 Zivan ATANACKOVIG, Royal Air Force.
- 1583805 Richard Eric BOWLER, Royal Air Force.
- 1436951 Geoffrey Ashwell HALL, Royal Air Force.
- 1816311 William Sidney JONES, Royal Air Force.
- 2236572 John Patrick MCCARTHY, Royal Air Force.
- 1180724 Daniel Victor SUTTON, Royal Air Force.
- 1809968 Richard Thomas VANE, Royal Air Force.

== Royal Australian Air Force ==
| Name | Service Number | Unit | Conflict | Award |
|---|---|---|---|---|
| Bennett, James Mallett | 275 | Australian Flying Corps | First World War, 1914–1918 | Air Force Medal |
| Boddington, Newcombe Adrian | 1974 | Svy Fl | Second World War, 1939–1945 | Air Force Medal |
| Clarke, Robert Douglas | 1831 | Royal Australian Air Force | Second World War, 1939–1945 | Air Force Medal |
| Fahey, Francis Felix | 406352 | Royal Australian Air Force | Second World War, 1939–1945 | Air Force Medal |
| Gersekowski, Andrew Reginald | 906402 | Royal Air Force | Second World War, 1939–1945 | Air Force Medal |
| Greenhill, Albert Leonard | 2153 | Royal Australian Air Force | Second World War, 1939–1945 | Air Force Medal |
| Griffiths, Thomas Sidney | 436431 | Royal Australian Air Force | Second World War, 1939–1945 | Air Force Medal |
| Harrington, William Rex | A32932 | Royal Australian Air Force | Unlinked Conflict | Air Force Medal |
| Hosking, Derrick William | 5308 | Royal Australian Air Force | Second World War, 1939–1945 | Air Force Medal |
| Inglis, Peter Raymond | A318391 | Royal Australian Air Force | Unlinked Conflict | Air Force Medal |
| Jenkins, George Percival | 408111 | Royal Australian Air Force | Second World War, 1939–1945 | Air Force Medal |
| Jones, Gary Lincoln | A56916 | Royal Australian Air Force | Unlinked Conflict | Air Force Medal |
| Kimber, William Robert | A5115 | Royal Australian Air Force | Unlinked Conflict | Air Force Medal |
| Lavers, Justyn Ronald | 2083 | Royal Australian Air Force | Second World War, 1939–1945 | Air Force Medal |
| Lewis, John Alexander | A34969 | Royal Australian Air Force | Unlinked Conflict | Air Force Medal |
| Lyall, James Smith | 16638 | No. 1 Aircraft Depot | Second World War, 1939–1945 | Air Force Medal |
| Mason, John Frederick | 300326 | Royal Australian Air Force | Second World War, 1939–1945 | Air Force Medal |
| McCarthy, John Keith | 2039 | Royal Australian Air Force | Second World War, 1939–1945 | Air Force Medal |
| Padgett, Norman Gunn | 408148 | 9 Comm Unit | Second World War, 1939–1945 | Air Force Medal |
| Roman, David Alexander | A48089 | Royal Australian Air Force | Unlinked Conflict | Air Force Medal |
| Russell, David Keith | A225955 | Royal Australian Air Force | Unlinked Conflict | Air Force Medal |
| Saunders, Richard William | 1990 | Royal Australian Air Force | Second World War, 1939–1945 | Air Force Medal |
| Seton, Michael John | A23953 | Royal Australian Air Force | Period 1950–1959 | Air Force Medal |
| Shiers, Walter Henry | 8974 | Australian Flying Corps | First World War, 1914–1918 | Air Force Medal |
| Thornton, Geoffrey | A33201 | Royal Australian Air Force | Unlinked Conflict | Air Force Medal |
| Trist, Leslie Joseph | 106 | Royal Australian Air Force | Unlinked Conflict | Air Force Medal |
| Tucker, Thomas Wellesley | 30693 | 3 OTU | Second World War, 1939–1945 | Air Force Medal |
| Tuttleby, Clifford Ernest | 2760 | Royal Australian Air Force | Second World War, 1939–1945 | Air Force Medal |
| Watson, Peter Laurie | A57911 | Royal Australian Air Force | Unlinked Conflict | Air Force Medal |
| Wiburd, George | 205759 | No. 2 Squadron | Second World War, 1939–1945 | Air Force Medal |
| Wilson, John Jamieson | 402431 | Royal Australian Air Force | Second World War, 1939–1945 | Air Force Medal |
