= Samthann =

Irish folk saint

Saint Samthann
- Born: Ireland
- Residence: Cluain-Bronach in Meath
- Died: c. 738
- Feast: 19 December

Samthann /ˈsævhæn/, modernised spelling Samhthann or Samthana, is an Irish folk saint, purportedly a Christian nun and abbess in Early Christian Ireland. She is one of only four female Irish saints for whom Latin Lives exist. She died on 19 December 739.

== Manuscript tradition ==
The only extant Life of St Samthann survives in three manuscripts, with the most complete form being in an early fourteenth-century manuscript, in Oxford, at the Bodleian Library, MS. Rawlinson B. 485 ff.150-3, as part of the Codex Insulensis. Charles Plummer used all three manuscripts in his edition of the text, and notes that the other two forms of the Life are dependent on the Bodleian one. In addition to Plummer's Latin edition, the Life has also been translated into English by Dorothy Africa. There is only a small degree of variation between the three manuscripts, and no important omissions or additions, supporting the belief that this was a fairly faithful copy of the posited original that had undergone no drastic ecclesiastical editing. The author's Latin is somewhat stilted, and prone to the occasional clichéd metaphorical phrase, but falls short of the overly convoluted style favoured in Late Latin writing. With one exception, the chronology of the Life follows a straightforward pattern beginning with the saint's marriage and ending with her death. The exception is a miracle regarding the saint's staff, occurring at chapter seventeen, which, whilst not specifically stated as such, would logically appear to belong after the saint's death. The only other apparent error is in the final chapter, where Lasrianus, the founder of Devenish in Lough Erne, who died nearly two centuries earlier is represented as still being alive at the time of Samthann's death. Plummer ascribes this error to the writer's ignorance of the name of the then abbot of Devenish (he is unnamed when previously mentioned in §10), believing that he inserted the only abbot he did know, whose Life he may well have had access to. Overall the consistency of style and language in addition to the cohesive chronology all point to a single author or redactor. There is nothing in the Life itself to give a clear indication as to its date of composition and the date of the posited original has been given as anywhere between the late eighth to the late thirteenth century. Associated evidence, however, such as the relatively short period of prominence for the monastery at Clonbroney (the convent, which may have been founded as early as the fifth century, fades from the records after the death of Abbess Caillechdomhnaill in 1163), the use of individual names (in particular Niall, son of Fergal, king of Cenél Éogain, and Uí Néill overlord from 763 to 770 and Flann son of Connla), and the association of the monastery in the mid- to late eighth century with the royal family of Tethba, in Cairpre Gabra, all support the notion that this Life was initially composed within a few generations of the saint's death, and is a well-preserved late eighth to early ninth century Life.

== Biography ==
Sylvester O'Halloran (1728–1807) speculated that Saint Samthana, Abbess of Clonbrone, took her name from the Samnothes, an Irish religious order related to the Druids.

Of the four female early Irish saints with extant Latin Lives (Saints Brigit, Íte, Monenna and Samthann), chronologically Samthann is the latest, with the Annals of Ulster listing her death in 739. This is also the earliest annals mention of her monastery at Clonbroney (Ir. Clúan-bróaig) near modern Ballinalee, County Longford. References to the monastery continue sporadically throughout the mid eighth through to the early ninth centuries, and then very rarely thereafter. Unlike the three sixth century female monastic saints, Samthann was not the founder of her monastery, but rather inherited after the existing abbess and founder Fuinnech had a fiery prophetic vision of Samthann's grandeur. On the strength of this Samthann moved from her initial monastery at Urney in Tyrone where she served as a stewardess, south to Clonbroney, which was located just east of the modern town of Longford. The Tripartite Life of Patrick asserts that Clonbroney was founded by Patrick for two sisters both named Emer, whose brother Guasacht he made bishop of Granard. All three were the children of Milchú, whom Patrick served as slave in Ulster in his youth. While the story is literally implausible, there does seem to be an association between Samthann and Granard since in the Life she travelled there. Samthann also has an Ulster origin and the genealogies tie her family closely to Patrick in the Tripartite Life.

== The Giant Eel ==
According to the Life, on one occasion a lascivious monk visited the saint's monastery and attempted to seduce one of the virgins living there. When he left the monastery and crossed the river to meet the girl a giant eel rose out of the water, bit him on the genitals and wrapped itself around his waist. The eel remained in this position until the monk returned to the monastery and begged for and received forgiveness from St Samthann.

== Other sources ==
Samthann has also been associated with the Céli Dé reform movement both through some of the sections of her Life as well as through both the document known as the Monastery of Tallaght which records her dealing with the chief reformer St. Maelrain and the Martyrology of Tallaght which includes a hymn to her in the marginalia which reflects the teachings of her Life regarding peregrinatio.

== Poet ==
The Annals of Tigernach record the following verses, written about the 737 battle of Uchbad:

Madh con-ríset in da Aedh
bidh mor-saeth a n-ergairi,
madadh codhal dam-sa is saeth
Aed la h-Aedh mac Fergaili.
O cath Uchbadh co n-aine
a mbith truchlum fer Fene,
ni fuil fo grein gil ganmigh
sil nach Laighnigh a n-Eri.
Nái mile do-rochratar
i cath Uchbadh co n-deni
do slogh Galian ger gart-glan,
mor in martgal fer Féine.
