= Air Force Medal =

- Reverse of medal
- Type: Military decoration.
- Awarded for: ...acts of courage or devotion to duty whilst flying, though not in active operations against the enemy.
- Presented by: UK and Commonwealth
- Eligibility: British, Commonwealth, and allied forces non-commissioned officers and men
- Status: Discontinued in 1993.
- Established: 3 June 1918
- Ribbon bar

Order of Wear
- Next (higher): Distinguished Flying Medal
- Next (lower): Constabulary Medal (de jure); Queen's Gallantry Medal (de facto)

The Air Force Medal (AFM) was a military decoration, awarded to personnel of the Royal Air Force and other British Armed Forces, and formerly to personnel of other Commonwealth countries, below commissioned rank, for "an act or acts of valour, courage or devotion to duty whilst flying, though not in active operations against the enemy". The award was discontinued in 1993 when all ranks became eligible for the Air Force Cross (AFC) as part of the reform of the British honours system.

== History ==
The medal was established on 3 June 1918. It was the other ranks' equivalent to the Air Force Cross (AFC), which was awarded to commissioned officers and Warrant Officers, although the latter could also be awarded the AFC. It ranked below the AFC in order of precedence, between the Distinguished Flying Medal and the Queen's Gallantry Medal.

Although the new award was announced in the London Gazette on 3 June 1918, the actual Royal Warrants were not published in the London Gazette until 5 December 1919.

A bar, worn on the ribbon, could be awarded to recognise a second award of the Air Force Medal.

Recipients are entitled to use the post-nominal letters "AFM".

The first two awards appeared in the London Gazette on 3 June 1918, to:

- 11680 Serjeant Samuel James Mitchell (of Handsworth, Birmingham).
- 106100 Serjeant Frederick Charles Tucker (of Birtley, Durham).

Twenty-nine awards appeared in a supplement to the London Gazette of 8 February 1919.

The first awards of a bar to the Air Force Medal were announced on 26 December 1919, to two sergeants in the Australian Flying Corps, for providing support to a pioneering flight from London to Australia:

- 275 Sergeant James Mallett Bennett, A.F.M.
- 8974 Sergeant Walter Henry Shiers, A.F.M.

In 1979 eligibility for a number of British awards, including the AFM, was extended to permit posthumous awards. Until that time, only the Victoria Cross and a mention in dispatches could be awarded posthumously.

In 1993, the AFM was discontinued, as part of the review of the British honours system, which recommended removing distinctions of rank in respect of awards for bravery. Since then, the Air Force Cross, previously only open to Commissioned and Warrant Officers, has been awarded to personnel of all ranks.

The AFM had also been awarded by Commonwealth countries but by the 1990s most, including Canada, Australia and New Zealand, had established their own honours systems and no longer recommended British honours.

== Numbers of awards ==
Between 1918 and 1993 approximately 942 medals and ten second award bar were awarded.

Period.	Medals.	Bars.
1918–1919	102	2
1920–1929	48	3
1930–1937	20	–
1938–1939	38	–
1940–1945	259	–
1946–1952	175	–
1953–1993	300	5
Total	942	10

Awards include several to the Royal Navy and the Army Air Corps. Fifteen honorary awards were made to aircrew from foreign countries, one in 1919 and 14 for service during the Second World War. Civilians were eligible for the AFM from 1919 to 1932, three awards being made.

== Description ==
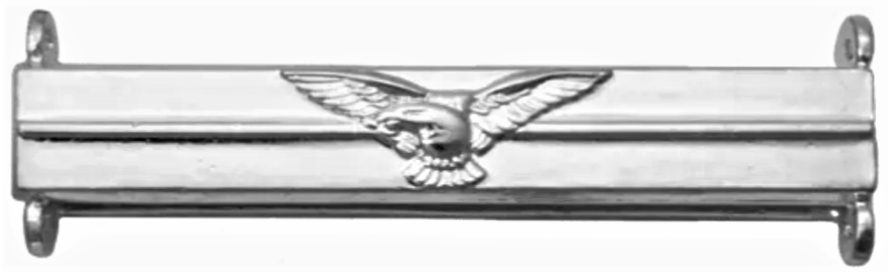
Ribbon bar for a 2nd award

- The AFM is an oval silver medal, 1 3/8 inches (35 millimetres) wide with a height of 1 5/8 inches (41 millimetres), with the following design:
- The obverse shows the effigy and titles of the reigning sovereign:

- King George V bare headed (1918-29)
- King George V in crown and robes (1930–1937)
- King George VI with 'IND: IMP:' (Indian Emperor) in the inscription (1938–1949)
- King George VI without 'IND: IMP:' in the inscription (1949–1953)
- Queen Elizabeth II (1953–1993)
The three most common obverse designs were:

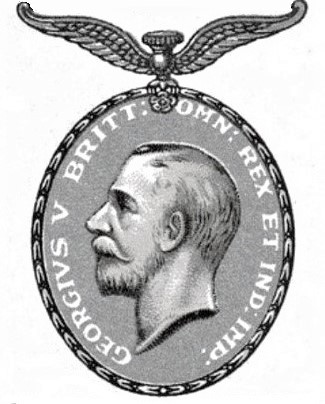
George V 1918-30

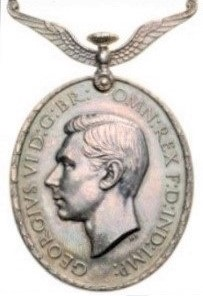
George VI 1938-49

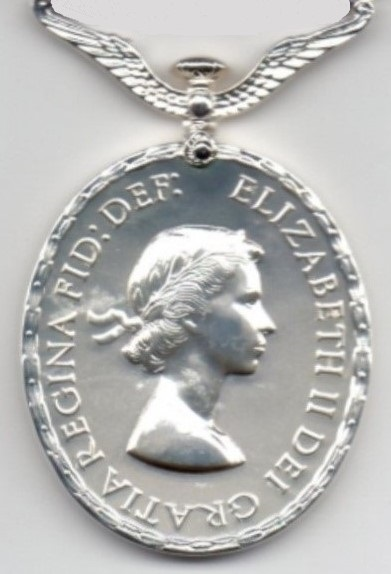
Elizabeth II 1953-93
- The reverse shows Hermes (facing right), mounted on a hawk in flight and bestowing a wreath, all contained within a narrow laurel wreath band. The date "1918" appears behind Hermes on the King George VI and Queen Elizabeth II versions of the medal.
- The suspension consists of two outstretched wings.
- Further awards are signified by a straight slip-on silver bar with an eagle in the centre.
- All awards have the name and service details of the recipient engraved or impressed on the rim.
- The ribbon is 1 1/4 inches (32 millimetres) wide, and consists of alternate red and white stripes, 1/16 inch (2 millimetres) wide, leaning 45 degrees to the left. A red stripe is to appear in the bottom left and upper right corners when viewed on the wearer's chest. Until 1919, the stripes were horizontal.

Air Force Medal ribbon bars
	AFM	AFM and Bar
1918–1919		
1919–1993		

== See also ==
- Recipients of the Air Force Medal
- Category: Recipients of the Air Force Medal
- British and Commonwealth orders and decorations
- The London Gazette of 5 December 1919, containing the Royal Warrants of the DFC, AFC, DFM and AFM

== Bibliography ==
- Abbott and Tamplin (1981). British Gallantry Awards. Nimrod Dix & Co. ISBN 0902633740.
- Duckers, Peter (2001). British Gallantry Awards, 1855–2000. London: Osprey Publishing. ISBN 978-0-7478-0516-8.
- Mussell, John (ed). (2015). Medal Yearbook 2015. Honiton, Devon: Token Publishing. ISBN 978-1-908-828-16-3.
