= North Longford Flying Column =

Irish Republican Army unit

The North Longford Flying Column was a unit of the Irish Republican Army in the Irish War of Independence. Drawing its membership from three North Longford Battalions of the Irish Volunteers, it was led by Seán Mac Eoin.

== Membership and activities ==
Formed by Seán Mac Eoin in 1920, membership of the unit was local to the parishes of Clonbroney, Drumlish, Killoe, Colmcille, Granard, Mullinaghta and Abbeylara. Later, some men from the South Cavan area joined its ranks.

Its most notable engagements included the Battle of Ballinalee (November 1920) and the Clonfin Ambush (February 1921). There were further engagements at Terlicken, Ballybrein, Fyhora and Streete, County Westmeath.
