= Constabulary Medal =

Decoration of the Royal Irish Constabulary

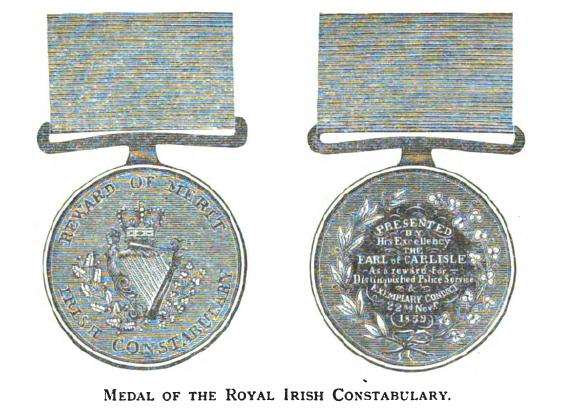
- Black and white rendering of the Constabulary Medal, first version
- Type: Civil decoration
- Awarded for: Before 1872: Gallantry or Meritorious service After 1872: Gallantry
- Country: United Kingdom of Great Britain and Ireland
- Presented by: The Royal Irish Constabulary
- Eligibility: Officers and men of the Royal Irish Constabulary
- Status: None awarded after the 1922 partition of Ireland
- Established: 15 April 1842

Highlights
- Total: 322
- Ribbon bar of the medal

Order of Wear
- Next (higher): Air Force Medal
- Next (lower): Medal for Saving Life at Sea

The Constabulary Medal was a decoration of the Royal Irish Constabulary (RIC). The medal was established on 15 April 1842, by the Inspector General of the Royal Irish Constabulary and approved by the Lord Lieutenant of Ireland. Though it was not formally created by the crown, but was a local award with viceregal approval, it was presented for eighty years and is found in the government's official order of wear.

== Appearance ==
The medal is circular made of silver, and 36 mm (1.4 in) in diameter. The obverse of the medal depicts a crowned harp within a wreath. The first version of the medal has the inscription "REWARD OF MERIT - IRISH CONSTABULARY" while the second version has the inscription "REWARD OF MERIT - ROYAL IRISH CONSTABULARY" This change is in recognition of the addition of "Royal" to the name of the Irish Constabulary in 1867. The reverse bears a wreath half in olive leaves and the other half in shamrocks. The center is plain to allow for the engraving of the name of the recipient.
