= Seán Mac Eoin =

Irish republican and politician (1893–1973)

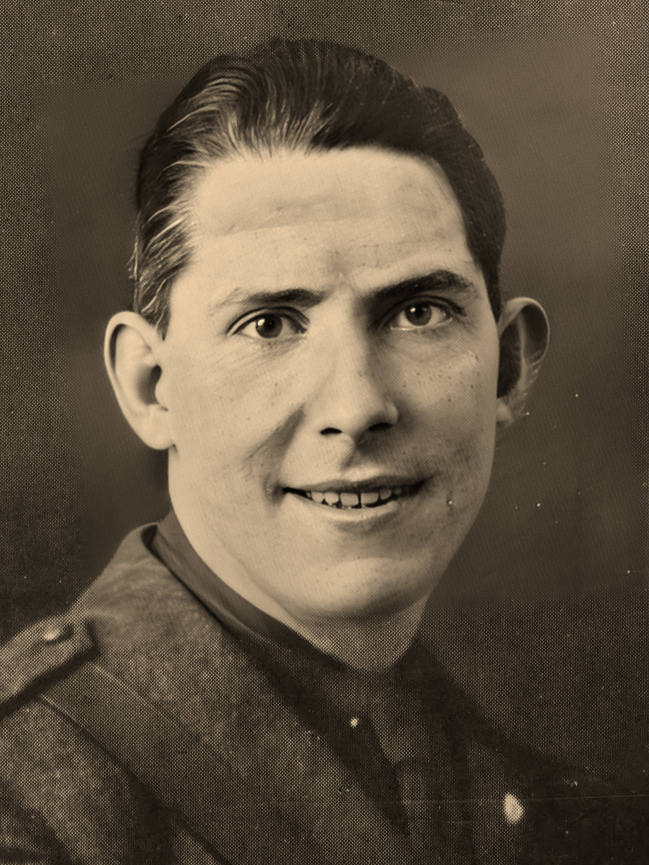
- Mac Eoin, c. 1922

Minister for Defence
- In office 2 June 1954 – 20 March 1957
- Taoiseach: John A. Costello
- Preceded by: Oscar Traynor
- Succeeded by: Kevin Boland
- In office 7 March 1951 – 13 June 1951
- Taoiseach: John A. Costello
- Preceded by: Thomas F. O'Higgins
- Succeeded by: Oscar Traynor

Minister for Justice
- In office 18 February 1948 – 7 March 1951
- Taoiseach: John A. Costello
- Preceded by: Gerald Boland
- Succeeded by: Daniel Morrissey

Chief of Staff of the Defence Forces
- In office 4 February 1929 – 21 October 1929
- Preceded by: Daniel Hogan
- Succeeded by: Joseph Sweeney

Teachta Dála
- In office July 1948 – April 1965
- In office February 1932 – July 1937
- In office May 1921 – August 1923
- Constituency: Longford–Westmeath
- In office July 1937 – July 1948
- Constituency: Athlone–Longford
- In office June 1929 – February 1932
- Constituency: Leitrim–Sligo

Personal details
- Born: John Joseph McKeon; 30 September 1893 Ballinalee, County Longford, Ireland
- Died: 7 July 1973 (aged 79) Dublin, Ireland
- Party: Sinn Féin; Cumann na nGaedheal; Fine Gael
- Spouse: Alice Cooney (m. 1922)
- Relatives: Patrick Cooney (nephew-in-law)

Military service
- Allegiance: Irish Republican Brotherhood; Irish Volunteers; Irish Republican Army; National Army
- Battles/wars: Irish War of Independence; Irish Civil War

Seán Mac Eoin (30 September 1893 – 7 July 1973) was an Irish republican and later Fine Gael politician who was Minister for Defence briefly in 1951 and from 1954 to 1957, and Minister for Justice from 1948 to 1951. He had been Chief of Staff of the Defence Forces from February 1929 to October 1929. He served as a Teachta Dála (TD) from 1921 to 1923 and from 1929 to 1965.

He was commonly referred to as the "Blacksmith of Ballinalee".

== Early life ==
He was born John Joseph McKeon on 30 September 1893 at Bunlahy, Granard, County Longford, the eldest son of Andrew McKeon and Katherine Treacy. After a national school education, he trained as a blacksmith at his father's forge and, on his father's death in February 1913, he took over the running of the forge and the maintenance of the McKeon family. He moved to Kilinshley in the Ballinalee district of County Longford to set up a new forge.

He had joined the United Irish League in 1908. Mac Eoin's Irish nationalist activities began in earnest in 1913, when he joined the Clonbroney Company of the Irish Volunteers. Late that year he was sworn into the Irish Republican Brotherhood and joined the Granard circle of the organization.

MacEoin was a member of the Knights of Saint Columbanus.

== IRA leader ==
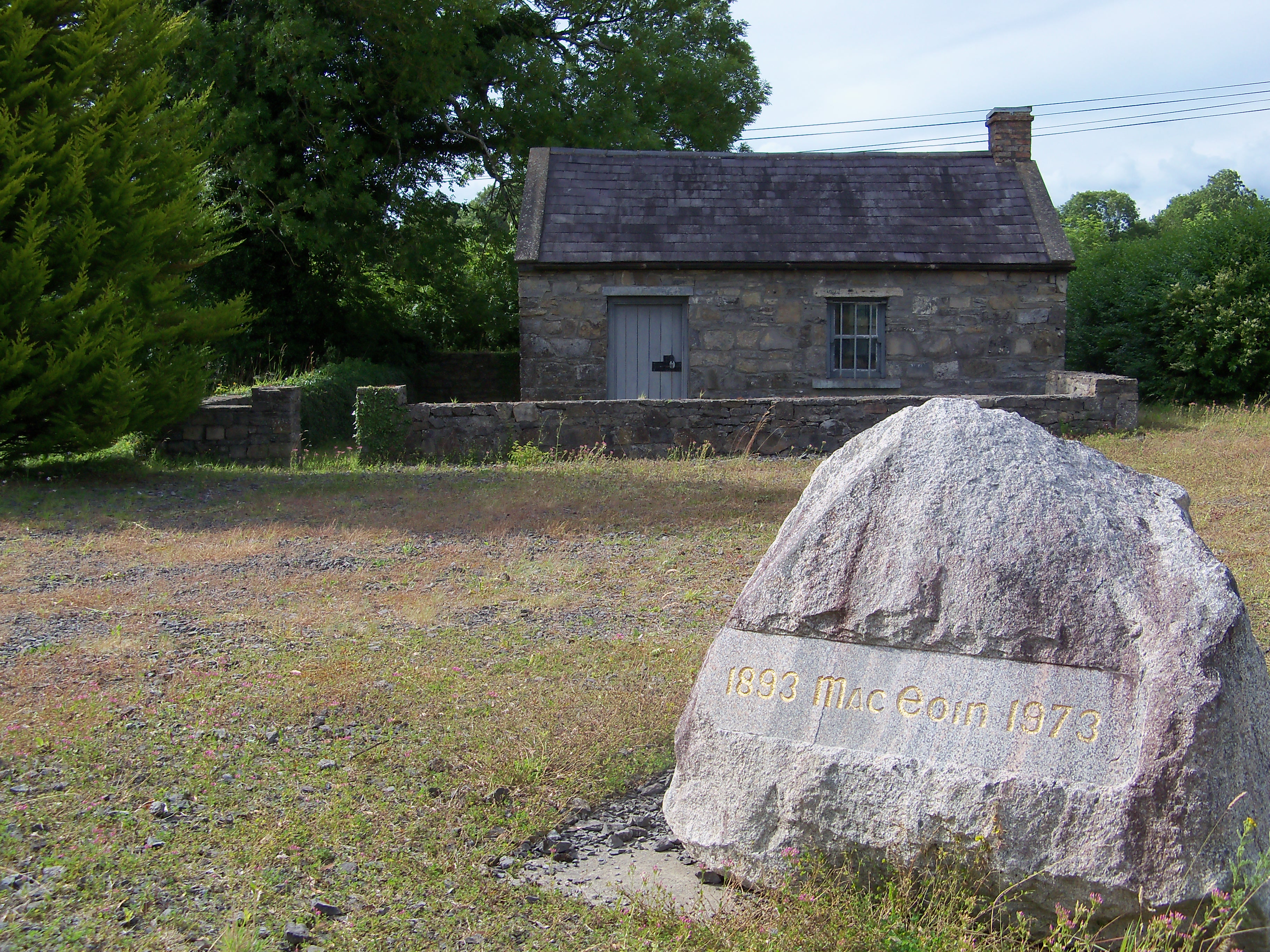
Seán Mac Eoin's work site in Ballinalee, Ireland

Mac Eoin came to prominence in the Irish War of Independence as leader of a flying column of the Irish Republican Army (IRA). In November 1920, he led the Longford Brigade in an attack against British forces in Granard when they were carrying out a reprisal attack, forcing them to retreat to their barracks. On 31 October, Royal Irish Constabulary (RIC) district-inspector Philip Kelleher was shot dead in Granard, and the Auxiliary Division proceeded to set fire to parts of the town. The next day, Mac Eoin held the village of Ballinalee situated on the Longford Road between Longford and Granard. They defended their position against superior forces, forcing them to retreat and abandon their ammunition. In a separate attack on 8 November, Mac Eoin led his men against the RIC at Ballinalee which killed an eighteen-year-old constable and wounded three others. The small RIC garrison allegedly sang "God Save the King" as they took up positions to return fire.

On the afternoon of 7 January 1921, a joint RIC-British Army patrol consisting of eleven policemen and nine soldiers arrived on the street outside the home of Anne Martin in Kilshruley, where MacEoin was staying. Mac Eoin's own testimony at his trial (which was not contested by any parties present) states that:

"I was at the table writing when I was informed of the advance of the party. My account books were left in this house for safety. I was in partial uniform, wearing Sam Browne belt and revolver with two Mills No. 4 bombs in my pocket. Owing to some females being in the house, I had to get out as I could not endanger them by putting up a defence in the house, and as this Officer and Police Force had already signified to my sister and mother their intention to shoot me on sight, I decided to give them a run for their money. I stepped out on the street, about three paces directly in front of the oncoming force, and opened fire with my revolver. The leading file fell, and then the second file in the gateway brought their rifles to the ready. I then threw a bomb, and jumped back behind the porch to let it burst. When it had burst and the smoke had lifted, I saw that the whole force had cleared away, save the officer who was dead or dying on the street."

The RIC officer Mac Eoin killed was district-inspector Thomas McGrath; he also wounded a police constable as well.

British Army intelligence file for John J McKeon

On 2 February 1921, the Longford Brigade ambushed an Auxiliary Division detachment at Clonfin using a mine. Two lorries were involved, the first blown up, the second strafed by rapid rifle fire. District-inspector Worthington Craven was hit by two bullets and killed. District Inspector Taylor was shot in the chest and stomach. Four auxiliaries and a driver were killed and eight wounded. The IRA volunteers captured 18 rifles, 20 revolvers and a Lewis gun. At the Clonfin Ambush, Mac Eoin ordered his men to care for wounded prisoners of war at the expense of captured weaponry. This earned him both praise and criticism, but became a big propaganda boost for the IRA's efforts, especially in the United States. He was admired by many within the IRA for leading practically the only effective column in the midlands. In July 1920, he was among the majority of commanders who were prepared to sign the Agreement recognizing the Volunteers as the Army of the Republic. The Oath of Allegiance was "for the purpose of ratifying under the Agreement under which the Volunteers came under the control of the Dail".

Mac Eoin was captured at Mullingar railway station in March 1921, imprisoned and sentenced to death for the murder of McGrath. His family home was near Currygrane, County Longford, which was also the family home of Sir Henry Wilson, the British CIGS. In June 1921, Wilson was petitioned for clemency by Mac Eoin's mother (who referred to her son as "John" in her letter), by his own brother Jemmy and by the local Church of Ireland vicar, and passed on the appeals out of respect for the latter two individuals. Three members of the Auxiliary Division had already given character references on his behalf after he had treated them chivalrously at the Clonfin ambush in February 1921. However, Nevil Macready, the Commander-in-Chief, Ireland, confirmed the death sentence; he described Mac Eoin as "nothing more than a murderer" who was probably responsible for other "atrocities", but also later recorded in his memoirs that Mac Eoin was the only IRA man he had met, apart from Michael Collins, to have a sense of humour. His second-in-command was from North Roscommon. Sean Connolly had a colourful career as head of Leitrim brigade.

Mac Eoin wrote the following letter to his friend (and classmate at Moyne Latin School) Father Jim Sheridan, a combatant in the Old IRA and a 'flying column' member, who had been ordained and sent to Milwaukee to study theology:

Dear Jim, Last week I was tried, convicted and sentenced to die three weeks from today. My poor mother was here yesterday to request that my body be turned over to her for Christian burial. They refused and told her that my body would be buried in quicklime in the prison yard. If you write immediately, I will receive your letter before I died. Farewell, Jim. Pray for my soul.

According to Oliver St. John Gogarty, Charles Bewley wrote Mac Eoin's death-sentence speech. Michael Collins organised a rescue attempt. Six IRA members, led by Paddy Daly and Emmet Dalton, captured an armoured car and, wearing British Army uniforms, gained access to Mountjoy Prison. However, Mac Eoin was not in the part of the jail they believed, and after a gunfight broke out, the party retreated.

Within days, Mac Eoin was elected to Dáil Éireann at the 1921 general election, as a TD for Longford–Westmeath.

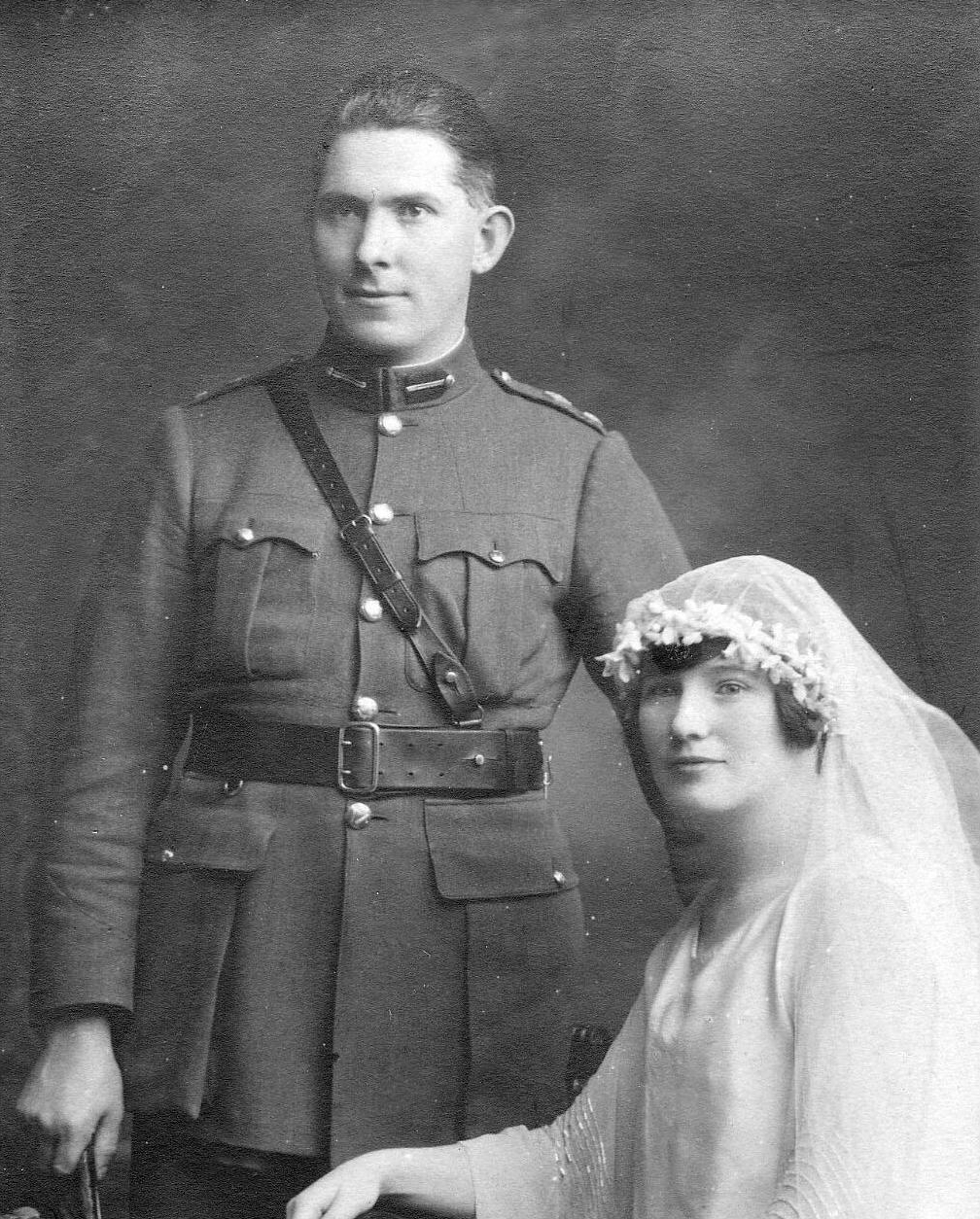
Seán Mac Eoin and Alice Cooney on their wedding day, 21 June 1922.

He was eventually released from prison — along with all other members of the Dáil, after Collins threatened to break off treaty negotiations with the British government unless he were freed. It was rumoured that Sean Mac Eoin was to be the best man at Collins' wedding.

== Treaty and the Civil War ==
In the debate on the Anglo-Irish Treaty, Mac Eoin seconded Arthur Griffith's motion that it should be accepted.

Mac Eoin joined the National Army and was appointed GOC Western Command in June 1922. During the Civil War he pacified the west of Ireland for the new Free State, marching overland to Castlebar and linking up with a seaborne expedition that landed at Westport, County Mayo. He was one of a number of Free State generals whom IRA deputy commander Ernie O'Malley ordered to be shot on sight for ill-treating prisoners.

Mac Eoin was later appointed to head the Curragh training camp in August 1925, quartermaster general in March 1927 and chief of staff in February 1929.

== Political career ==
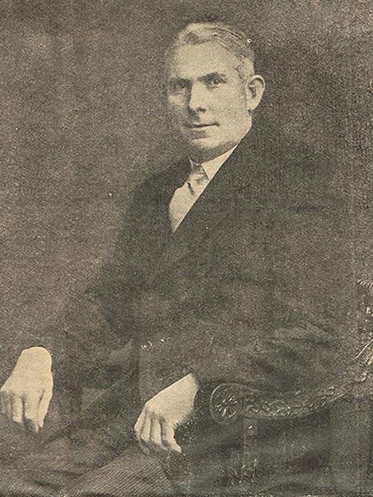
Mac Eoin in 1945

He resigned from the Army in 1929 and was elected at a by-election to Dáil Éireann for the Leitrim–Sligo constituency, representing Cumann na nGaedheal. At the 1932 general election, he returned to the constituency of Longford–Westmeath, and—with the merging of Cumann na nGaedheal into Fine Gael—continued to serve the Longford area as TD in either Longford–Westmeath (1932–1937, 1948–1965) or Athlone–Longford (1937–1948) until he was defeated at the 1965 general election.

During a long political career he served as Minister for Justice (February 1948 – March 1951) and Minister for Defence (March–June 1951) in the First Inter-Party Government, and again as Minister for Defence (June 1954 – March 1957) in the Second Inter-Party Government.

He unsuccessfully stood twice as candidate for the office of President of Ireland, against Seán T. O'Kelly in 1945 and Éamon de Valera in 1959.

Mac Eoin retired from public life after the 1965 general election and died on 7 July 1973. He married Alice Cooney on 21 June 1922, at a ceremony attended by Griffith and Collins; she died on 16 February 1985. They had no children.

== Legacy ==
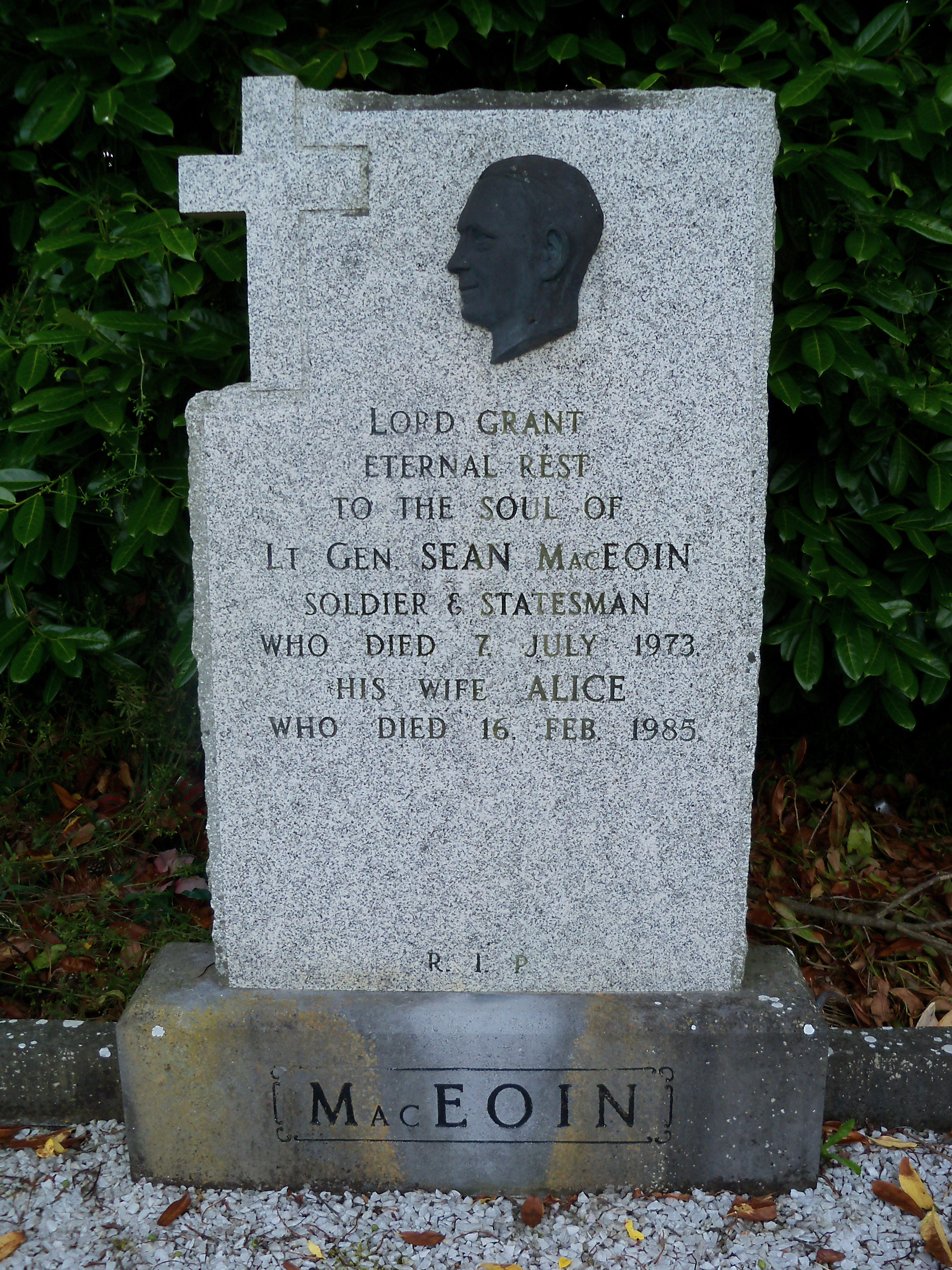
Seán Mac Eoin's burial site in Ballinalee, Ireland

On 16 June 2013, during the General Sean MacEoin Commemoration Weekend, a statue of Mac Eoin was unveiled in his home town of Ballinalee; on the same day a plaque was unveiled in Bunlahy, his birthplace. Both the statue and the plaque were unveiled by Enda Kenny, the Taoiseach, who laid a wreath at the statue.

The forge that he worked in is still standing and is known as 'Mac Eoin forge'.

The attempt at freeing him from jail is referenced in the Jack Higgins novel The Eagle Has Landed.

== See also ==
- Families in the Oireachtas

Political offices
Preceded by Gerald Boland	Minister for Justice; 1948–1951	Succeeded by Daniel Morrissey
Preceded by Thomas F. O'Higgins	Minister for Defence; March–June 1951	Succeeded by Oscar Traynor
Preceded by Oscar Traynor	Minister for Defence; 1954–1957	Succeeded by Kevin Boland
Military offices
Preceded by Daniel Hogan	Chief of Staff of the Defence Forces; February–October 1929	Succeeded by Joseph Sweeny

Dáil	Election	Deputy (Party)	Deputy (Party)	Deputy (Party)	Deputy (Party)	Deputy (Party)	Deputy (Party)	Deputy (Party)
4th	1923	Martin McGowan (Rep)	Frank Carty (Rep)	Thomas Carter (CnaG)	Seán Farrell (Rep)	James Dolan (CnaG)	John Hennigan (CnaG)	Alexander McCabe (CnaG)
4th	1925 by-election	Martin McGowan (Rep)	Frank Carty (Rep)	Samuel Holt (Rep)	Seán Farrell (Rep)	James Dolan (CnaG)	John Hennigan (CnaG)	Martin Roddy (CnaG)
5th	1927 (Jun)	John Jinks (NL)	Frank Carty (FF)	Samuel Holt (FF)	Michael Carter (FP)	James Dolan (CnaG)	John Hennigan (CnaG)	Martin Roddy (CnaG)
6th	1927 (Sep)	Bernard Maguire (FF)	Frank Carty (FF)	Samuel Holt (FF)	Patrick Reynolds (CnaG)	James Dolan (CnaG)	John Hennigan (CnaG)	Martin Roddy (CnaG)
6th	1929 by-election	Bernard Maguire (FF)	Frank Carty (FF)	Seán Mac Eoin (CnaG)	Patrick Reynolds (CnaG)	James Dolan (CnaG)	John Hennigan (CnaG)	Martin Roddy (CnaG)
7th	1932	Bernard Maguire (FF)	Frank Carty (FF)	Stephen Flynn (FF)	Mary Reynolds (CnaG)	William Browne (FF)	John Hennigan (CnaG)	Martin Roddy (CnaG)
8th	1933	Bernard Maguire (FF)	Frank Carty (FF)	Stephen Flynn (FF)	Patrick Rogers (NCP)	William Browne (FF)	James Dolan (CnaG)	Martin Roddy (CnaG)
9th	1937	Constituency abolished. See Sligo and Leitrim						

Dáil	Election	Deputy (Party)	Deputy (Party)	Deputy (Party)
9th	1937	Matthew Davis (FF)	James Victory (FF)	Seán Mac Eoin (FG)
10th	1938	Erskine H. Childers (FF)	James Victory (FF)	Seán Mac Eoin (FG)
11th	1943	Erskine H. Childers (FF)	Thomas Carter (FF)	Seán Mac Eoin (FG)
12th	1944	Erskine H. Childers (FF)	Thomas Carter (FF)	Seán Mac Eoin (FG)
13th	1948	Constituency abolished. See Longford–Westmeath		

Dáil	Election	Deputy (Party)	Deputy (Party)	Deputy (Party)	Deputy (Party)	Deputy (Party)
2nd	1921	Lorcan Robbins (SF)	Seán Mac Eoin (SF)	Joseph McGuinness (SF)	Laurence Ginnell (SF)	4 seats 1921–1923
3rd	1922	John Lyons (Lab)	Seán Mac Eoin (PT-SF)	Francis McGuinness (PT-SF)	Laurence Ginnell (AT-SF)	4 seats 1921–1923
4th	1923	John Lyons (Ind.)	Conor Byrne (Rep)	James Killane (Rep)	Patrick Shaw (CnaG)	Patrick McKenna (FP)
5th	1927 (Jun)	Henry Broderick (Lab)	Michael Kennedy (FF)	James Victory (FF)	Patrick Shaw (CnaG)	Hugh Garahan (FP)
6th	1927 (Sep)	Henry Broderick (Lab)	Michael Kennedy (FF)	James Killane (FF)	Patrick Shaw (CnaG)	Michael Connolly (CnaG)
6th	1930 by-election	Henry Broderick (Lab)	Michael Kennedy (FF)	James Geoghegan (FF)	Patrick Shaw (CnaG)	Michael Connolly (CnaG)
7th	1932	Francis Gormley (FF)	Michael Kennedy (FF)	James Geoghegan (FF)	Patrick Shaw (CnaG)	Seán Mac Eoin (CnaG)
8th	1933	James Victory (FF)	Michael Kennedy (FF)	James Geoghegan (FF)	Charles Fagan (NCP)	Seán Mac Eoin (CnaG)
9th	1937	Constituency abolished. See Athlone–Longford and Meath–Westmeath				

Dáil	Election	Deputy (Party)	Deputy (Party)	Deputy (Party)	Deputy (Party)	Deputy (Party)
13th	1948	Erskine H. Childers (FF)	Thomas Carter (FF)	Michael Kennedy (FF)	Seán Mac Eoin (FG)	Charles Fagan (Ind.)
14th	1951	Erskine H. Childers (FF)	Frank Carter (FF)	Michael Kennedy (FF)	Seán Mac Eoin (FG)	Charles Fagan (Ind.)
15th	1954	Erskine H. Childers (FF)	Frank Carter (FF)	Michael Kennedy (FF)	Seán Mac Eoin (FG)	Charles Fagan (FG)
16th	1957	Erskine H. Childers (FF)	Ruairí Ó Brádaigh (SF)	Michael Kennedy (FF)	Seán Mac Eoin (FG)	Charles Fagan (FG)
17th	1961	Frank Carter (FF)	Joe Sheridan (Ind.)	Michael Kennedy (FF)	Seán Mac Eoin (FG)	4 seats 1961–1992
18th	1965	Frank Carter (FF)	Joe Sheridan (Ind.)	Patrick Lenihan (FF)	Gerry L'Estrange (FG)	4 seats 1961–1992
19th	1969	Frank Carter (FF)	Joe Sheridan (Ind.)	Patrick Lenihan (FF)	Gerry L'Estrange (FG)	4 seats 1961–1992
19th	1970 by-election	Frank Carter (FF)	Joe Sheridan (Ind.)	Patrick Cooney (FG)	Gerry L'Estrange (FG)	4 seats 1961–1992
20th	1973	Frank Carter (FF)	Joe Sheridan (Ind.)	Patrick Cooney (FG)	Gerry L'Estrange (FG)	4 seats 1961–1992
21st	1977	Albert Reynolds (FF)	Joe Sheridan (Ind.)	Seán Keegan (FF)	Gerry L'Estrange (FG)	4 seats 1961–1992
22nd	1981	Albert Reynolds (FF)	Patrick Cooney (FG)	Seán Keegan (FF)	Gerry L'Estrange (FG)	4 seats 1961–1992
23rd	1982 (Feb)	Albert Reynolds (FF)	Patrick Cooney (FG)	Seán Keegan (FF)	Gerry L'Estrange (FG)	4 seats 1961–1992
24th	1982 (Nov)	Albert Reynolds (FF)	Patrick Cooney (FG)	Mary O'Rourke (FF)	Gerry L'Estrange (FG)	4 seats 1961–1992
25th	1987	Albert Reynolds (FF)	Patrick Cooney (FG)	Mary O'Rourke (FF)	Henry Abbott (FF)	4 seats 1961–1992
26th	1989	Albert Reynolds (FF)	Louis Belton (FG)	Mary O'Rourke (FF)	Paul McGrath (FG)	4 seats 1961–1992
27th	1992	Constituency abolished. See Longford–Roscommon and Westmeath				

Dáil	Election	Deputy (Party)	Deputy (Party)	Deputy (Party)	Deputy (Party)	Deputy (Party)
30th	2007	Willie Penrose (Lab)	Peter Kelly (FF)	Mary O'Rourke (FF)	James Bannon (FG)	4 seats 2007–2024
31st	2011	Willie Penrose (Lab)	Robert Troy (FF)	Nicky McFadden (FG)	James Bannon (FG)	4 seats 2007–2024
31st	2014 by-election	Willie Penrose (Lab)	Robert Troy (FF)	Gabrielle McFadden (FG)	James Bannon (FG)	4 seats 2007–2024
32nd	2016	Willie Penrose (Lab)	Robert Troy (FF)	Kevin "Boxer" Moran (Ind.)	Peter Burke (FG)	4 seats 2007–2024
33rd	2020	Sorca Clarke (SF)	Robert Troy (FF)	Joe Flaherty (FF)	Peter Burke (FG)	4 seats 2007–2024
34th	2024	Sorca Clarke (SF)	Robert Troy (FF)	Kevin "Boxer" Moran (Ind.)	Peter Burke (FG)	Micheál Carrigy (FG)
