= Edward Allan Wood =

British Army officer

Brigadier-General Edward Allan Wood CMG DSO***
- Born: 6 May 1865; India
- Died: 20 May 1930 (aged 65); London, England
- Burial place: Highgate Cemetery
- Military career
- Allegiance: United Kingdom
- Branch: British Army
- Service years: 1892–1906; 1914–1919
- Rank: Brigadier-General
- Commands: 55th Brigade (1917–1918); 6th Battalion King's Shropshire Light Infantry (1917)
- Conflicts: Jameson Raid; Second Boer War: Siege of Mafeking; First World War; Irish War of Independence
- Awards: Companion of the Order of St Michael and St George; Companion of the Distinguished Service Order & Three Bars; Mentioned in Despatches; Croix de guerre (France)

Brigadier-General Edward Allan Wood, CMG, DSO & Three Bars (6 May 1865 – 20 May 1930) was a British Army officer. He saw service in Rhodesia, the Second Boer War and the First World War, and was briefly Commandant of the Auxiliary Division during the Irish War of Independence.

== Early life ==
Wood was born in India. He was the ninth son of Oswald Wood, a civil servant who later became a judge. Family resources were limited, and Wood joined the British Army as a private soldier in 1892, first enlisting in the 2nd Dragoon Guards and later transferring to the 17th Lancers. He served as an officer in the Bechuanaland Border Police (Botswana Police Service), the Matabeleland Mounted Police and the British South Africa Police, in the 1890s. He joined the Bechuanaland Border Police column in the Jameson Raid in 1895–96 and was captured in the Transvaal Republic. He served with the Matabeleland Relief Force during the rebellion in 1896. He later served in the Second Boer War in 1899–1902 and was present at the relief of Mafeking in 1900. He resigned from British South Africa Police in March 1906.

== First World War ==
On the outbreak of the First World War in 1914, Wood rejoined the British Army and became a company commander in 6th Battalion of the King's Shropshire Light Infantry. He became a temporary lieutenant colonel in 1917, and was appointed a Companion of the Distinguished Service Order (DSO) with Bar while commanding the 6th Battalion, the first announced in the January 1917 New Year Honours, and the second announced on 26 September 1917 (with the citation published on 9 January 1918).

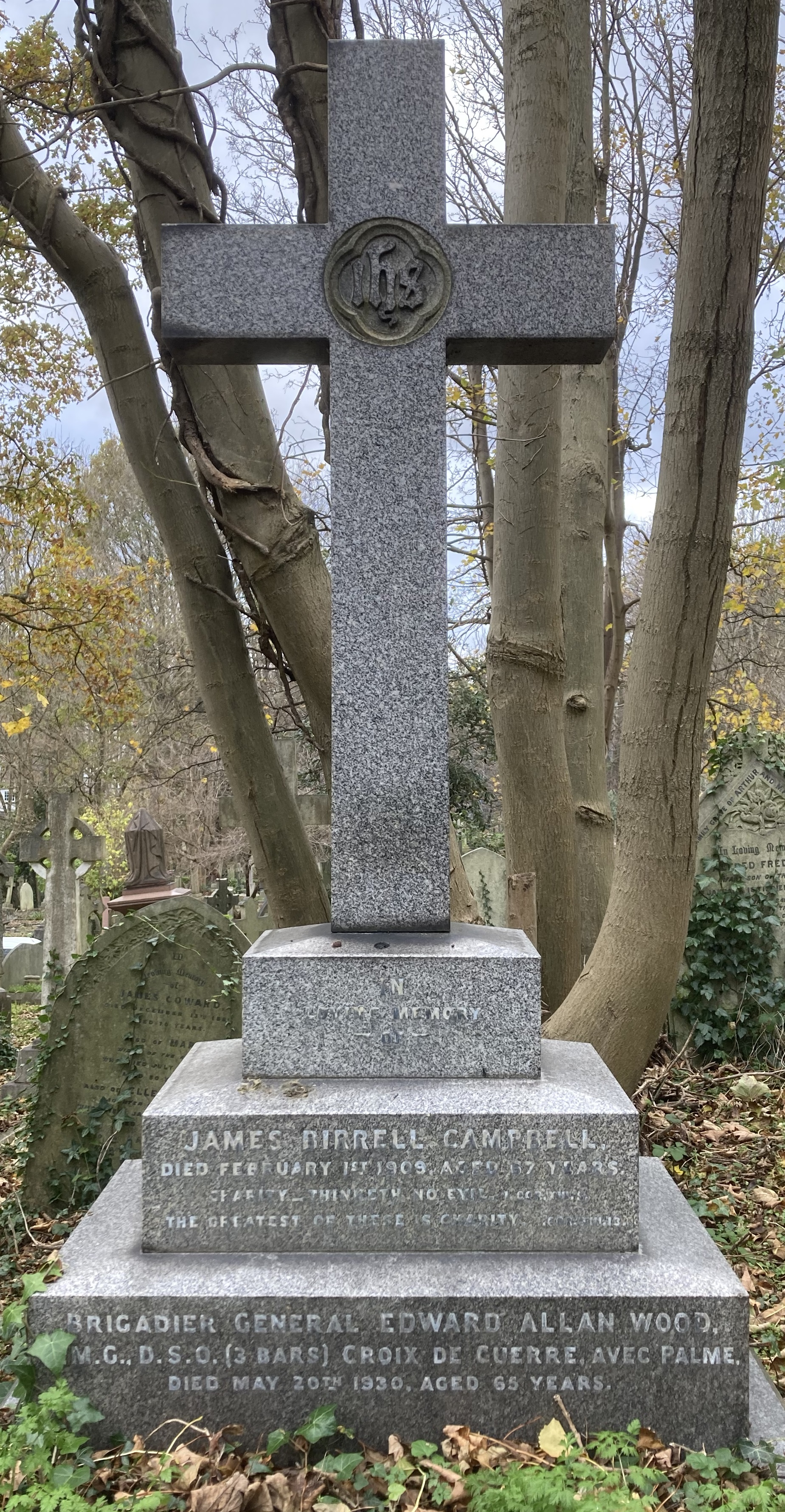
Grave of Brigadier General Edward Wood in Highgate Cemetery

Wood was promoted to brigadier general to command the 55th Infantry Brigade (in the 18th (Eastern) Division) on 9 November 1917, and commanded the brigade until he went sick on 24 October 1918. A second Bar to his DSO was announced on 16 September 1918, and third Bar on 12 December 1919.

He was appointed a Companion of the Order of St Michael and St George (CMG) in the January 1919 New Year's Honours List and also received the French Croix de guerre.

== Later life ==
Wood was demobilised in early 1919, and he joined the Auxiliary Division of the Royal Irish Constabulary in October 1919. He was deputy commander under Frank Percy Crozier, and took command in February 1921 after Crozier resigned. He was bankrupted in 1921.

He had married Myra Cotterell in 1898 and they had a son. He remarried in 1916, to Marguerite Dawson, widow of Joseph Gillott. He died 20 May 1930, from cirrhosis of the liver, and was buried on the eastern side of Highgate Cemetery. He was survived by his second wife and son from his first marriage.
