= Auxiliary Division =

Royal Irish Constabulary paramilitary unit during the Irish War of Independence

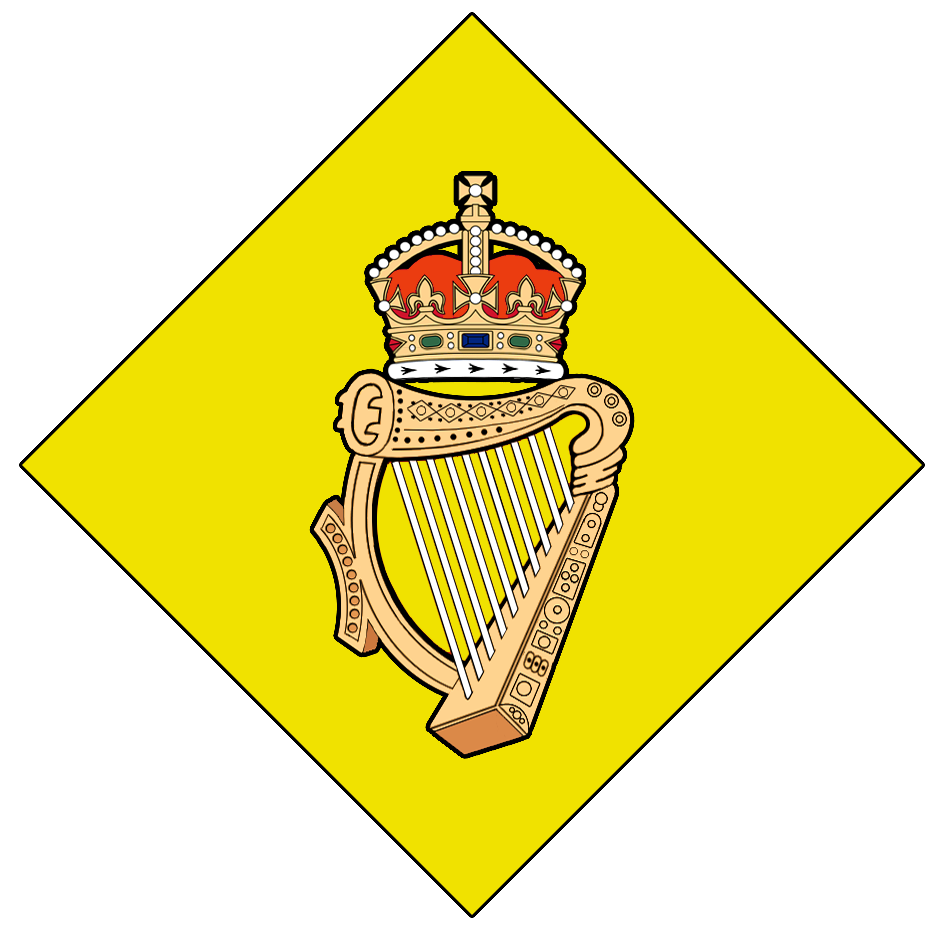
- Badge of the Auxiliary Division (F Company)
- Active: July 1920 – April 1922
- Allegiance: United Kingdom
- Type: Paramilitary
- Role: Counter-insurgency
- Size: 2,264
- Part of: Royal Irish Constabulary
- Engagements: Irish War of Independence; Kilmichael Ambush; Drumcondra ambush; Clonfin Ambush; Coolavokig ambush; Crossbarry Ambush; Burning of the Custom House; Rathcoole ambush

Commanders
- Notable commanders: Frank Percy Crozier

The Auxiliary Division of the Royal Irish Constabulary (ADRIC), generally known as the Auxiliaries or Auxies, was a paramilitary unit of the Royal Irish Constabulary (RIC) during the Irish War of Independence. It was founded in July 1920 by Major-General Henry Hugh Tudor and made up of former British Army officers, most of whom came from Great Britain and had fought in the First World War. Almost 2,300 served in the unit during the conflict. Its role was to conduct counter-insurgency operations against the Irish Republican Army (IRA), acting mainly as a mobile striking and raiding force. It operated semi-independently of the RIC and was mainly deployed to southern and western regions where fighting was heaviest.

The Auxiliaries became infamous for reprisal attacks on civilians and civilian property in revenge for IRA actions, including extrajudicial killings and arson; most notably the burning of Cork city in December 1920.

The Auxiliaries were distinct from the so-called Black and Tans. These were also former British soldiers who were recruited into the RIC, but served as regular constables. Both groups wore a mixed uniform of British Army khaki and RIC dark green, although the Auxiliaries had their own insignia and typically wore Balmoral caps. The Auxiliaries and the RIC as a whole were disbanded in early 1922, following the Anglo-Irish Treaty.

== Recruitment and organisation ==
In September 1919, the Commander-in-Chief, Ireland, Sir Frederick Shaw suggested that the police force in Ireland be expanded via the recruitment of a special force of volunteer British ex-servicemen. During a Cabinet meeting on 11 May 1920, the Secretary of State for War, Winston Churchill, suggested the formation of a "Special Emergency Gendarmerie, which would become a branch of the Royal Irish Constabulary". Churchill's proposal was referred to a committee chaired by General Sir Nevil Macready, Commander-in-Chief of the British forces in Ireland. Macready's committee rejected Churchill's proposal, but it was revived two months later, in July, by the Police Adviser to the Dublin Castle administration in Ireland, Major-General H H Tudor. In a memo dated 6 July 1920, Tudor justified the scheme on the grounds that it would take too long to reinforce the Royal Irish Constabulary (RIC) with ordinary recruits. Tudor's new "Auxiliary Force" would be strictly temporary: its members would enlist for a year: their pay would be £7 per week (twice what a constable was paid), plus a sergeant's allowances, and would be known as "Temporary Cadets". At that time, one of high unemployment, a London advertisement for ex-officers to manage coffee stalls at two pounds ten shillings a week received five thousand applicants.

The ADRIC was recruited in Great Britain from among ex-officers who had served in World War I, especially those who had served in the British Army (including the Royal Flying Corps). Most recruits were from Britain, although some were from Ireland, and others came from other parts of the British Empire. Many had been highly decorated in the war and three, James Leach, James Johnson, and George Onions, had been awarded the Victoria Cross. Their decorations make it clear that many had been promoted from the ranks: some men, for example, had been awarded the common soldier's Military Medal instead of (or in addition to) the officer's Military Cross. Enlisted men who had been commissioned as officers during the war often found it difficult to adjust to their loss of status and pay in civilian life, and some historians have concluded that the Auxiliary Division recruited large numbers of these "temporary gentlemen".

Piaras Beaslaí, a former senior member of the IRA who supported the Anglo-Irish Treaty, while paying tribute to the bravery of the Auxiliaries, noted that the force was not composed exclusively of ex-officers but contained "criminal elements", some of whom robbed people (including a number of Unionists) on the streets of Dublin and in their homes.

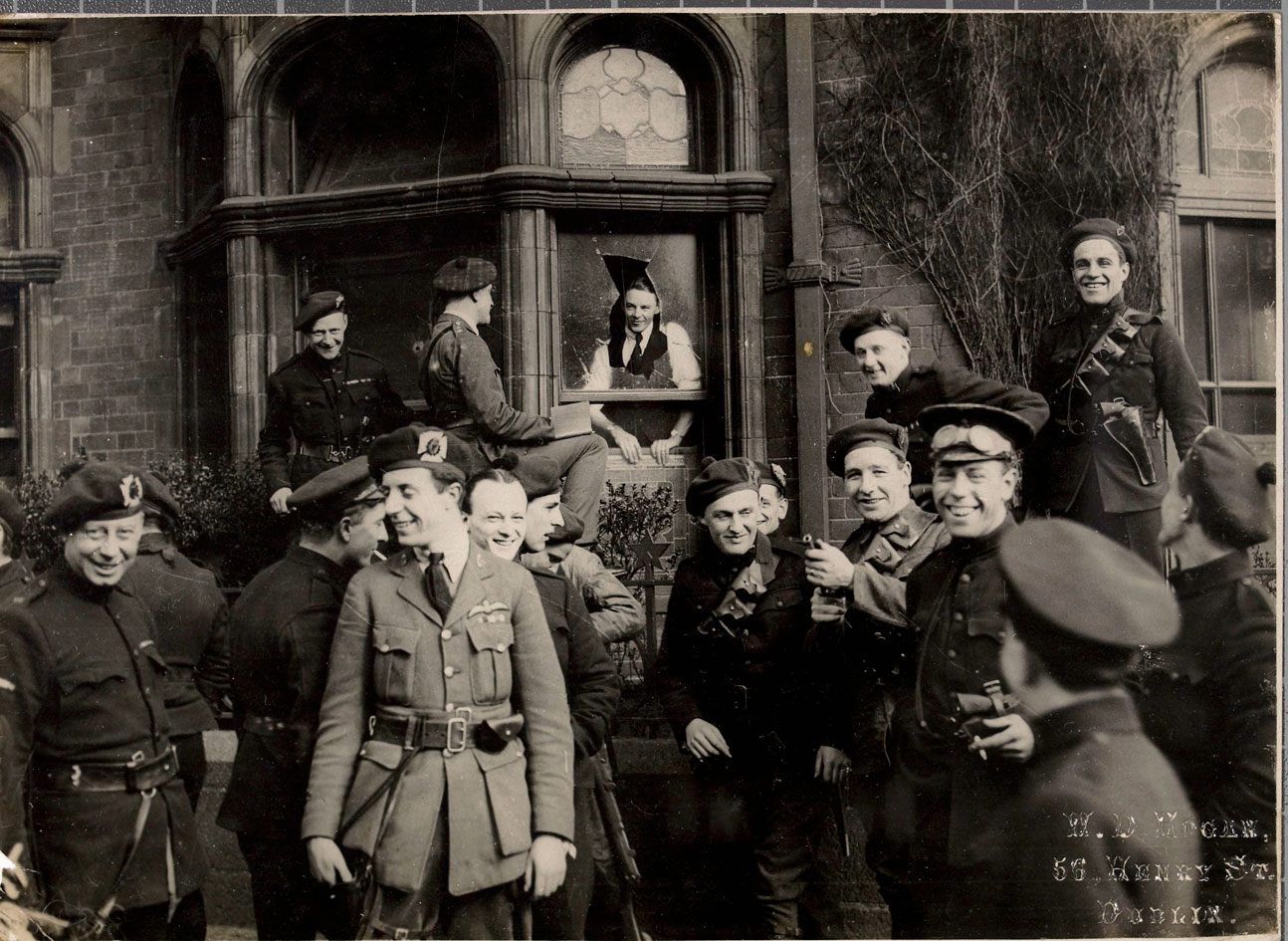
A group of Auxiliaries and "Black and Tans" in Dublin, April 1921

Recruiting began in July 1920, and by November 1921, the division was 1,900 strong. The Auxiliaries were nominally part of the RIC, but actually operated more or less independently in rural areas. Divided into companies (eventually fifteen of them), each about one hundred strong, heavily armed and highly mobile, they operated in ten counties, mostly in the south and west, where Irish Republican Army (IRA) activity was greatest. They wore either RIC uniforms or their old army uniforms with appropriate police badges, along with distinctive Tam o' Shanter caps. They were commanded by Brigadier-General Frank Percy Crozier.

== Counterinsurgency ==
The elite ex-officer division proved to be much more effective than the Black and Tans especially in the key area of gathering intelligence. Auxiliary companies were intended as mobile striking and raiding forces, and they scored some notable successes against the IRA. On 20 November, the night before Bloody Sunday, they captured Dick McKee and Peadar Clancy, the commandant and vice-commandant of the IRA's Dublin Brigade, and murdered them in Dublin Castle. That same night, they caught William Pilkington, commandant of the Sligo IRA, in a separate raid. A month later, in December, they caught Ernie O'Malley completely by surprise in County Kilkenny: the IRA officer was reading in his room when a Temporary Cadet opened the door and walked in; "He was as unexpected as death," said O'Malley. In his memoirs, the commandant of the Clare IRA, Michael Brennan, describes how the Auxiliaries nearly captured him three nights in a row.

IRA commanders became concerned about the morale of their units as to many Volunteers the Auxiliaries seemed to be 'super fighters and all but invincible'. Those victories which were won over the Auxiliaries are among the most celebrated in the Irish War of Independence. On 28 November 1920, for example, a platoon of Auxiliaries was ambushed and wiped out in the Kilmichael Ambush by Tom Barry and the 3rd Cork Brigade. A little more than two months later, on 2 February 1921, another platoon of Auxiliaries was ambushed by Seán MacEoin and the Longford IRA in the Clonfin Ambush. On 19 March 1921, the 3rd Cork Brigade of the IRA defeated a large scale attempt by the British Army & Auxiliary Division to encircle and trap them at Crossbarry. On 15 April 1921, Captain Roy Mackinnon, commanding officer of H Company ADRIC, was assassinated by the Kerry IRA.

Successes required reliable intelligence and raids often brought no result—or sometimes worse. In one case, they arrested a Castle official, Law Adviser W. E. Wylie, by mistake. In another, more notorious case, on 19 April 1921 they raided the Shannon Hotel in Castleconnell, County Limerick on a tip that there were suspicious characters drinking therein. The "suspicious characters" turned out to be three off-duty members of the RIC: both sides mistook the other for insurgents and opened fire; three people, an RIC man, an Auxiliary Cadet and a civilian, were killed in the shootout that followed.

== Controversy ==
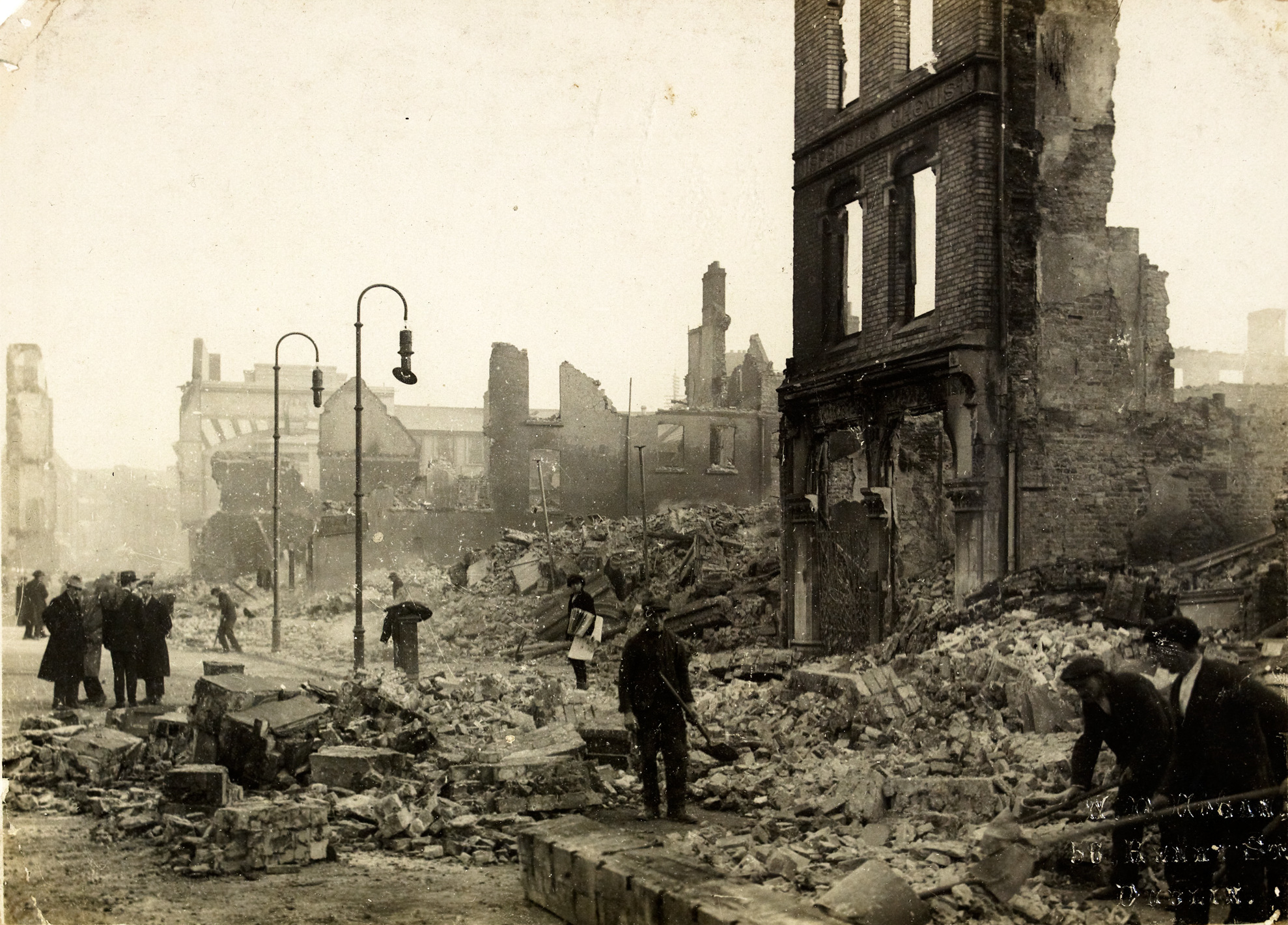
The aftermath of the Burning of Cork by Auxiliaries, December 1920

Many of the Division's Temporary Cadets did not cope well with the frustrations of counterinsurgency: hurriedly recruited, poorly trained, and with an ill-defined role, they soon gained a reputation for drunkenness, lack of discipline, and brutality worse than that of the Black and Tans. They were disliked by members of the Royal Irish Constabulary, who considered them "rough." They seem to have been unpopular with the British Army as well. One British officer, who served as adjutant for the 2nd Battalion, Cameron Highlanders, wrote in his memoirs that the Auxiliaries "were totally undisciplined by our regimental standards". Macready wrote in his own memoirs that "those companies that had the good fortune to have good commanders, generally ex-Regular officers, who could control their men, performed useful work, but the exploits of certain other companies under weak or inefficient commanders went a long way to discredit the whole force".

Like the ordinary police, the Auxiliaries sometimes took reprisals in the wake of attacks by the IRA. On the evening of Bloody Sunday, for example, Dick McKee and Peadar Clancy were killed by their Auxiliary captors under very suspicious circumstances: the official explanation, that the two insurgents tried to escape, is widely disbelieved. Perhaps the most notorious reprisal involving the Auxiliary Division was the burning of Cork on 11 December 1920. At 7:30 p.m. that evening, a truckload of Auxiliaries from newly formed K Company was ambushed at Dillons Cross: a grenade was thrown onto their truck, wounding ten Auxiliaries and killing one, Temporary Cadet Spencer Chapman. Later that night, police and Auxiliaries took revenge by setting fire to the city's commercial centre, preventing the fire service from attending the blaze, and shooting seven people (see Burning of Cork).

Two IRA men, Cornelius and Jerimiah Delaney, were killed in their beds at home in Dublin Hill (though Con Delaney survived to 18 December). Five civilians were shot on the streets. Damage amounting to $20 million was inflicted. The Cork Fire Brigade did not have the resources to deal with the fires: law and order, it seemed, had completely broken down. The British Government at first claimed the citizens were responsible for the arson, but a military court of inquiry known as the Strickland Report later found that the fires had been started by the Auxiliaries. Its findings were suppressed by the government, but K Company was disbanded. Allegedly, some Auxiliaries took to wearing pieces of burnt cork on their caps afterwards, to celebrate the occasion.

A few days later, near Dunmanway, an Auxiliary called Vernon Hart killed a young man and a seventy-year-old priest, whom the Auxiliary patrol met on the road. A third civilian, a local magistrate, escaped by approaching the other Auxiliaries before fleeing across nearby fields. Hart was arrested and court-martialled. At his trial, it was revealed that he had been a "particular friend" of Chapman and had been drinking heavily since 11 December. Concerned that parallels would be made between this case and the killing of Francis Sheehy-Skeffington, the British Cabinet directed that Hart should be examined by at least two medical experts, a highly unusual intervention. These medical witnesses testified that Hart was insane at the time of the murders and the court-martial concluded that he "was guilty of the offenses with which he was charged, but was insane at the time of their commission". Although Hamar Greenwood announced to the House of Commons that he would be detained at His Majesty's pleasure, Hart was briefly held at Broadmoor Criminal Lunatic Asylum before release the following year.

While Hart spent some time in a Criminal Lunatic Asylum, other Auxiliaries got away with murder. On 9 February 1921, James Murphy and Patrick Kennedy were arrested by Auxiliaries in Dublin. Two hours later, constables of the Dublin Metropolitan Police found the two men lying shot in Drumcondra: Kennedy was dead, and Murphy was dying. Murphy died in the Mater Hospital, Dublin on 11 February, but before the end, he declared that he and Kennedy had been shot by their Auxiliary captors. A military court of inquiry was held, and Captain W. L. King, commanding officer of F Company ADRIC, was arrested for the killings. King was court-martialled on 13–15 February, but acquitted, after Murphy's dying declaration was ruled inadmissible, and two officers from F Company provided perjured alibis for Captain King at the time of the shootings. Just short of two weeks later at the Clonmult Ambush in county Cork, an Auxiliary company were accused of killing seven IRA men after they had surrendered.

However, while the authorities often turned a blind eye to reprisals, they were less tolerant of crimes against "civilians" - loyal and non-political people. A number of Auxiliaries were dismissed and prosecuted for theft, including a one-armed former Temporary Cadet, Major Ewen Cameron Bruce, who was imprisoned for robbing a creamery, after being dismissed from the Division for striking a civilian without cause. On 19 February 1921, Commandant Crozier resigned after a dispute over discipline with the Police Adviser. Crozier had dismissed 21 Temporary Cadets accused of looting a licensed grocery store belonging to Protestants in County Meath. When General Tudor reinstated these men pending an official inquiry, Crozier left the Force. Crozier later described the Auxiliaries as "soldiers in disguise under no army and no R.I.C. code." He was replaced by his assistant, Brigadier-General Edward Allan Wood, who commanded the Division until it was demobilised.

== Disbandment ==
The Auxiliary Division was disbanded along with the RIC in 1922. Although the 1921 Anglo-Irish Treaty required the Irish Free State to assume responsibility for the pensions of RIC members, the Auxiliaries were explicitly excluded from this provision. Following their disbandment, many of its former personnel joined the Palestine Police Force in the Mandatory Palestine.

== Historical legacy ==
The anti-insurgency activities of the Auxiliaries Division have become interchangeable with those conducted by the Black and Tans leading to many atrocities committed by them being attributed to the Black and Tans. Nevertheless, both British units remain equally reviled in Ireland.

The Auxiliaries have featured in historical drama films like Michael Collins, The Last September, and The Wind That Shakes the Barley.

== List of companies ==
Unit	Service	Area of operations	Source
Depot Company	27 July 1920 – January 1922	County Kildare (until September 1920); Dublin	
A Company	27 July 1920 – 18 January 1922	County Kilkenny	
B Company	27 July 1920 – 23 January 1922	County Tipperary (until May 1921); County Cavan	
C Company	27 July 1920 – January 1922	County Cork (until February 1921); Dublin	
D Company	3 August 1920 – January 1922	County Galway	
E Company	16 September 1920 – 18 January 1922	County Sligo (until November 1920); County Roscommon (until June 1921); County Mayo	
F Company	September 1920 – January 1922	Dublin	
G Company	October 1920 – January 1922	County Clare	
H Company	28 October 1920 – 18 January 1922	County Kerry	
I Company	November 1920 – January 1922	Dublin (until March 1921); County Leitrim (until June 1921); County Monaghan	
J Company	November 1920 – 23 January 1922	County Cork	
K Company	22 November 1920 – March 1921	County Cork	
L Company	October 1920 – January 1922	County Cork	
M Company	December 1920 – January 1922	County Longford	
N Company	3 January 1921 – 14 January 1922	County Meath	
O Company	27 January 1921 – 19 January 1922	County Dublin (until February 1921); County Cork	
P Company	March 1921 – January 1922	County Sligo	
Q Company	March 1921 – 14 January 1922	Dublin	
R Company	April–May 1921 – 16 January 1922	Dublin	
S Company	28 May 1921 – ?	Dublin Castle; worked in communications	
Z Company	28 May 1921 – January 1922	Dublin Castle; worked in intelligence gathering	
