= Michael McCarthy (Irish Republican) =

Personal details
- Born: 1895 Dunmanway, County Cork, Ireland
- Died: November 28, 1920 (aged 25) Kilmichael, Ireland
- Resting place: St Bartholomew's Church, Castletown-Kinneigh
- Parents: Daniel McCarthy Sr; Marie McCarthy
- Relatives: Margaret O’Toole and 7 others
- Nickname: Mick McCarthy

Military service
- Allegiance: Irish Republic
- Branch/service: Irish Republican Army
- Rank: Captain
- Unit: 3rd West Cork Brigade
- Commands: Vice Commandant
- Battles/wars: Irish War of Independence; Tooreen ambush; Kilmichael ambush †

Michael McCarthy (1895 - 28 November 1920) was an Irish revolutionary who fought in the Irish Republican Army during the Irish War of Independence. He is best remembered for his participation as acting as Tom Barry's second in command and death during the Kilmichael ambush.

== Early life ==
Michael McCarthy was born in 1895 to parents Daniel and Marie McCarthy. His father Daniel was a cooper by trade. Marie and their children would have to help around the shop. Michael would make a wage of around £3 per week while working in his father’s shop. Due to Daniel’s poor health and raids by the British Constabulary, his business did poorly. He was also an active member in the Irish Republican Movement. According to family lore, Daniel would go on to be jailed between 23 and 28 times due to his Anti-British Activities in a period of 1916 to 1921. He was close friends with many of the Irish Republican leadership including Michael Collins and Tom Barry. Collins and Barry would be seen in the household and drinking at the local pub with Daniel on many occasions. Daniel would eventually be one of the heads the Munster IRA and participated in The Easter Rising in 1916. Growing up Michael was exposed to Ireland’s Pro-Independence National Movement, especially by his father and his colleagues in the Irish Republican Brotherhood and Irish Volunteers.

== Irish War Of Independence ==
He would eventually leave home to join the IRA, particularly under the leadership of General Tom Barry.

For a short time at the beginning of the war he was sent to England to conduct IRA activities by request of Michael Collins. He was eventually captured by British authorities and was held at Wormwood Scrubs Prison in London. On 28 April 1920, a group of around 20 Irish Republicans within the prison organized a hunger strike in order to be released. McCarthy was one of 315 prisoners who joined the hunger strike, where he starved himself for 18 days.

Upon his return to Cork, he reunited with Barry and other members of the Third West Cork Brigade. It is assumed he took part in the Tooreen Ambush since he was serving with Barry at the time, who was leading the ambush, and had knowledge of a lorry's escape during the ambush. He would eventually be promoted up to the rank of Captain and was a vice commandant of The 3rd West Cork Brigade. Upon his evaluation, it was stated that he had no misconduct during his military duties and he had received a medal. During his time back in Cork, while still being "on the run", his father was solely dependent on him financially.

== Preparation For The Kilmichael Ambush ==
The first Auxiliaries from C Company had arrived in Cork on 27 July 1920. C Company would later be joined by L Company in October and J Company and K Company in November 1920. C Company under the command of Lieutenant Colonel Buxton Smith, set up command in Macroom in Macroom Castle. The Auxiliaries would conduct raids, occasionally drunk, against the Irish populus in order to intimidate them away from joining the IRA. Key raids occurred in Dunmanway, Coppeen and Castletown-Kinneigh. According to Barry’s memoir, Guerilla Days in Ireland, it is said that before Kilmichael the IRA hardly fired a shot at the Auxiliaries, which "had a very serious effect on the morale of the whole people as well as on the IRA".

On October 17, 1920, James Lehane, a civilian who did not have any political ties to either side, was killed while visiting Ballymakeera with his wife. The Auxiliaries from C Company intended to burn the town using petrol, but retreated when mistaking their own gunshots for the IRA. His murder, and the lack of punishment for the Auxiliaries angered the people of Cork. In the month leading up to the ambush, Two Auxiliaries were kidnapped and killed by the IRA near Macroom and several Black and Tans were killed in the towns of Glandore and Leap by the 3rd Cork Brigade. This paired with other incidents in Cork City and Waterfall by the 1st South Cork Brigade.

On October 31 of 1920, McCarthy, Barry, and Vice Officer Commanding Stephen O’Neill assembled a flying column to ambush a group of British Auxiliaries in response to British reprisals for the IRA Assassinations of British officials known as Bloody Sunday and the murder of James Lehane. Once the column was formed, Barry was appointed commander of the group.

During this time of preparation, McCarthy and five other members stayed in the house of Shelia O'Neill (also known as Julia Hurley), a member of Cumann na mBan. It was there McCarthy prepared his men for the upcoming ambush and stayed there multiple nights. It is said that O’Neill personally gave McCarthy 100 rounds of ammunition shortly before the ambush.

By November 21, the Flying Column had 36 volunteers and assembled in Clogher Townland, not to be confused with Clogher, Northern Ireland. It was there supplies were distributed and prepared. Each volunteer had an average of 35 rounds for their rifles.

McCarthy, Barry, and Sonny Dave Crowley scouted possible locations for the ambush on horseback. The two selected one on the Macroom–Dunmanway road, on the section between Kilmichael and Gleann, which the Auxiliaries coming out of Macroom used every day.

Afterwards, McCarthy, Barry, and other IRA members assembled in the house of Mary Kate Falvey, another member of Cumann na mBan. Her house was raided by Auxiliaries and arrested two IRA members by the names of Liam Deasy and James Jordan weeks before. There she gave members of the column more supplies. The column left her house the day before the ambush. 6 volunteers were late due to a mistake and had to meet the 30 volunteers at a different location. The 36 volunteers marched to the designated site of the ambush at midnight. At 1:00 AM, the column stopped to receive confession from Father O’Connell who came to meet the volunteers from a church from Enniskeane. They arrived there at around 8:30 AM after a 18 mile march in the rain, where they waited there for the Auxiliaries to arrive in the morning.

The volunteers were divided into five groups, which made up three sections. The first section (14 men including command post) was led by General Barry, who would stop and engage the first Lorry. The second section (10 men) led by McCarthy was put in the back of the operation to flank the Auxiliaries. The third section (5 or 6 men) was positioned in the middle to ensure that British forces don't take up the other side of the road. Additionally a scouting team of 2 men were kept towards the front of the road which also acted as a rear guard. Other members of the column were spread along the road between the two positions.

McCarthy's section was spread out with McCarthy, Jack Hennessy, and John Lordan laying down behind small rocks, that provided limited cover. Above McCarthy, further above the hill, 6 volunteers waited in case there was a third lorry. Finally across the street, McCarthy sent Ned Young to prevent the auxiliaries from escaping off the road to a nearby farm.

The volunteers waited for hours in the cold muddy ditches without food and any additional supplies. Barry, McCarthy, and other members of the leadership contemplated calling the ambush off at this time.

== Kilmichael Ambush ==
It was between 4:05 and 4:20 pm when the Lorries were spotted. Just before the Auxiliaries in two lorries came into view, two armed IRA volunteers, responding late to Barry's mobilization order, drove unwittingly into the ambush position in a horse and side-car, almost shielding the British forces behind them. Barry managed to avert disaster by directing the car up a side road and out of the way, while McCarthy, who was talking to Barry at the time, rushed back to his position.

The two lorries were filled with Auxiliaries from C Company. The Auxiliaries were led by Captain District Inspector Francis William Crake. Crake was a veteran of World War I, just like many of the other Auxiliaries. He fought during the Hundred Days Offensive. He was awarded a medal for leading a charge against a German battery. Crake arrived in Cork in August 1920 and was given command of the Auxiliaries of C Company on October 3 of that year. The other officer in the lorries was Section commander William Thomas Barnes, who was promoted to section commander on the same day as Crake. Both officers were in the first lorry. The driver of the second lorry was Cecil James Guthrie. Guthrie was a young man who had only gotten married months before and was most likely the killer of James Lehane. He was formerly in the RAF and the youngest of all the Auxiliaries present at age 21.

As the lorries came into view, all but Barry hid so they were not to be spotted. Barry was dressed in an Irish Officer’s tunic, given to him by Paddy O'Brien, an Irish volunteer who was also present at the ambush. Barry waited in the center of the road in front of a concealed command post, where three riflemen from his section waited. Barry then motioned for the Auxiliaries to slow down by raising his hand. The Auxiliaries, believing Barry was a British officer (due to the similarity of the uniforms), slowed down right in front of sections one and two. The British claimed that all of the volunteers were dressed in British uniforms but Barry was the only one in any uniform at all, but most of the flying column was equipped with British weapons and volunteer Hennessy wore a "tin hat".

The first lorry, containing nine Auxiliaries, slowed almost to a halt close to the intended ambush position. When the lorry was around 35 yards away from Barry, he blew a whistle to signal the sections to open fire and threw a Mills bomb that exploded in the open cab of the first lorry. Both occupants, driver Arthur Frederick Poole and Crake, were killed instantly. The lorry rolled a few yards forward until it hit a rock. A savage close-quarters fight ensued, between surviving Auxiliaries and a combination of IRA Section One.

At the same time Section Two and Three opened fire on the second lorry. The lorry driver, Guthrie, attempted to reverse but was unable to do so successfully. The Auxiliaries then dismounted and engaged with Section Two. Young, when seeing Guthrie and another auxiliary leave the lorry, left his position and shot Guthrie, critically injuring him, and killing the other auxiliary, hiding underneath the lorry. During the firefight between Section Two and the Auxiliaries from the second lorry, McCarthy raised his head slightly to try to get a better look at the Auxiliaries, and was shot right through the head and was killed. Hennessy then assumed control of Section Two.

Barry then brought the Command Post soldiers of section 1, who had completed the attack on the first lorry to reenforce the other sections. Once arriving, Barry blew his whistle, leading to Hennessy, Lordan, and the rest of section 2 to charge towards the enemy with bayonets or the butts of their rifles in close quarters combat. Young, upon hearing the whistle, regrouped with section 2 and partook in the close combat. Barry reported that surviving auxiliaries called out a surrender and that some dropped their rifles. The Auxiliaries then reportedly opened fire again with revolvers when three IRA men from section 2 emerged from cover, killing one volunteer instantly, Jim O'Sullivan, and mortally wounding Pat Deasy in the abdomen, the younger brother of Liam Deasy. Barry then said he ordered, "Rapid fire and do not stop until I tell you!". Barry stated that he ignored a subsequent attempt by remaining Auxiliaries to surrender, ordering his men to keep firing until he believed all of the Auxiliaries were dead Barry said of the Auxiliaries who tried to surrender a second time, "soldiers who had cheated in war deserved to die." Barry referred to this episode as the auxiliaries' false surrender.

== Aftermath of Kilmichael ==
British forces suffered 16 killed in the initial attack and Frederick Henry Forde, who was seriously injured, who was thought to be dead by the IRA, when inspecting the bodies. The other survivor of the ambush was Guthrie, who was wounded but escaped during the battle. He was then found on the way to Macroom by two local IRA rebels, who were only equipped with a pipe. Using the pipe to mimic a gun, they forced Guthrie to give up his revolver and used it to execute him, in fear of reprisals. Irish casualties were 3 dead: Captain Michael McCarthy, Jim O'Sullivan, and Pat Deasy, the youngest of the column at age 15, who died from his wounds while receiving medical attention in a farm house after the battle. Hennessy, with injuries to his scalp, and Lordan, whose ear was shot, were the only IRA that were wounded.

After the battle, Irish forces hid McCarthy's body in a nearby bog under a large rock for several days. After some time, some of the rebels, including some family members of the deceased and Mary Kate Falvey, were sent to retrieve the body, and he, along with the other Irish casualties, were given proper funerals at St Bartholomew's Church in Castletown-Kinneigh.

After the war, his family received funds from the Irish White Cross. The family received £50, £25, and then £10 in addition to weekly payments of £2 for 20 weeks and £1 for an additional 20 weeks.

== Pension ==
In 1923, his father Daniel, tried to receive a pension after the passing of the Army Pension Act of 1923. He did this because he was not making enough money from his business because of his poor health (notably losing control of his deformed right leg). All but three of his children went to The United States. He had one son who was a court clerk, one daughter who was a typist in Cork City, and one son whose just graduated school. It was stated that only the son who was a court clerk contributed any amount of money to their father. His daughter could barely keep herself afloat and his youngest son just graduated school and was an apprentice to Daniel. His request for an allowance was originally denied but after a meeting of the Army Pensions Board and letters from Sean Collins, (brother of Michael Collins) and T.J. Murphy, he was granted £150 as compensation, which was the maximum gratuity that could be made by the Army Pension Act of 1923. The claim was processed and sent on 10/7/1924.

Letters also noted that Daniel was a candidate in the previous election.

In 1957, his newly widowed sister Margaret O’Toole, represented by lawyer Dryden Terrace, picked up the case for a pension, after the Army Pension Acts of 1953 and 1957. The case was denied after several attempts (1957, 1958, 1959, and 1960) because she was not a clear dependent. A final ruling by the Minister of Defense, Kevin Boland, denied her a pension.
