= Michael McCarthy =

Michael, Mike or Mick McCarthy may refer to:

== Arts and entertainment ==
- Michael McCarthy (choirmaster), British-American choral director
- Michael McCarthy (film director) (1917–1959), director of It's Never Too Late
- Michael McCarthy (singer) (born 1966), Irish musical theatre performer
- Michael McCarthy (1942–1979), British rock musician better known as Mike Patto
- Mike McCarthy (producer) (born 1965), American record producer
- Mike McCarthy (Australian singer-songwriter)

== Politicians ==
- Michael McCarthy (Irish politician) (born 1976), Irish Labour Party politician
- Michael J. McCarthy (politician) (1890–1955), American politician in Massachusetts
- Mike McCarthy (Vermont politician), member of the Vermont House of Representatives
- Michael McCarthy (Irish Republican) (1895–1920), fought in the Irish War of Independence
- Michael McCarthy (New Hampshire politician), American politician in New Hampshire

== Sportsmen ==
- Mick McCarthy (born 1959), English-born Irish football manager and former player
- Mick McCarthy (footballer, born 1911) (1911–1973), Irish football goalkeeper
- Mick McCarthy (Gaelic footballer) (1965–1998), Irish sportsperson
- Mick McCarthy (Na Piarsaigh hurler) (1949–2024), Irish hurler
- Mike McCarthy (born 1963), American football coach
- Mike McCarthy (baseball) (born 1987), American baseball coach
- Mike McCarthy (Gaelic footballer), Irish Gaelic footballer
- Mike McCarthy (gridiron football executive) (born 1953), football executive and scout
- Mike McCarthy (rugby union) (born 1981), English-born Irish rugby union player
- Michael McCarthy (Australian footballer) (born 1957), Hawthorn premiership player
- Michael McCarthy (cyclist) (born 1968), American cyclist
- Michael W. McCarthy (born 1971), American thoroughbred racehorse trainer

== Others ==
- Michael McCarthy (journalist) (born c. 1947), British environmentalist, naturalist, journalist and writer
- Mike McCarthy (journalist), British television journalist
- Michael McCarthy (Irish lawyer) (1864–1928), Irish lawyer and anti-clerical author
- Michael McCarthy (bishop) (born 1950), Roman Catholic bishop in Queensland, Australia
- Michael J. McCarthy (general), U.S. Air Force general
- Michael M. McCarthy (1845–1914), Canadian US Army soldier and Medal of Honor recipient
- Michael A. McCarthy, American diplomat

== See also ==
- MacCarthy dynasty
