= Kilmichael =

Kilmichael may refer to:

- Kilmichael, County Cork, Ireland
  - Kilmichael Ambush, 1920
- Kilmichael, Mississippi, United States
- Kilmichael structure, geological feature and probable impact crater, near Kilmichael, Mississippi
