= Francis Crake =

British Army officer (1893–1920)

- Born: 19 April 1893; Newcastle upon Tyne, Northumberland
- Died: 28 November 1920 (aged 27); Near Kilmichael, County Cork
- Burial place: Elswick, Newcastle upon Tyne
- Spouse: Guinevere Sykes (m. 1914)
- Military career
- Allegiance: United Kingdom
- Branch: British Army (1909–1913, 1914–1920); Royal Irish Constabulary (1920)
- Service years: 1909–1920
- Rank: Captain
- Units: Royal Army Medical Corps; 11th Reserve Regiment of Cavalry; Hampshire Regiment; Bedfordshire Regiment; Hertfordshire Regiment
- Conflicts: World War I; Hundred Days Offensive; Second Battle of Bapaume; Battle of Havrincourt; Battle of Cambrai (1918); Irish War of Independence; Kilmichael Ambush †
- Awards: Military Cross

Captain Francis William Crake MC (19 April 1893 – 28 November 1920) was a British Army and Royal Irish Constabulary officer.

== Early life ==
Francis Crake was born on 19 April 1893 in Newcastle upon Tyne, where he also resided. Crake was originally employed as an Insurance Agent's Clerk before joining the Royal Army Medical Corps in 1909, serving with the 1st Northumbrian Field Ambulance until 1913.

== First World War ==
Following the outbreak of the First World War, Crake enlisted into the 11th Reserve Regiment of Cavalry in September 1914. After leaving the cavalry in June 1915, Crake then entered service with the Hampshire Regiment and served on the Western Front from July 1915 to June 1917. Subsequently, he was selected for officer training and was commissioned into the Bedfordshire Regiment on 27 November 1917. In April 1918, he returned to the front, joining the 6th Battalion of the Bedfordshires, however the following month this unit was broken up and absorbed by 1/1st battalion, the Hertfordshire Regiment. He finished the conflict with the rank of captain.

=== Military Cross ===
He was awarded the Military Cross for his conduct in September 1918 during the Allied Hundred Days Offensive. His citation reads:

"T./2nd Lt. Francis William Crake, 6th Bn., Bedf. R., attd. 1st Bn., Hert. R. For conspicuous gallantry and devotion to duty in an attack. When the other officers became casualties and the company had suffered heavy losses, he reorganised several scattered bodies of men and continued to lead them forward to the objective in a most determined manner. By his courage and example, he assisted materially in the capture of a hostile battery."

== Irish War of Independence ==
In August 1920, he was appointed District Inspector in command of a unit of the Royal Irish Constabulary Auxiliary Division, based at Macroom in County Cork. On 28 November, while leading a motorised patrol, he was killed in the Kilmichael Ambush.

== See also ==
- William Thomas Barnes – another Auxiliary killed in the Kilmichael Ambush
