= Meda Ryan =

Irish historian

Meda Ryan is an Irish historian.

She has written extensively on the Irish revolution of 1916–23. Among her books are The Tom Barry Story (1982)- later updated and revised as Tom Barry, IRA Freedom Fighter in 2003 - The Day Michael Collins was Shot (1998), Michael Collins and the Women in his Life (1998), Liam Lynch the Real Chief (2005) and Michael Collins and the Women who Spied for Ireland (2006).

She was involved in a dispute with historian Peter Hart over questions he raised in his book The IRA and its Enemies over the Kilmichael Ambush in 1920 and the Dunmanway killings in 1922. Ryan in her book Tom Barry, IRA Freedom Fighter disputed Hart's claims that at Kilmichael British Auxiliaries were killed after they had surrendered and that 13 Protestants killed around Dunmanway in April 1922 were targeted for their religion. Ryan argued that the Auxiliaries were killed after a false surrender and that those killed in 1922 were informers to British forces.

== Bibliography ==
- The Tom Barry Story (1982)
- The Day Michael Collins was Shot (1998)
- Michael Collins and the Women in his Life (1998)
- Tom Barry, IRA Freedom Fighter (2003)
- Liam Lynch the Real Chief (2005)
- Michael Collins and the Women who Spied for Ireland (2006)
