= Dunmanway killings =

Series of killings in County Cork, Ireland

- Location: 51°43′15″N 9°6′46″W; Dunmanway/Bandon, County Cork, Ireland
- Date: 26–28 April 1922
- Target: Protestants
- Attack type: Mass shooting
- Deaths: 14 including three who disappeared
- Injuries: 1
- Perpetrator: Irish Republican Army

The Dunmanway killings, also known as the Bandon Valley Killings, the Dunmanway murders or the Dunmanway massacre, refers to the killing (and in some cases, disappearances) of fourteen males in and around Dunmanway, County Cork and Bandon Valley, between 26–28 April 1922. This happened in a period of truce after the end of the Irish War of Independence (in July 1921) and before the outbreak of the Irish Civil War in June 1922. The massacre became a matter for historical controversy and debate following the publication of Peter Hart's book The IRA and its Enemies in 1998. Of the fourteen dead and missing, thirteen were Protestants including one Methodist and one was Roman Catholic, which has led to the killings being described as sectarian. Six were killed as purported British informers and loyalists, while four others were relatives killed in the absence of the target. Three other men were kidnapped and executed in Bandon as revenge for the killing of an IRA officer Michael O'Neill during an armed raid. One man was shot and survived his injuries. Recent evidence confirms that the killings were carried out by unnamed local IRA members.

It is unclear who ordered the attacks or precisely who carried them out. However, in 2014 the Irish Times released a confidential memo from the then-Director of Intelligence Colonel Michael Joe Costello (later managing director of the Irish Sugar Company) in September 1925 in relation to a pension claim by former Irish Republican Army (IRA) volunteer Daniel O'Neill of Enniskeane County Cork, stating: "O'Neill is stated to be a very unscrupulous individual and to have taken part in such operations as lotting [looting] of Post Offices, robbing of Postmen and the murder of several Protestants in West Cork in May 1922. A brother of his was shot dead by two of the latter named, Woods and Hornbrooke [sic], who were subsequently murdered."

Sinn Féin and IRA representatives, from both the pro-Treaty side, which controlled the Provisional Government in Dublin and the anti-Treaty side, which controlled the area the killings took place in, immediately condemned the killings.

The motivation of the killers remains unclear. It is generally agreed that they were provoked by the fatal shooting of IRA man Michael O'Neill by a loyalist whose house was being raided on 26 April. Some historians have claimed there were sectarian motives; others claim that those killed were targeted only because they were suspected of having been informers during the Anglo-Irish War, and argue that the dead were associated with the so-called Murragh Loyalist Action Group, and that their names may have appeared in captured British military intelligence files which listed "helpful citizens" during the Anglo-Irish War (1919–1921).

== Background ==
=== Political context ===
The Irish War of Independence was brought to an end by negotiations in mid-1921. The truce between British Forces and the IRA came into effect on 11 July 1921, after talks between the British and Irish political leaders. Under the terms, British units were withdrawn to barracks and their commanders committed to "no movements for military purposes" and "no [use of] secret agents noting descriptions of movements". For its part, the IRA agreed that "attacks on Crown forces and civilians [were] to cease", and to "no interference with British Government or private property".

The Anglo-Irish Treaty was signed on 6 December 1921, after negotiations between British and Irish leaders. On 7 January the Dáil (Irish Parliament established in January 1919) narrowly accepted the Treaty, by 7 votes. The Dáil was then split into two factions, those who accepted and those who rejected the Treaty. Under the terms of the treaty, a Provisional Government was set up to transfer power from the British regime to the Irish Free State. British troops began to be withdrawn from the Free State in January 1922, though they retained the option to intervene in Irish affairs should the Treaty be rejected and the Irish Republic re-established.

On 26 March 1922, part of the IRA repudiated the authority of the Provisional Government on the basis that it had accepted the Treaty and disestablished the Irish Republic declared in 1919. April saw the first armed clashes between pro and anti-Treaty IRA units, including the anti-Treaty occupation of the Four Courts in Dublin, the killing of a pro-Treaty IRA officer in Athlone and a gun attack on government buildings in Dublin. According to historian Michael Hopkinson, "the transitional [Free State] government lacked the resources and the necessary acceptance to supply effective government". In this situation, some IRA anti-Treaty units continued attacks on the remaining British forces. Between December 1921 and February 1922, there were 80 recorded attacks by IRA elements on the Royal Irish Constabulary (RIC), leaving 12 dead. Between January and June 1922, twenty-three RIC men, eight British soldiers and eighteen civilians were killed in West Cork, part of the area which would become the Irish Free State.

=== In County Cork ===
West Cork, where these killings took place, had been one of the most violent parts of Ireland during the Irish War of Independence. It was the scene of many of the conflict's major actions, such as the Kilmichael and Crossbarry ambushes. It contained a strong Irish Republican Army (IRA) Brigade (the 3rd Cork Brigade) and also a sizeable Protestant population – roughly 16%, some of whom were loyalists and affiliated to a loyalist vigilante group. The local IRA killed fifteen suspected informers from 1919–21, nine Catholics and six Protestants. They responded to the British burning of republican homes by burning those of local loyalists. British intelligence wrote that "many" of their informers in West Cork "were murdered and almost all the remainder suffered grave material loss".

Republicans suspected the involvement of a local "Loyalists civil wing" in the killing of two republicans, the Coffey brothers, in Enniskean in early January 1921. The discovery of documents in Dunmanway by republicans later supposedly confirmed the existence of counter-insurgency espionage in the area, which resulted in many purported informers getting safe passage to England.

British forces were withdrawn from west Cork in February 1922. The only British forces left in the county were two battalions of the British Army in Cork City. The local IRA was almost unanimously anti-Treaty and not under the control of the Provisional Government in Dublin in April 1922. At the time of the Dunmanway killings, none of the leaders of the Anti-Treaty Cork IRA were in the county. Tom Hales and Sean Moylan were in Limerick, along with much of the Third and Fourth Cork IRA Brigades, trying to prevent the occupation of that city's military barracks by Pro-Treaty troops. Tom Barry and Liam Deasy were in Dublin attending an Anti-Treaty IRA meeting. They returned to Cork on 28 April, purportedly with a view to stopping any more killings.

Paul McMahon wrote that the British Government had authorised £2,000 to re-establish intelligence in southern Ireland, especially in Cork, in early April 1922. On 26 April, the day after the raid on Hornibrook home, three British intelligence officers (Lts Hendy, Drove and Henderson) and a driver drove to Macroom with the intention of gathering intelligence in west Cork, where they entered an inn. There, the officers were drugged and taken prisoner by IRA men, taken out of the country to Kilgobnet and then shot and their bodies dumped.

=== In Dunmanway ===
In Dunmanway itself, a company of the Auxiliary Division evacuated their barracks in the workhouse. The IRA found confidential documents and a diary they left behind: these included a list of names. The information – according to historian Meda Ryan – was so precise "only a very well informed spy system could account for some of the entries in the book". Flor Crowley, who analysed the diary, said "it was the work of a man who had many useful 'contacts' not merely in one part of the area but all over it." The list, however, did not contain any of the names of the Protestants killed.

The IRA's Third Cork Brigade had killed 15 informers between 1919 and 1921, according to Tom Barry, adding "for those who are bigots" that the religious breakdown was nine Catholics and six Protestants. Ryan writes, by way of justification, that the Auxiliaries' files showed that some Protestants in Murragh had formed a group known as the Loyalist Action Group, affiliated to the Anti-Sinn Féin League and the Grand Orange Lodge of Ireland. The IRA suspected the group of passing information to British forces during the War of Independence. These included a Black and Tans military intelligence diary. This diary was reproduced with the names excised in The Southern Star newspaper, from 23 October to 27 November 1971, in consecutive editions. Photographs of the diary were published in The Southern Star, which published them again with another article on the intelligence haul in its Centenary Supplement in 1989.

== Killings in Ballygroman ==
On 26 April 1922, a group of anti-Treaty IRA men, led by Michael O'Neill, arrived at the house of Thomas Hornibrook, a former magistrate, at Ballygroman, East Muskerry, Desertmore, Bandon (near Ballincollig on the outskirts of Cork City), seeking to seize his car. Hornibrook was in the house at the time along with his son, Samuel, and his nephew, Herbert Woods (a former Captain in the British Army and MC). O'Neill demanded a part of the engine mechanism (the magneto) that had been removed by Thomas Hornibrook to prevent such theft. Hornibrook refused to give them the part, and after further efforts, some of the IRA party entered through a window. Herbert Woods then shot O'Neill, wounding him fatally. O'Neill's companion, Charlie O'Donoghue, took him to a local priest who pronounced him dead. The next morning O'Donoghue left for Bandon to report the incident to his superiors, returning with "four military men", meeting with the Hornibrooks and Woods, who admitted to shooting O'Neill.

A local jury found Woods responsible and said O'Neill had been "brutally murdered in the execution of his duty". O'Donoghue and Stephen O'Neill, who were present on the night of the killing, both attended the inquest. Some days later, Woods and both Hornibrook men went missing, and in time were presumed killed. The Morning Post newspaper reported that "about 100" IRA men returned from Bandon with O'Neill's comrades and surrounded the house. It reported that a shootout ensued until the Hornibrooks and Woods ran out of ammunition and surrendered. Meda Ryan claims the report in the Morning Post was "exaggerated". Peter Hart writes that the Hornibrooks and Woods surrendered on condition their lives be spared. When Woods admitted it was he who fired the shot that killed O'Neill, he was beaten unconscious, and the three hostages were "driven south into hill country", where they were shot dead. Sometime later the Hornibrook home was burned, the plantation cut down and the land seized.

On 13 April, Michael Collins had complained about British newspaper reports on attacks against Protestants in Ireland to Desmond Fitzgerald. Collins said that while some of the coverage was "fair newspaper comment", the "strain of certain parts is very objectionable". Alice Hodder, a local Protestant from Crosshaven some 23 miles to the southeast, wrote to her mother shortly afterwards about Herbert Woods,

His aunt and uncle had been subject to a lot of persecution and feared an attack, so young Woods went to stay with them. At 2:30 am armed men ... broke in ... Woods fired on the leader and shot him ... They caught Woods, tried him by mock court martial and sentenced him to be hanged ... The brothers of the murdered man then gouged out his eyes while he was alive and then hanged him ... When will the British Government realise that they are really dealing with savages and not ordinary normal human beings?

The letter was forwarded to Lionel Curtis, Secretary of the Cabinet's Irish Committee, on which he appended the comment "this is rather obsolete". Matilda Woods later testified before the Grants Committee, while applying for £5,000 compensation in 1927, that her husband had been drawn and quartered before being killed and that the Hornibrooks were taken to a remote location, forced to dig their own graves and shot dead. Both Ryan and Hart note that Matilda Woods was not in Ireland when her husband disappeared and there is no record of his body ever being located.

== Killings in Dunmanway, Kinneigh, Ballineen, and Clonakilty ==
Over the next two days, ten Protestant men were shot dead in the Dunmanway, Ballineen and Murragh area. In Dunmanway on 27 April, Francis Fitzmaurice (a solicitor and land agent) was shot dead. That same night, David Gray (a chemist) and James Buttimer (a retired draper) were shot in the doorways of their homes in Dunmanway. The next evening, 28 April, in the parish of Kinneigh, Robert Howe and John Chinnery were both shot dead. In the nearby village of Ballineen, sixteen-year-old Alexander McKinley was shot dead in his home.

In Murragh, Reverend Ralph Harbord was shot in the leg but survived; he was the son of Rev. Richard C.M. Harbord, also from the Murragh area, who was the target for his connections to the Loyalist Action Group. Later, west of Ballineen, John Buttimer and his farm employee, Jim Greenfield, were both shot dead. The same night, sixteen-year-old Robert Nagle was shot dead in his home on MacCurtain Hill in Clonakilty, ten miles south. Nagle had been shot in place of his father Thomas, caretaker of the Masonic Hall in Clonakilty whose name was on an IRA list of enemy agents and who had gone into hiding, along with Alexander McKinley's uncle. John Bradfield was shot in place of his brother Henry. Henry Bradfield had been "wanted" by the IRA as they believed he had been providing information leading to IRA "arrests, torture and deaths".

== Aftermath ==
According to Niall Harrington – a Pro-Treaty IRA officer at the time – more than 100 Protestant families fled West Cork in the aftermath of the killings. Alice Hodder in the same letter cited above wrote:

For two weeks there wasn't standing room on any of the boats or mail trains leaving Cork for England. All loyalist refugees who were either fleeing in terror or had been ordered out of the country ... none of the people who did these things, though they were reported as the rebel IRA faction, were ever brought to book by the Provisional Government.

One Cork correspondent for The Irish Times who saw those who had left go through the city noted that, "so hurried was their flight that many had neither a handbag nor an overcoat." Hodder reported that Protestants in the area were being forcibly evicted from their farms by republicans on behalf of the Irish Transport Union, on the basis that they were bringing down wages, although she conceded that the local Pro-Treaty IRA reinstated them after it was informed. Tom Hales, Commandant of O'Neill's Brigade (3rd Cork), ordered that all arms be brought under control while issuing a statement promising that "all citizens in this area, irrespective of creed or class, every protection within my power."

Arthur Griffith echoed Hales' sentiments, although Hales was actively engaged in armed defiance of Griffith's government at this time. Speaking on 28 April in the Dáil, Griffith, President of the Pro-Treaty Irish Provisional Government, stated:

Events, such as the terrible murders at Dunmanway ..., require the exercise of the utmost strength and authority of Dáil Éireann. Dáil Éireann, so far as its powers extend, will uphold, to the fullest extent, the protection of life and property of all classes and sections of the community. It does not know and cannot know, as a National Government, any distinction of class or creed. In its name, I express the horror of the Irish nation at the Dunmanway murders.

Speaking immediately afterwards, anti-treaty TD Seán T. O'Kelly said he wished to associate the "anti-treaty side" in the Dáil with Griffith's sentiments. Speaking in Mullingar on 30 April, the Anti-Treaty leader Éamon de Valera condemned the killings. A general convention of Irish Protestant churches in Dublin released a statement:

Apart from this incident, hostility to Protestants by reason of their religion, has been almost, if not wholly unknown, in the 26 counties in which they are a minority.

However, a deputation of Irish Protestants who met with Winston Churchill in May 1922 told him there was, "nothing to prevent the peasants expropriating [the lands of] every last Protestant loyalist" and that they feared a repeat of the massacres that Protestants had suffered in the Irish Rebellion of 1641 and the 1798 Rebellion. Churchill remarked that the events were "little short of a massacre".

The Belfast News-Letter on 28 April under the headline "Protestants Slain" spoke of "ghastly crimes of the night" and the existence of an appalling state of affairs in the south and west Cork area "where a general massacre of Protestants appears to be in progress". The Northern Whig on 1 May wrote that "it is a matter of notoriety that the murders, far from being unprecedented, are only the last in a long series which began as far back as 1641." Local Cork IRA commanders Tom Barry, Liam Deasy and Seán Moylan, returned to the county and ordered that armed guards be put at the homes of Protestants to prevent further violence. Barry, who had returned immediately from Dublin upon hearing of the killings, ensured that some of those who attempted to take advantage of the situation by stealing livestock owned by Protestants were firmly discouraged.

== Responsibility ==
Recent evidence confirms that the killings were carried out by the IRA even if it is not clear who precisely ordered their execution as no member ever claimed responsibility. Historian Peter Hart has written that the killers were identified by several eyewitness sources as local IRA men. Hart concludes that from two to five separate groups must have done the killing, and writes that they were likely "acting on their own initiative – but with the connivance or acquiescence of local units". Hart's analysis of the identity of the killers has been challenged by other historians, including Rev. Brian Murphy (OSB), Niall Meehan and John Borgonovo.

Hart reported that Clarina Buttimer, a relative of one of those killed (James Buttimer), based on newspaper reports and her 1927 Irish Grants Committee statement, "seem[ed] to have recognised at least one of her husband's attackers". Meehan pointed out that these newspapers reported Buttimer as asserting, "Though there were a number of men there, she only saw one, whom she did not recognise", and that her Grants Committee statement was similar. Meehan wrote that Frank Busteed, the person identified and later omitted without explanation, would have undermined Hart's sectarianism thesis as Busteed, although raised by his Catholic nationalist mother, had a Protestant father.

John Borgonovo in Spies, informers and the 'Anti-Sinn Féin Society', the Intelligence War in Cork City, 1920–21, comments that Hart could "not offer any evidence of the IRA's motivations" for the killings of suspected informers in Cork other than their occupation. Meehan notes Borgonovo's detailed analysis of the IRA in Cork, and that Borgonovo disagreed profoundly with Hart's discounting the IRA's intelligence-gathering capability. Borgonovo described it as "irresponsible" of Hart to discount IRA claims of the Dunmanway victims' guilt in the killing of suspected or known informers without offering an analysis of IRA intelligence-gathering operations. Commenting on Hart's work on the IRA in Cork, he wrote that "While Dr. Hart's conclusions can be suspected, I do not believe they can be sufficiently documented."

At the time the press, including the Belfast Newsletter (1 May 1922), the Irish Times (29 April 1922), and The New York Times, stated that the killings at Dunmanway were in reprisal for the ongoing killings of Catholics in Belfast, such as the McMahon and the Arnon Street killings. Tim Pat Coogan suggests that O'Neill's death precipitated the Dunmanway murders. Hart wrote that the killing of O'Neill "provided the spark" which was inflamed by the "Belfast pogroms" Ryan wrote "The outrages were 'sparked' when Capt. Woods shot IRA man Michael O'Neill in the hallway of Thomas Hornibrooke's house".

The motive(s) for the targeting of the victims also remains a point of contention. Niall Meehan and Rev. Brian P. Murphy (OSB) have each written that the victims were killed because they were informers on behalf of Crown forces, citing an intelligence diary left by Auxiliaries as they evacuated Dunmanway, however the diary contains none of the names of the thirteen murdered men. In 2013, that list was located in the Florence Begley collection in the Bureau of Military History.

Hart posits these were primarily revenge killings, perpetrated without a clear rationale by "angry and frightened young men acting on impulse". He suggests the targets were local Protestant men whose status as enemies in the eyes of the killers was codified in "political language of the day ... landlord, landgrabber, loyalist, imperialist, Orangeman, Freemason, Free Stater, spy, and informer" and continues, "these blanket categories made the victims' individual identities ... irrelevant." Coogan concurred, writing, "the latent sectarianism of centuries of ballads and landlordism claimed ten Protestant lives" that week.

Ryan claims, by way of justification, that all of those killed were described as "committed loyalists" and "extremely anti-Republican". She says that they had been in contact with the Essex Regiment based in Bandon during the conflict, supplying information on the local IRA and that it was "firmly established" later that Fitzmaurice and Gray had been informers, and that their information had done a great deal of damage to the IRA. In Gray's case—as a woman who had been a ten-year-old girl during the Troubles told Ryan—he had allegedly sought out "information from children in their innocence", hence children were warned against talking to him. According to Ryan, Fitzmaurice, Gray, Buttimer and Harbord were associated with the above-mentioned Loyalist Action Group and that all four were involved in espionage. Ryan claimed to have seen, during a 1981 interview with a surviving Cork IRA flying column volunteer named Dan Cahalane, all thirteen names of the Dunmanway victims listed as "helpful citizens" in Auxiliaries' documents found by republicans after the departure of the British forces from southern Ireland.

Hart writes that the term informer was used as a form of "generic abuse" and found "no evidence whatsoever" that they had been active in opposing the IRA. Meehan writes that the killings were not "motivated by either land agitation or by sectarian considerations". Rev. Murphy agrees, citing a British document, A Record of the Rebellion in Ireland in 1920–1921. Meehan and Rev. Murphy conclude "the IRA killings in the Bandon area were motivated by political and not sectarian considerations. Possibly, military considerations, rather than political, would have been a more fitting way to describe the reason for the IRA response to those who informed." because:

[T]he truth was that, as British intelligence officers recognised in the south, the Protestants and those who supported the [UK] Government rarely gave much information because, except by chance, they had not got it to give. An exception to this was in the Bandon area where many Protestant farmers gave information. Although the Intelligence Officer of the area was exceptionally experienced and although the troops were most active it proved almost impossible to protect those brave men, many of whom were murdered while almost all the remainder suffered grave material loss.

Historian John Regan, in his paper, The Bandon Valley Massacre Revisited, argued that the killings might be best understood in light of purported IRA fears that the British were planning a reoccupation of the south of Ireland and was a preemptive move against people believed to have been informers. Regan argued that the selective use of evidence by Peter Hart in an attempt to emphasize a sectarian dimension to the killings highlights a wider problem in the politicization of Irish history.

== TV programme on RTÉ ==
Cork's Bloody Secret, shown on RTÉ on 5 October 2009, dealt with the Dunmanway killings. The programme was produced by Sean O Mealoid, and included interviews with two descendants of two of the Protestants executed. It included a dialogue between two local historians, Donald Woods and Colum Cronin, and featured Prof. John A. Murphy and Eoghan Harris (who later debated the issue in the Irish Times), alongside UCC historian Andy Bielenberg.

== Bibliography ==
- Barry Keane, Massacre in West Cork: The Dunmanway and Ballygroman Killings, Mercier Press, 2014, 288 pp., ISBN 978-1781172032
- Tom Barry, Guerrilla Days in Ireland, (Cork 1997)
- Niall C. Harrington, Kerry Landing, August 1922: An Episode of the Civil War, Anvil Books, 1992:8; ISBN 0-947962-70-0
- Tim Pat Coogan, Michael Collins, Arrow Books (1991); ISBN 978-0-09-968580-7
- Meda Ryan, Tom Barry, IRA Freedom Fighter, (Mercier, 2005) (paper back edition); ISBN 1-85635-480-6
- Peter Hart, The I.R.A. and Its Enemies: Violence and Community in Cork, 1916–1923, Oxford University Press (1999); ISBN 0-19-820806-5
- John M Regan, Myth and the Irish State, Salins (2013); ISBN 0716532123
- Paul McMahon, British Spies and Irish Rebels – British Intelligence and Ireland 1916–1945, (Boydell, 2008); ISBN 978-1-84383-376-5
- John Borgonovo, Spies, Informers and the 'Anti-Sinn Féin Society', The Intelligence War in Cork City, 1920–21 (Kildare 2007); ISBN 0-7165-2833-9
- Rev. Brian Murphy, OSB, The Month, a Review of Christian Thought and World Affairs, September–October 1998
- Rev. Brian Murphy, OSB, Irish Political Review, Vol 20 No. 7 July 2005; ISSN 0790-7672, pages 10–11
- Eoin Neeson, The Civil War 1922–23, (Dublin 1989); ISBN 1-85371-013-X
- John M. Regan, The “Bandon Valley Massacre” as a historical problem’, History, 97/ 325 (Jan., 2012), pp. 70-98.
