= Cahervagliar =

Ringfort in County Cork, Ireland

- Cathair Mhac Laoighaire (Irish)
- Cahirvagliair
- Location within Ireland
- 51.793056°N 8.996944°W
- Type: ringfort and souterrain
- Cultures: Gaelic Ireland
- Location: Cappeen West, Kilmichael, County Cork, Ireland

History
- Built: c. AD 550–900

Site notes
- Material: earth
- Area: 4,200 m^{2} (45,000 sq ft)
- Diameter: 73 m (240 ft)
- Owner: state

National monument of Ireland
- Official name: Cahervagliar
- Reference no.: 233

Cahervagliar is a ringfort (rath) and National Monument (#233) located in County Cork, Ireland.

== Location ==
Cahervagliar is located 5.3 km (3.3 mi) south-southeast of Kilmichael.

== History and description ==
Cahervagliar is a bivallate ringfort, 73 m (240 ft) in diameter with a lintelled stone entrance to the east. The name means "stone ringfort of sons of Lóegaire"; it was the fortress of the Cenél Lóegairi, kings in central Ireland. However, they did not build the fort, as they did not arrive until after 1172.

Ringforts of this type were mostly built c. AD 550–900. Internally people were housed in wooden huts. Local lore claims that Brian Boru was once held hostage here.
