= William Thomas Barnes =

English World War I flying ace

- Born: 10 March 1892; Sutton, Surrey, England
- Died: 28 November 1920 (aged 28); Near Kilmichael, County Cork, Ireland
- Military career
- Allegiance: United Kingdom
- Branch: British Army; Royal Air Force
- Service years: 1914–1920
- Rank: Lieutenant
- Units: Royal Fusiliers; No. 11 Squadron RAF
- Conflicts: World War I; Irish War of Independence; Kilmichael ambush †
- Awards: Distinguished Flying Cross
- Other work: Served as an Auxiliary constable in Ireland

Lieutenant William Thomas Barnes DFC (10 March 1892 – 28 November 1920) was an English World War I flying ace. He served as an observer/gunner in Bristol F.2 Fighters, gaining, in conjunction with his pilots, nine confirmed aerial victories (6 destroyed, 3 'out of control') over German Fokker D.VII fighter planes. Post-war he served in the Royal Irish Constabulary and was killed in the Kilmichael ambush on 28 November 1920.

== Early life and Fusilier service ==
William Thomas Barnes was born in Sutton, Surrey on 10 March 1892. He began his military service in the Royal Fusiliers; he had become a sergeant before he was commissioned a second lieutenant within the regiment on 10 June 1917.

== World War I aviation service ==
Barnes was appointed an Observer Officer in the Royal Air Force on 1 August 1918. He reported for observer duty in the Bristol Fighters of 11 Squadron on 15 August 1918. A week later, on 22 August, he scored his first aerial victory, destroying a Fokker D.VII over Bapaume. A week after that, on 29 August, he drove another Fokker down out of control over Bourlon Wood. The next day, Barnes survived anti-aircraft fire that severely damaged Bristol Fighter serial number D7981. He then ran off a string of four consecutive destructions of Fokker D.VIIs during September, setting one aflame in flight on the 4th, destroying two more on the 16th, and ruining another on the 17th. On the morning of 1 October 1918, he torched another German fighter, and drove one down out of control south of Le Cateau, all in five minutes. His final victory, two days later, was another out of control, northeast of Cambrai. His final tally was six Fokker D.VII fighters destroyed, three driven down out of control.

Barnes was promoted to lieutenant on 10 December 1918, but was retired from the RAF for ill health with a gratuity on 27 or 28 January 1920.

== Post-war career ==
He subsequently joined the Auxiliary Division of the Royal Irish Constabulary, and was one of 16 officers killed by the Irish Republican Army in the Kilmichael Ambush in Ireland on 28 November 1920, during the Irish War of Independence.

== Honours and awards ==
Distinguished Flying Cross

2nd Lt. William Thomas Barnes.

A skilful and gallant observer. On 1 October, during an important reconnaissance, this officer's machine was attacked by six or seven Fokkers; after scattering them he saw an enemy aeroplane attacking one of our machines; he at once engaged it, shooting it down in flames. Shortly afterwards he shot down another enemy machine out of control.
