= Loyalist Action Group =

Loyalist group in County Cork (1920–1922)

- Dates active: 1920–1922
- Active regions: County Cork
- Ideology: Irish unionism

The Loyalist Action Group was a secret loyalist group active in County Cork during the Irish War of Independence. It was made up of local Protestant unionists who opposed Irish republicanism. The group helped British forces by gathering intelligence on the IRA and local republicans. It is also alleged to have been involved in the killing of several republicans, most notably the Coffey brothers, who were shot in their home in Enniskean in February 1921. In that year the IRA found intelligence documents belonging to the British Auxiliary Division in Dunmanway, which apparently confirmed the existence of the group, and included a list of names of informers. This resulted in many informers being granted safe passage and protection in England by the British government. During the conflict, the local IRA brigade executed 15 informers, six of whom were Protestants. In April 1922, after a truce had come into effect, IRA members shot dead 13 Protestants in the Dunmanway area. It was claimed they were members of this action group, but this is disputed.

The group was said to be affiliated with the Anti-Sinn Féin League, an all-island body led by prominent businessmen; it had close connections to the British military and the Orange Order.
