= Peter Hart (historian) =

Canadian historian (1963–2010)

- Born: 11 November 1963; St. John's, Newfoundland
- Died: 22 July 2010 (aged 46); St. John's, Newfoundland
- Occupation: Historian

Academic background
- Education: Trinity College Dublin
- Thesis: The Irish Republican Army and its enemies: violence and community in County Cork, 1917–1923 (1993)

Peter Hart (11 November 1963 – 22 July 2010) was a Canadian historian, specializing in modern Irish history.

== Life ==
Hart was born and raised in St. John's, Newfoundland. He studied for one year at the Memorial University of Newfoundland before moving to study at Queen's University in Kingston, Ontario. He graduated from there with an Honours BA degree. Subsequently, Hart completed a master's degree in International Relations at Yale University.

Hart then moved to Ireland to do PhD work at Trinity College, Dublin. His thesis was on the Irish Republican Army in County Cork, an epicenter of the Irish War of Independence, which was the basis of his first book, The IRA and its Enemies (1999). After completing his doctorate in 1993, Hart accepted a five-year teaching and research position at Queen's University Belfast. In 2003, having completed this contract, Hart moved back to Canada to take up the position of Canada Research Chair in Irish Studies at the Memorial University of Newfoundland. He was also an associate professor at Memorial University.

In the 1990s, he developed cancer and underwent a liver transplant - events which permanently affected his health. He suffered a brain haemorrhage early in July 2010 and died on 22 July 2010 in a St. John's hospital at the age of 46.

== Works ==
Hart published several books on what he termed the "Irish Revolution" of 1916–1923, arguing that events like the Easter Rising (1916), the Irish War of Independence (1920–1921) and the Irish Civil War (1922–1923) were parts of a greater whole.

The first book was published in 1998 entitled The IRA and Its Enemies, Violence and Community in Cork, 1916–1923, being a study of the organisation's social composition and activity in County Cork during the War of Independence. This book won several awards, including the Christopher Ewart-Biggs Memorial Prize (1998). It attracted significant criticism.

In 2002, Hart edited British Intelligence in Ireland 1920–21: The Final Reports, a re-print of official British Government reports released to the British Public Records Office that detailed British military and intelligence analysis of policy during the Irish rebellion from 1919–1921.

The I.R.A. at War 1916–1923 (Oxford University Press, 2003), is a collection of essays on various social, political and military aspects of the IRA in these years. The publication represented, Hart wrote in its preface, "sixteen years' work on the history of the Irish revolution."

Hart contributed to the volume The Irish Revolution (2002), a collection of articles by various historians of the period.

Hart's final published work was a biography of the Irish revolutionary leader Michael Collins, entitled Mick - The Real Michael Collins (Macmillan, 2006).

== Review and criticism ==
Times Higher Education suggested in 2008 that Hart's work "offers a revisionist version of events that proved highly controversial". Hart denied he was a "revisionist", calling the term "pejorative labelling". In his review of The IRA at War, 1916–1923, John M. Regan wrote in 2004:

"Hart is neither a statist nor a southern nationalist, though the influence of both ideologies can be traced through his work. His research on localised and specialised topics subverts orthodoxy, but it is his willingness to embrace it when dealing with general explanations that surprises. His exploration of the plight of Protestants in the Free State illuminates the sectarian underbelly of the revolution that nationalist historiography prefers to ignore. In escalating violence in Cork, Tipperary, or Dublin could Michael Collins, Harry Boland, or Ernie O'Malley be held accountable for raising sectarian tensions in Antrim, Down or Belfast? Was the cost of a southern state the institutionalisation of ethno-religious tensions in a compressed and reactionary northern state? Could revolutionary violence in 1922 and 1968 conceivably be part of one grotesque, protracted process? To accept this argument would, however, be to shatter nationalist icons important to a southern nationalist identity still rooted in its own glorious revolution."

Some of Hart's published claims attracted criticism from other historians and writers, including two incidents in The IRA and its Enemies. One was the Kilmichael Ambush of 28 November 1920. Hart challenged the account of commander Tom Barry who stated the Auxiliaries engaged in a false surrender that caused two IRA fatalities, after which Barry refused further surrender calls and ordered a fight to the finish without prisoners. Hart posited this never happened and alleged that Barry ordered the killing of all prisoners.

Hart claimed he personally interviewed two anonymous ambush veterans in 1988–1989 and listened to recorded interviews with three further unnamed Kilmichael veterans. The recordings (known as 'the Chisholm tapes') were made in 1970 by Father John Chisholm as research for Liam Deasy's Toward Ireland Free (1973). Meda Ryan, author of Tom Barry, IRA Freedom Fighter (2003), questioned Hart's claim to have interviewed two Kilmichael veterans in 1988 and 1989, claiming only one, Edward "Ned" Young, was still alive from 1987–1989. Ryan reported him too ill to have contributed to Hart's research. This assertion was supported in an affidavit published in 2008 by Ned Young's son, John. Ned Young died aged 97 on 13 November 1989. According to Ryan (and 1980s newspaper accounts) The second last surviving Kilmichael veteran, Jack O'Sullivan, died in December 1986. However, Hart dated an additional interview with his second anonymous Kilmichael veteran on 19 November 1989, six days after Ned Young died. Hart claimed his interviewee was an unarmed ambush scout, although the last ambush scout, Dan O'Driscoll, reportedly died in 1967. The last dispatch scout, Seán Falvey, died in 1971. Hart's earlier 1992 PhD thesis, on which his book is based, did not describe this 19 November 1989 interviewee as an unarmed scout. In his thesis, Hart described touring around the Kilmichael ambush site with this interviewee, a claim withdrawn from the book.

Niall Meehan, Head of the Journalism and Media Faculty in Griffith College, Dublin, questioned Hart's claims with regard to the "Chisholm tapes", in a review of David Fitzpatrick (ed.), Terror in Ireland 1916–1923 (2012). A chapter on the Kilmichael ambush by Eve Morrison was based partially on access to the tapes. She reported two (not three as Hart stated) Kilmichael veterans recorded in 1970 by Chisholm speaking on the ambush. One of these two was Ned Young. The other recorded interviewee, Jack O'Sullivan, spoke words which were misattributed by Hart to the ambush scout he claimed he interviewed on 19 November 1989. Meehan asserted that "this misattribution... further questions the existence of Hart's 1988 and 1989 veteran interviews". The discussion resumed in 2022 with a book on the Kilmichael Ambush, defending Hart, by Eve Morrison, to which Niall Meehan responded.

The second controversy surrounds the Dunmanway killings, in which thirteen Protestant men and boys were shot dead between 27–29 April 1922 during the truce between the IRA and the British forces. Hart wrote of ten of the killings, "these men were shot because they were Protestant". Others point to evidence suggesting that, while the IRA action was unauthorised, the men were targeted due to allegations they were informers, not because of their religion. Again, criticism centered on Hart's use of evidence. In his review of The IRA and its Enemies (The Month, September–October 1998) Brian Murphy noted Hart's citation of a British intelligence assessment in the Record of the Rebellion in Ireland that "in the south the Protestants and those who supported the Government rarely gave much information because, except by chance, they had not got it to give." Murphy pointed out that Hart had omitted the following sentence:

An exception to this rule was in the Bandon area where there were many Protestant farmers who gave information. Although the Intelligence Officer of the area was exceptionally experienced and although the troops were most active it proved almost impossible to protect those brave men, many of whom were murdered while almost all the remainder suffered grave material loss.

As the April killings took place in "the Bandon area", Brian Murphy queried apparent suppression of evidence contradicting Hart's conclusion. This has been echoed in further discussion.

Hart situated the Dunmanway killings in the context of an enduring culture of violent sectarian animosity which he claimed ultimately led to the "ethnic cleansing" of tens of thousands of southern Irish Protestants in county Cork and across Southern Ireland between 1920 and 1923. Discovery of a hitherto hidden violent sectarian culture culminating in mass expulsions created a plausible context for the Dunmanway killings. However, later research published by Barry Keane, and Hart's doctoral supervisor at TCD David Fitzpatrick was unable to corroborate Hart's statistical analysis. In a refereed article published in 2022, John M. Regan identified that coinciding with the revolutionary tumult of 1920–1923, all of Hart's datasets identifying a precipitous decline in the southern Protestant population in Southern Ireland were misreported and greatly exaggerated. How all of Hart's datasets came to confirm the same erroneous pattern of decline is unknown.

Not quoting the sentence in the British Army's Record of the Rebellion in Ireland identifying that in Southern Ireland loyalist espionage around Bandon was exceptional, Hart attributed the killing of local Protestant's to the violent sectarian culture he misidentified rather than to the bitter intelligence war waged between the British forces and the IRA. Omitting the one sentence identifying Bandon's exceptionalism ensured the superficial plausibility of Hart's ethnic conflict thesis.

Hart stood by his work, stating that critics have failed to "engage with the book's larger arguments about the nature of the IRA and the Irish Revolution" and believing they are closed to "a real debate where people concede some things and put forward others or are skeptical about weak points and accept the strong points." In his essay 'A new revolutionary history' Hart wrote "From 1922 on, government in the south would be self-determined". This concept of self-determination was important to the definition of "revolution" Hart employed, which was defined by the transfer of sovereignty from the pre- to the post-revolutionary regime. "What was revolutionary", Hart said about the Irish revolution, "was that Irish people had fought for and won their sovereignty [in 1922]". Yet Southern Ireland, later the Irish Free State, and after 1937 Éire, or Ireland in the English language, did not establish full sovereignty until the enactment of the Republic of Ireland Act (1948). Until the passing of the Statute of Westminster in 1931, the Dáil remained subservient to the imperial parliament at Westminster. Neither did Irish people win their sovereignty who fought for their freedom but found themselves living in Northern Ireland after 1921. The casual equation of the "Irish people" with the southern state and the assumption that in 1922 the new Irish state was sovereign are constructions of southern Irish nationalism, not historical scholarship.

Hart's last known interview, speaking in English, was in a TG4 Irish language programme on Tom Barry, broadcast in January 2011. The programme questioned Hart's use of anonymous sources and other claims. More of the interview was broadcast in December 2022, in a documentary on the April 1922 killings.

In his 2011 book, Michael Collins and the Anglo-Irish War: Britain's Failed Counterinsurgency, author J.B.E. Hittle, a retired U.S. career intelligence officer-turned historian, acknowledged Hart's overall contribution in re-examining standard histories of the period, but concluded that Hart's historical method is "problematic". Hittle cited Hart's "overall naivete" about guerrilla warfare, in particular, what he viewed as Hart's underestimation of the importance of certain counterintelligence cases to the outcome of the war, as well as faulty methodologies.

Probably due to the degree of controversy Hart had aroused, his entry in the Dictionary of Irish Biography was written, not by a historian specialising in the Irish revolution, but by John Gibney, associate editor, whose specialty is the seventeenth century.

Memorial University, Hart's alma mater, has established the Professor Peter Hart Memorial Scholarship in Hart's memory and his papers are located in the University's archives.

== Publications ==
- The I.R.A. & Its Enemies, Violence and Community in Cork, 1916–1923. Oxford University Press. 1998. ISBN 978-0-19-820537-1.
- The I.R.A. at War, 1916–1923. Oxford University Press. 2003. ISBN 978-0-19-925258-9.
- Mick – The Real Michael Collins. Viking Adult. 2005. ISBN 978-0-670-03147-4.
