= Mike McCarthy (journalist) =

British journalist

Mike McCarthy is a former reporter in the north of England, who worked as a presenter for BBC Look North before becoming Sky News’ bureau chief in Manchester. His team won an O2 journalism award in the North West. He has covered many of the big stories in the North of England spanning from the Hillsborough disaster to the 2011 Manchester riots and the 2015 floods in Cumbria, Lancashire and York. He is a former winner of the BT Journalist of the Year award for the North East.

Cases covered include the shooting of Manchester police officers Fiona Bone and Nicola Hughes, the disappearance of Welsh schoolgirl April Jones and the Manchester Arena bomb attack.

McCarthy has covered major international events in Afghanistan, Iraq, Israel and Washington DC. He reported live during riots from the centre of Athens and on the Boston Marathon bombings in the US, and the storming of the Canadian parliament in Ottawa in 2014.

Educated in Derbyshire, Mike McCarthy studied journalism before working in commercial radio. Prior to joining Sky in 2000, he worked for the BBC in Leeds and London.

He occasionally lectures at universities.

== Family Life and Charitable Work ==
After his son Ross took his own life in February 2021. Mike McCarthy drew attention to the pressures on people during the COVID-19 pandemic, and called for more mental health support for men.

McCarthy then connected with Steve Phillip, a prominent keynote speaker in the world of social media and sales & marketing, who had also lost his own son to suicide in December 2019. The two joined forces with the aim to create hope for others facing the despair their sons had faced and they became passionate advocates for change in UK suicide prevention policy.

They began a campaign for better mental health support and in June 2022 the pair met with then Health Secretary Sajid Javid MP and secured his endorsement and support for the Baton of Hope campaign announced on BBC Breakfast the following day.

The Baton Of Hope UK is now a registered charity with McCarthy as the founding director and spokesman. He and the rapidly growing charity are currently spearheading a new campaign to get businesses and employers to remove stigma around mental health in the workplace and to make suicide awareness, support and prevention a workplace priority.
