= St Bartholomew's Church, Castletown-Kinneigh =

Anglican church in Cork, Ireland

Coordinates: 51°45′51″N 8°58′30″W

St Bartholomew's Church
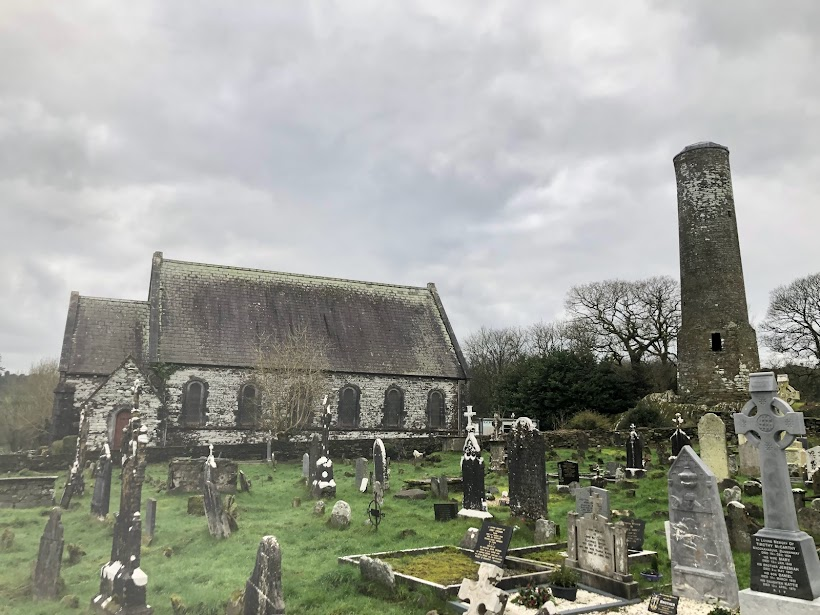
- St Batholomew's Church, with Kinneigh Round Tower visible behind.
- St Bartholomew's Church
- Country: Ireland
- Denomination: Church of Ireland

Architecture
- Architect: Joseph Welland
- Style: Romanesque
- Completed: 1856

National monument of Ireland
- Official name: Kinneigh Round Tower
- Reference no.: 618

St Bartholomew's Church is a small Romanesque Anglican church located in Castletown-Kinneigh, County Cork, Ireland. It was completed in 1856, and is dedicated to Bartholomew the Apostle. It is part of the Kinneigh Union of Parishes in the Diocese of Cork, Cloyne, and Ross. Kinneigh Round Tower (Irish: Cloigtheach Chionn Eich) is located on the church grounds, and is the only round tower in Ireland with a hexagonal base.

== History ==
Following the destruction of a 7th-century monastic site by Vikings, a new monastery was built at the present site of the church, and the round tower was erected. The current church building was completed in 1856, replacing an earlier church from 1794.

A memorial to Richard O'Sullivan Burke is located on the exterior walls of the church grounds.

== Architecture ==
St Bartholomew's is built in the Romanesque style, and features a six-bay nave, a single-bay chancel, and a vestry.

== Round tower ==
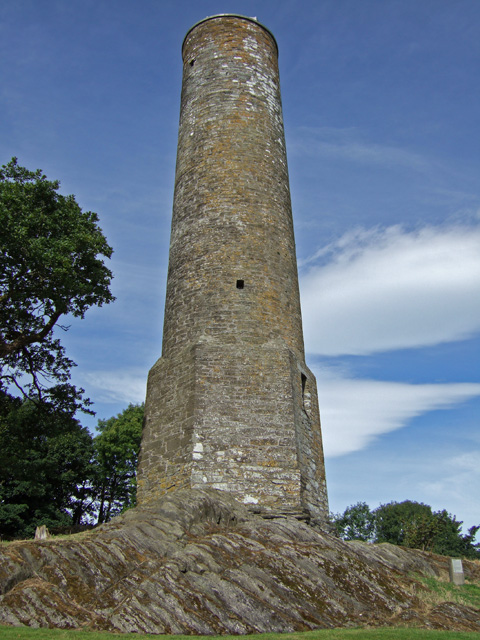
A close-up of the tower, showing the hexagonal base.

Kinneigh Round Tower is the only surviving feature of a monastery founded by St Mocholmóg in the 7th century, though the tower itself was likely not built until the 11th century. During the mid-19th century it was in use as a bell tower. The tower currently stands at 67.25 feet (20.50 m), though it would likely have originally stood 95 feet (29 m) high or even taller.
