= Castletown-Kinneigh =

Village in County Cork, Ireland

Castletown-Kinneigh Baile Chaisleáin Chinn Eich
- Village
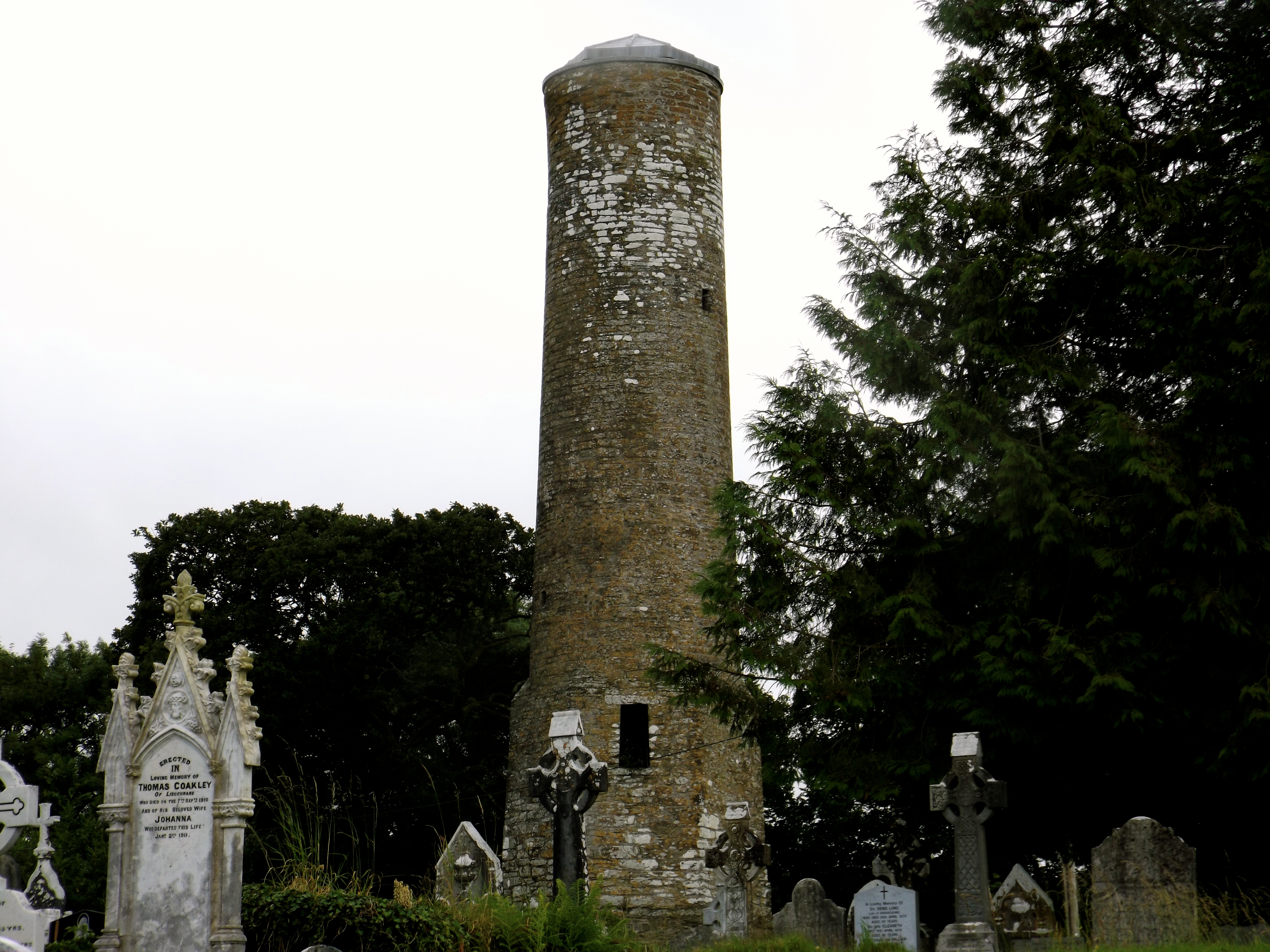
- Kinneigh Round Tower

- Location in Ireland
- Coordinates: 51.769°N 8.954°W
- Country: Ireland
- Province: Munster
- County: County Cork
- Time zone: UTC+0 (WET)
  - Summer (DST): UTC-1 (IST (WEST))

Castletown-Kinneigh (Irish: Baile Chaisleáin Chinn Eich), also known as Castletownkenneigh or simply as either Castletown or Kinneigh, is a small rural village near Ballineen in County Cork, Ireland. Castletown village has one pub.

== History ==
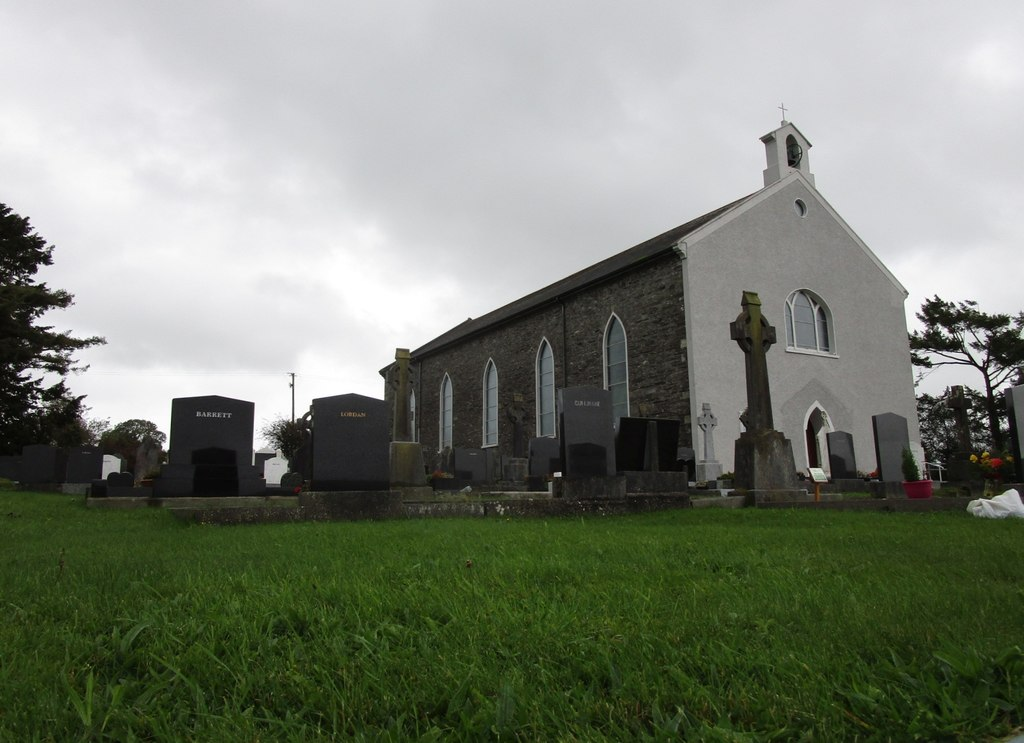
St. Joseph's Catholic Church, Castletown

Evidence of ancient settlement in the area includes a number of ringfort, souterrain and holy well sites in the townlands of Castletown, Garland and Sleenoge.

In Sleenoge townland, to the west of Castletown village, is a round tower. Kinneigh Round Tower, which dates to the early 11th century, is within an earlier 7th century monastic enclosure associated with St. Mocholmóg. It is protected as a national monument and maintained by the Office of Public Works. The tower was used as a bell tower for a period for the nearby St. Bartholomew's Church. This Church of Ireland church is in the Kinneigh Union of the Diocese of Cork, Cloyne and Ross.

The local Catholic church, in Enniskeane & Desertserges Parish within the Roman Catholic Diocese of Cork and Ross, contains an altar sculpture by John Hogan which dates to 1845.

== Sport ==
The area is home to the Diarmuid Ó Mathúna's GAA club, which was founded in 1968. The local soccer team, Castletown Celtic FC, has historically played in the West Cork League, a twelfth level division in the Republic of Ireland football league system.

An autograss track, associated with the Cork Autograss Racing Club, is located near the village.

In July 2024, the Castletownkenneigh area hosted the All-Ireland road bowling championships.

== See also ==
- List of towns and villages in Ireland
