= Kilmichael ambush =

IRA ambush of 1920 during the Irish War of Independence

- Part of the Irish War of Independence
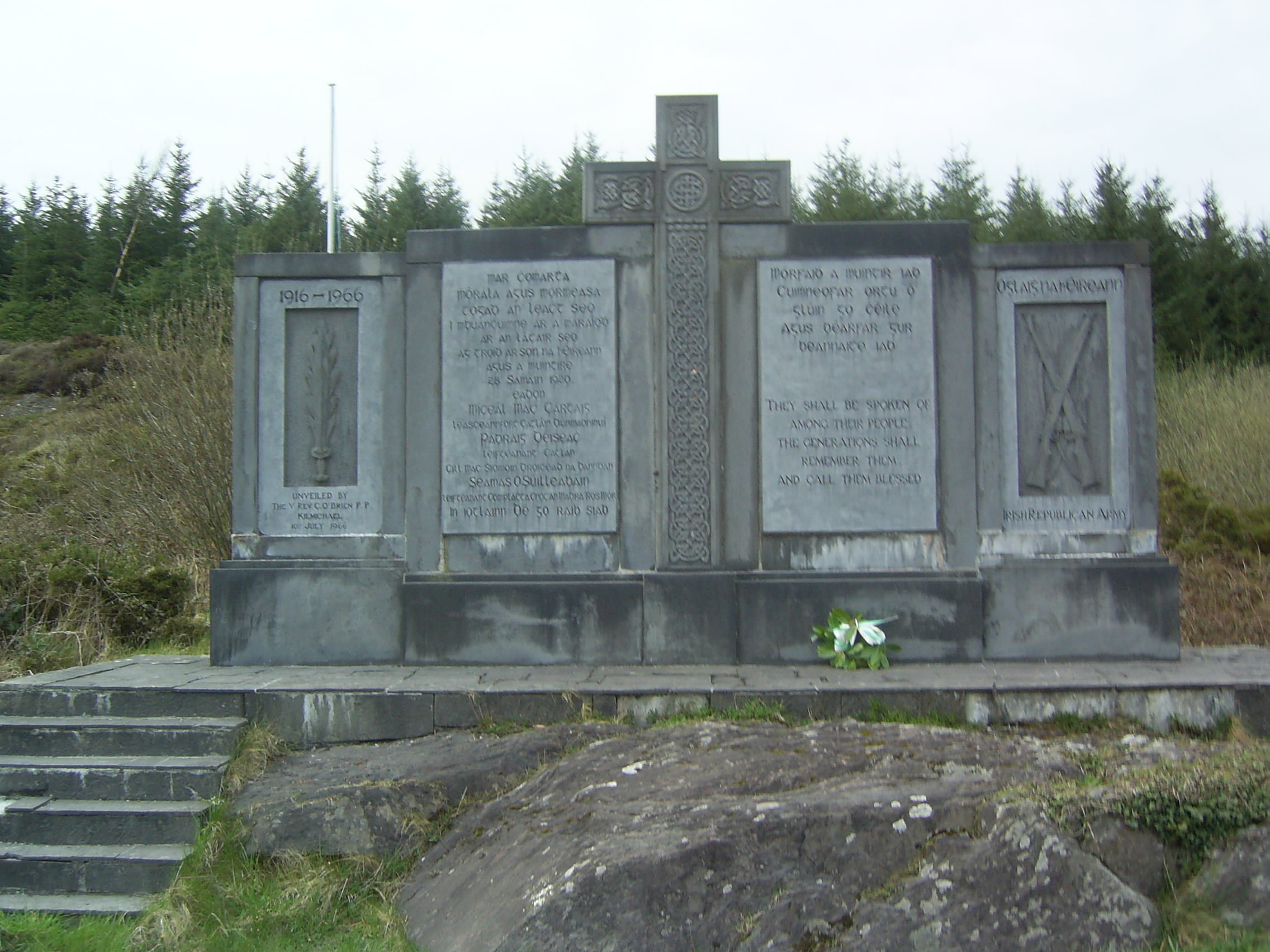
- Monument at the ambush site
Date	28 November 1920
Location	Near Kilmichael, County Cork 51°48′43″N 9°02′20″W
Result	IRA victory

Belligerents
Irish Republican Army (West Cork Brigade)	(United Kingdom of Great Britain and Ireland) Royal Irish Constabulary (Auxiliary Division)

Commanders and leaders
Tom Barry	(United Kingdom of Great Britain and Ireland) Francis Crake †

Strength
36 volunteers	18 officers

Casualties and losses
3 killed 2 wounded	16 killed 2 wounded
- Location within County Cork

The Kilmichael ambush (Irish: Luíochán Chill Mhichíl) was an attack carried out on 28 November 1920 by the Irish Republican Army (IRA) near the village of Kilmichael, County Cork, during the Irish War of Independence. Thirty-six local IRA volunteers commanded by Tom Barry killed sixteen members of the Royal Irish Constabulary's Auxiliary Division. The Kilmichael ambush was politically as well as militarily significant. It occurred one week after Bloody Sunday and marked an escalation in the IRA's campaign.

== Background ==
The Auxiliaries were recruited from former commissioned officers in the British Army. The force was raised in July 1920 and were promoted as a highly trained elite force by the British media. In common with most of their colleagues, the Auxiliaries engaged at Kilmichael were World War I veterans.

The Auxiliaries and the previously introduced Black and Tans rapidly became highly unpopular in Ireland due to intimidation of the civilian population and arbitrary reprisals after IRA actions – including burnings of businesses and homes, beatings and killings. A week before the Kilmichael ambush, after IRA assassinations of British intelligence operatives in Dublin on Bloody Sunday, Auxiliaries fired on players and spectators at a Gaelic football match in Croke Park Dublin, killing fourteen civilians (thirteen spectators and one player).

The Auxiliaries in Cork were based in the town of Macroom, and in November 1920 they carried out a number of raids on the villages in the surrounding area, including Dunmanway, Coppeen and Castletown-Kinneigh, to intimidate the local population away from supporting the IRA. They shot dead one civilian James Lehane (Séamus Ó Liatháin) at Ballymakeera on 17 October 1920. In his memoir, Guerilla Days in Ireland, Tom Barry noted that before Kilmichael the IRA hardly fired a shot at the Auxiliaries, which "had a very serious effect on the morale of the whole people as well as on the IRA". Barry's assessment was that the West Cork IRA needed a successful action against the Auxiliaries in order to be effective.

On October 31st, Barry assembled a flying column of 36 riflemen with them regrouping on November 21st in preparation of the ambush. The column had 35 rounds for each rifle as well as a handful of revolvers and two Mills bombs (hand grenades). Barry scouted possible ambush sites with Captain Michael McCarthy on horseback and selected one on the Macroom–Dunmanway road, on the section between Kilmichael and Gleann, which the Auxiliaries coming out of Macroom used every day. The flying column marched there on foot and reached the ambush site on the night of 27 November. The IRA volunteers took up positions in the low rocky hills on either side of the road. Unlike most IRA ambush positions, there was no obvious escape route for the guerrillas should the fighting go against them.

== The ambush ==
As dusk fell between 4:05 and 4:20 pm on 28 November, the ambush took place on a road at Dus a' Bharraigh in the townland of Shanacashel, Kilmichael Parish, near Macroom.

Just before the Auxiliaries in two lorries came into view, two armed IRA volunteers, responding late to Barry's mobilisation order, drove unwittingly into the ambush position in a horse and side-car, almost shielding the British forces behind them. Barry managed to avert their detection by directing the car up a side road and out of the way.

The first Auxiliary lorry was persuaded to slow down by Barry standing on the road in plain sight in front of a concealed Command Post (with three riflemen). He was wearing an IRA officer's tunic given to him by IRA Volunteer and ambush participant Paddy O'Brien. The British later claimed Barry was wearing a British uniform. This confusion was part of a ruse by Barry to ensure that his adversaries in both lorries halted beside two separated IRA ambush positions on the north side of the road, where Sections One (10 riflemen) and Two (10 riflemen) lay concealed. Hidden on the opposite (south) side of the road was half of Section Three (six riflemen), whose instructions were to prevent the enemy from taking up positions on that side. The other half of Section Three (six riflemen) was positioned before the ambush position as an insurance group, should a third Auxiliary lorry appear. The British later alleged that over 100 IRA fighters were present wearing British uniforms and steel trench helmets. Barry, however, insisted that, excepting himself, the ambush party were in civilian attire, though they used captured British weapons and equipment.

The first lorry, containing nine Auxiliaries, slowed almost to a halt close to the intended ambush position. At that point Barry blew a whistle and threw a Mills bomb that exploded in the open cab of the first lorry. Both occupants, the driver and Macroom Auxiliary commander District Inspector Francis Crake, were killed. The whistle was the signal to open fire. A savage close-quarters fight ensued, between surviving Auxiliaries and a combination of IRA Section One and Barry's three person Command Post group. According to Barry's account, some of the British were killed using rifle butts and bayonets in a brutal and bloody encounter. This close-quarters part of the engagement was over relatively quickly, with all nine Auxiliaries dead or dying. The British claimed that the bodies of the dead "suffered terrible mutilation as though hacked with hatchets", although Barry dismissed this report as atrocity propaganda.

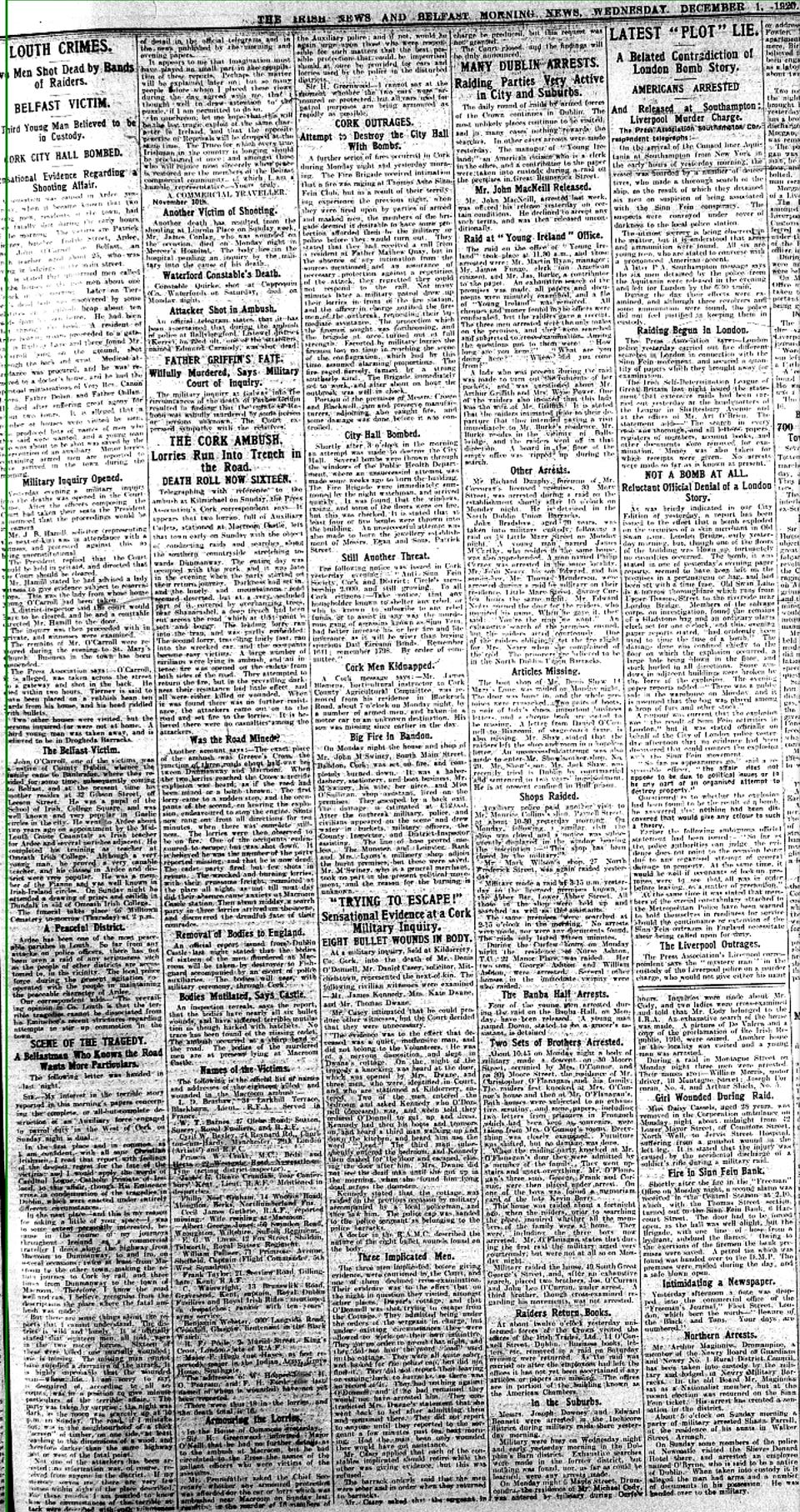
An Irish press report on the ambush

Fire was opened simultaneously at nine Auxiliaries in the second Auxiliary lorry, in the ambush position close to IRA Section Two. This lorry's occupants were in a more advantageous position than Auxiliaries in the first lorry, being further away from the ambushing group. Reportedly, they dismounted to the road and exchanged fire with the IRA, killing Michael McCarthy. Barry then brought the Command Post soldiers who had completed the attack on the first lorry to bear on this group. Barry reported that surviving Auxiliaries called out a surrender and that some dropped their rifles. They then reportedly opened fire again with revolvers when three IRA men emerged from cover, killing one volunteer instantly, Jim O'Sullivan, and mortally wounding Pat Deasy. Barry then said he ordered, "Rapid fire and do not stop until I tell you!". Barry stated that he ignored a subsequent attempt by remaining Auxiliaries to surrender, ordering his men to keep firing at a range of ten yards (9.1 m) or less, until he believed all of the Auxiliaries were dead. Barry said of the Auxiliaries who tried to surrender a second time, "soldiers who had cheated in war deserved to die." Barry referred to this episode as the Auxiliaries' "false surrender".

Barry's account in 1949 can be compared with other IRA veteran testimony. In 1937 Section Three commander Stephen O'Neill published a first participant account of an Auxiliary false surrender, though without using that actual term. O'Neil wrote:

"The O/C Tom Barry, with three of the section responsible for the destruction of the first [Auxiliary] lorry, came to our assistance, with the result that the attack was intensified. On being called on to surrender, they signified their intention of doing so, but when we ceased at the O/C's command, fire was again opened by the Auxiliaries, with fatal results to two of our comrades who exposed themselves believing the surrender was genuine. We renewed the attack vigorously and never desisted until the enemy was annihilated."

Some Bureau of Military History (BMH) accounts do not mention a false surrender, for example Section Three volunteer Ned Young's 1955 Witness Statement, published in 2003 (WS 1,402). However, Young stated he had left his position to individually pursue an escaping Auxiliary when the false surrender incident took place. Nevertheless, in a 1970 audio interview Young reported that other veterans told him afterwards of an Auxiliary false surrender. Tim Keohane, who claimed controversially in his BMH statement (WS 1,295) to have participated in the ambush, described a false surrender event. He recalled that when Section Two and the Command Post group engaged the second lorry that:

"Tom Barry called on the enemy to surrender and some of them put up their hands, but when our party were moving onto the road, the Auxiliaries again opened fire. Two of our men were wounded".

Barry stated that two of the IRA dead, Pat Deasy and Jim O'Sullivan, were shot during the false surrender episode, but Keohane reported that O'Sullivan had been hit earlier, and that Jack Hennessy and John Lordan were wounded after they stood to take the surrender. Ambush veteran Ned Young reported (see above) being told afterwards that Lordon bayoneted an Auxiliary he believed had surrendered falsely. Hennessy described in his BMH statement (WS 1,234) an incident in which, after Michael McCarthy was shot dead, he stood and shouted "hands up" to an auxiliary who had "thrown down his rifle". Hennessy reported the auxiliary then "drew his revolver", causing Hennessy to "shoot him dead".

IRA veterans reported variously that wounded Auxiliaries, finished off after the firefight, were killed with close range shots, blows from rifle butts and bayonet thrusts. Ambush participant Jack O'Sullivan told historian Meda Ryan that, after he disarmed an Auxiliary, "He was walking him up the road as a prisoner when a shot dropped him at his feet". Barry did not engage in this level of detail in his account of the first lorry confrontation, or after the false surrender event. They are consistent with his order to continue fighting to the finish after the false surrender attempt, refusing further surrender attempts.

After fighting ceased it was observed that two IRA volunteers – Michael McCarthy and Jim O'Sullivan – were dead and that Pat Deasy (brother of Liam Deasy) was mortally wounded. The IRA fighters thought they had killed all of the Auxiliaries. In fact two survived, one very badly injured, while another who escaped was later captured and shot dead. Among the 16 British dead on the road at Kilmichael was Francis Crake, commander of the Auxiliaries in Macroom, probably killed at the start of the action by Barry's Mills bomb.

The severity of his injuries probably saved Frederick Henry Forde (also referred to as H.F. Forde). He was left for dead at the ambush site with, amongst other injuries, a bullet wound to his head. Forde was picked up by British forces the following day and taken to hospital in Cork. He was later awarded £10,000 in compensation. The other surviving Auxiliary, Cecil Guthrie (ex Royal Air Force), was badly wounded but escaped from the ambush site. He asked for help at a nearby house. However, unknown to him, two IRA men were staying there. They killed him with his own gun and dumped his body in Annahala bog. In 1926, on behalf of the Guthrie family, Kevin O'Higgins, Irish Free State Minister for Home Affairs, interceded with the local IRA, after which Guthrie's remains were disinterred and buried in the Church of Ireland graveyard at Macroom.

Many IRA volunteers were deeply shaken by the severity of the action, referred to by Barry as "the bloodiest in Ireland", and some were physically sick. Barry attempted to restore discipline by making them form up and perform drill before marching away. Barry himself collapsed with severe chest pains on 3 December and was secretly hospitalised in Cork City. It is possible that the ongoing stress of being on the run and commander of the flying column, along with a poor diet as well as the intense combat at Kilmichael, contributed to his illness, diagnosed as heart displacement.

== Aftermath ==
Soon after the ambush, The Times of London described the engagement as a "brutal massacre" of the Auxiliary Division. This, along with other reports in the British media, "had a chilling effect on all members of the crown forces"; British claims of killing disarmed or surrendered Auxiliaries portrayed the IRA as having "descended to a new level of brutality." One day after the ambush, IRA volunteers from the Cork No. 1 Brigade abducted and killed civilians James and Frederick Blemens, believing them to be British spies. Four days later on 2 December, 3 volunteers were ambushed and killed by soldiers from the Essex Regiment after contacting a British deserter.

In response to news of the ambush and Bloody Sunday on successive Sundays, barriers were installed on both ends of Downing Street in London to protect 10 Downing Street from IRA attacks. The Chief Secretary of Ireland, Sir Hamar Greenwood, reported the ambush to the British Parliament; historians Gerry White and Brendan O'Shea noted that Greenwood's denunciation failed to prevent a Labour Party delegation from travelling to Ireland to ascertain the reality of the ongoing conflict.

The bodies of the killed Auxiliaries were sent to England after a lavish funeral procession through Cork on 2 December, which was provided with a military and police escort and attended by numerous prominent dignitaries from the British Army, Roman Catholic Church and Royal Irish Constabulary. After the procession, the Auxiliary Division increased their mistreatment of the County Cork population, to the extent that "no person was safe from their molestations." On 10 December, martial law was declared in response to the ambush in the counties of Cork, Kerry, Limerick and Tipperary. The next day, angered British forces burned sections of the city centre of Cork, preventing the city's fire brigade from putting out the fires for a period of time. Two IRA volunteers were shot dead while asleep, their killers most likely being Auxiliaries.

== Controversy ==
Accounts from the British press alleged that the search party that found the Auxiliary casualties the following morning believed that many of them had been "butchered". Local Coroner Dr Jeremiah Kelleher told the military Court of Inquiry at Macroom on 30 November 1920 that he carried out a "superficial examination" on the bodies. He found that one of the dead, an Auxiliary named William Pallister, had a "wound ... inflicted after death by an axe or some similar heavy weapon". He stated that three suffered shotgun wounds at close range. The subsequently publicised term "butchered" was derived from a military witness, Lieutenant H.G. Hampshire, who said, "From my experience as a soldier I should imagine that about four had been killed instantaneously and the others butchered".

The principal published source for what happened at the Kilmichael Ambush is Tom Barry's Guerrilla Days in Ireland, (1949) which derided British accounts as atrocity propaganda. The first by a participant, Stephen O'Neill (reported above), appeared in 1937 (republished in Rebel Cork's Fighting Story, 1947, 2009). The first account of a false surrender event at Kilmichael appeared in June 1921, seven months later, in the British Empire journal Round Table by Lionel Curtis, citing a "trustworthy" source in the area. Curtis was British Prime Minister Lloyd George's secretary during Anglo-Irish Treaty negotiations. A second British account, in former Auxiliary commander F.P. Crozier's Ireland Forever (1932), also gave a brief account of the same false surrender event. Piaras Beaslaí noted a false surrender in his Michael Collins and the Making of a New Ireland in 1926, published also in two daily newspapers. Ernie O'Malley's 1936 memoir, On Another Man's Wound, noted the incident also. A 1924 letter to Free State Army headquarters concerning IRA casualty Michael McCarthy, released in 2021 by the Bureau of Military History, confirmed the contemporary perception of a false surrender.

In The IRA And Its Enemies, Newfoundland historian Professor Peter Hart took issue with Tom Barry's false surrender account. He mistakenly claimed that Crozier's in 1932 was the first published account and also a concoction, allegedly later used by Barry for his own purposes. Hart stated that a November 1932 newspaper account by Barry in the Irish Press, without a false surrender narrative, demonstrated that Barry made up the story later. In response, Irish historian Media Ryan said, citing a letter soon afterwards to the editor from Barry, that a false surrender narrative had been edited out and that Barry queried the omission. Hart asserted that surviving Auxiliary officers were killed after surrendering. The controversy Hart's claims generated has resulted in the ambush being discussed alongside them.

Hart's use of anonymous interviews with ambush veterans was regarded as particularly controversial. Meda Ryan disputed his claim to have personally interviewed two Kilmichael Ambush veterans in 1988–89, a rifleman and a scout. Ryan stated that just one ambush veteran, Ned Young, was alive then. Young died on 13 November 1989, aged 97. The second last reported surviving veteran of the Kilmichael Ambush, Jack O'Sullivan, had died three years earlier in December 1986. Ned Young's son, John Young, stated in 2007 that his father was incapable of giving Hart an interview in 1988, as Ned Young suffered a debilitating stroke in late 1986. John Young swore an affidavit to this effect in December 2007, published in 2008 in Troubled History a critique of Hart's research. It reproduced on its cover a Southern Star report on the death of "Ned Young – last of the boys of Kilmichael", dated 18 November 1989. In 2011, Meehan reported on the deaths of the last surviving Kilmichael veterans as follows:

The 3rd December 1983 Southern Star report of that year's Kilmichael Ambush Commemoration noted three surviving veterans, Tim O'Connell, Jack O'Sullivan and Ned Young. The event was widely reported ... The following 24th December 1983 Southern Star reported, "One of the three surviving members of the famous KiImichael Ambush has died. He was lieutenant Timothy O'Connell". The newspaper referred, as did the 7th December 1985 Southern Star, to "two survivors, Ned Young and Jack O'Sullivan". One year later, the 20th December 1986 edition reported the death of "one of the last two Survivors of the Kilmichael Ambush Jack O'Sullivan". The 26th November 1988 Southern Star subsequently referred to "The sole Survivor of the volunteers who performed so well under the leadership of general Tom Barry, namely Ned Young".

Hart stated that he interviewed an unarmed scout, his second ambush participant, on 19 November 1989, six days after Ned Young died, one after his death was reported (see above). This claim intensified the debate, as the last ambush and dispatch scouts reportedly died in 1967 and 1971. In a 2010 television interview (broadcast 2011, 2022), Hart considered whether he had been the victim of "some sort of hoax" and of a "fantasist", but concluded "that seems extremely unlikely". D.R. O'Connor Lysaght wondered whether "it is possible that Dr Hart was the victim of one or more aged chancer".

Niall Meehan suggested in Troubled History (2008) and subsequently that Hart may have based his interview with the 'scout' partly on Jack Hennessy's BMH testimony (reported above). Though Hennessy died in 1970, Hart had a copy of his BMH statement. Hart's book paraphrased his anonymous scout reporting "a sort of false surrender". While Hennessy was not unarmed or a scout, in Hart's 1992 TCD PhD thesis his interviewee was not described as either a scout or as unarmed. Further anomalies surround this individual. For instance, Hart's PhD thesis reported him giving the author a tour of the ambush site, a claim his book withdrew. Eve Morrison argued in a 2012 essay on Kilmichael that Hart did not deliberately falsify evidence. She stated that one quote ascribed by Hart to the scout, in a 1969 audiotape Hart listened to, were actually uttered by ambush participant Jack O'Sullivan (who was not an unarmed scout). Meehan and Eve Morrison debated the significance of these anomalies in 2012, 2017, 2020 and 2022.

Hart's 1998 book cited three further ambush participant accounts, again anonymously. His claimed source was audio taped interviews a Father John Chisholm conducted in 1969, for Liam Deasy's memoir Toward Ireland Free (1973). However, Morrison stated in her 2012 Kilmichael essay that Chisholm tape-recorded two (not three) Kilmichael participants speaking on the ambush. One was Ned Young the other being Jack O'Sullivan, being the last and second last ambush veterans to die, in 1986 and 1989. Without informing his readers, Hart counted an anonymous Ned Young interview twice, the 1969 Chisholm interview and Hart's claimed 1988–9 interview. Hart gave readers an impression that he was citing two different veterans of the ambush.

In addition to his anonymous interviews, Hart cited a captured unsigned typed "rebel commandant's report" of the ambush from the Imperial War Museum, which does not mention a false surrender, as Barry's after-action report to his superiors. Meda Ryan and Brian Murphy challenged the authenticity of the document. They suggest that it contains factual errors Barry would not have made and also accurate information unknown to Barry. Examples of factual errors: stating falsely that the ambush was unplanned and a chance encounter; that two IRA volunteers had been mortally wounded and one killed outright, when the reverse was the case. Example of British knowledge unknown to Barry: getting British losses right, attesting to "sixteen of the enemy ... being killed", when Barry thought 17 (including H.F. Forde) were dead after the ambush. The document stated that IRA fighters had 100 rounds each when the correct figure reportedly was 35. Barry did not know that Guthrie, the Auxiliary who escaped, was, as the "report" put it, "now missing", or even that he had escaped. In other words, the document contained correct information known only to British authorities but unknown by Barry, and also incorrect information as to the planned nature of the engagement, the disposition of the IRA and the sequence of casualties, that Barry would not have misreported to his superiors.

In her book Tom Barry: IRA Freedom Fighter, Ryan suggested that the "rebel commandant's report" was forged by Castle officials and Auxiliaries during the Truce in order to help ensure that the families of those Auxiliaries who were killed at Kilmichael received compensation payments. Ryan's argument was discussed by American historian W. H. Kautt, who discovered that the report had been included in a collection of captured IRA documents published by the British Army's Irish Command in June 1921, before the Truce. On that basis, in Ambushes and Armour: The Irish Rebellion 1919-1921, Kautt suggested that the report could be authentic.

Hart continued to stand by his account until his death in 2010. In 2012 Eve Morrison published an essay, 'Kilmichael Revisited', in Terror in Ireland (David Fitzpatrick, ed.), based partly on IRA veteran testimony. She cited an unpublished draft response by Hart to the controversy surrounding his claims, dated 2004. The essay's defence of Hart was reviewed by John Borgonovo, Niall Meehan, Pádraig Óg Ó Ruairc and John Regan (in Irish Historical Studies, Reviews in History, History Ireland and Dublin Review of Books). Morrison cited six participant statements to the Bureau of Military History (including the controversial Timothy Keohane) that were published in 2003. She listened to Father John Chisholm's two veteran interviews for Liam Deasy's Toward Ireland Free, with Jack O'Sullivan and Ned Young (who also contributed a BMH account). In 2014 Irish Historical Studies published an 'Apology' to Morrison, for John Borgonovo's assertion, in his 2012 review of Terror in Ireland, that Morrison "provides little evidence for her assertion that Barry invented the false surrender story and then convinced his colleagues to maintain a fifty-year conspiracy of silence about it".

Morrison's 2022 book on the ambush, Kilmichael: the Life and Afterlife of an Ambush, also addressed the debate. She consulted Hart's original interview notes (in Memorial University Newfoundland) as well as notes he made while listening to Chisholm's recorded interviews. Hart's notes identified his Kilmichael interviewees as Ned Young and a Willie Chambers. Morrison said Chambers was the controversial anonymous unarmed scout interviewed on 19 November 1989. She also stated that a December 1947 Kerryman newspaper account of the ambush by West Cork local historian Flor Crowley does not support Barry's Guerilla Days version of events.

In November 2022 Niall Meehan's 'Rehabilitating Peter Hart' discussed Morrison's claims. He pointed out that Willie Chambers was not, by his own admission, at the Kilmichael Ambush on 20 November 1920. Chambers reported to his son that, at the time, he guarded a bridge some 15 kilometers away. Meehan also noted Morrison's admission that Ned Young, who was there, reportedly said nothing (aged 96) about the ambush at his alleged Hart interview. Yet Hart claimed Young's anonymous interview as a source of ambush information. Meehan noted that Flor Crowley's initial, 1947, reference to a false surrender at the first auxiliary lorry was soon afterwards changed to placing it (like Barry and Section Commander Stephen O'Neill) at the second lorry. In addition, Meehan pointed to a 2012 Father John Chisholm audio interview available online, not cited by Morrison. In it Chisholm asserted that Liam Deasy did not write Towards Ireland Free. Fr Chisholm stated that he wrote 'every line'. Chisholm also noted that he doubted the false surrender account before he researched it. He then admitted that he failed to put his view to Tom Barry when they met. Meehan pointed to Chisholm writing to Ned Young's son in 2008, stating that he had no audio-tape interview with Ned Young. Chisholm said he later re-discovered the interview three years later, claiming he had previously forgotten its existence. Notably, the Young interview contains at least two references to a false surrender event, that Hart did not mention in his 1998 report of Young's (then anonymous) Chisholm tape utterances. Meehan noted no specific refutation of a false surrender event at Kilmichael in Morrison's book, apart from by Hart, Chisholm and by Morrison herself. In other words, it was an assertion by interpreters of the event, not by those who participated in it.

Ambush participants named in Hart's above-mentioned unpublished 2004 draft response, bar Ned Young and the alleged 'scout', were all dead when Hart researched his PhD in the late 1980s. Hart's 2004 draft named six ambush participants: Paddy O'Brien, Jim "Spud" Murphy, Jack Hennessy, Ned Young, Michael O'Driscoll and Jack O'Sullivan. Significantly, he did not name the seventh, the 'scout' allegedly interviewed six days after Ned Young died. As noted, Morrison claimed in 2017 and 2022 this man to be Willie Chambers. She stated that Hart had heard or read ten accounts in total by these seven veterans (five witness statements and five other interviews). But this was in 2004, six years after publication of The IRA and its Enemies. Morrison identified Chisholm interview utterances in all but two of Hart's anonymous quotes (though without identifying these two). Confirming Meehan's 2008 observation, Morrison noted that a quote Hart ascribed to the 'scout' was in fact uttered by Chisholm interviewee Jack O'Sullivan.

Ned Young's son, John Young, afterwards continued to dispute the claim that Hart interviewed his then 96-year-old father in 1988. In April 2013, in a cosigned letter with Eve Morrison to History Ireland, Marion O'Driscoll took issue with John Young. She reported that her late husband Jim O'Driscoll had introduced Hart to Ned Young in the late 1980s and had "no doubt whatsoever that Hart had interviewed Ned Young". However, in 2007 Jim O'Driscoll witnessed John Young's signature to an earlier mentioned affidavit refuting Hart's claim to have interviewed his father. John Young responded, "It was wrong of Dr Morrison to imply [...] that the late Jim O'Driscoll did not read my Affidavit before witnessing my signature. He did just that when we met in Ballydehob in August 2007, as any sensible person would. [...] Before his untimely death, Jim O'Driscoll's name appeared twice publicly in relation to Peter Hart. First, in Hart's 1998 book that acknowledged Jim's kind assistance. Second, in Troubled History (2008) as a witness to my signature on my Affidavit, that refuted Peter Hart's claim: (a) to have interviewed my father; (b) to have interviewed a Kilmichael Ambush participant six days after my father, the last survivor, died. If Jim had felt so strongly about Hart's "scholarship", why did he associate himself, in any way, with a document critical of it? Why did he go out of his way freely to do so, having personally researched the issue? Readers may draw their own conclusions." In Rehabilitating Peter Hart, Meehan noted Morrison's admission that Hart's notes of his encounter with Ned Young do not include discussion of the Kilmichael Ambush. Meehan remarked, "despite claims in The IRA and its Enemies, Ned Young said nothing to Peter Hart about the Kilmichael Ambush. Why argue over whether Young was capable of speaking to Hart if he did not talk about the ambush? We are left with three possibilities. Either, incredibly, Hart did not ask Young about the ambush, Young refused to discuss it, or he was incapable of doing so. Take your pick".

== Commemoration ==
In 1929, an iron cross commemorating the engagement was erected on the site by Barry and some others who had taken part in the ambush. In 1966, to mark the fiftieth anniversary of the Easter Rising, it was decided that a roadside monument was to be erected in commemoration of the volunteers. The monument (pictured in infobox) was designed by Terry McCarthy, a stone cutter from Cork, with funds being raised by donations. The monument was unveiled on 10 July. During the ceremony Barry, who spoke at the unveiling, and other surviving volunteers paraded in a guard of honour.

== In popular culture ==
- A one-act play in the Irish language, Gleann an Mhacalla (The Echoing Glen) was written by an t-Athair Pádraig Ó hArgáin in 1970, the 50th anniversary of the ambush. It centres on the youngest of the three volunteers killed, 16 1/2-year-old Pat Deasy.
- Ken Loach's 2006 film The Wind That Shakes the Barley features an IRA ambush scene that is partly inspired by Kilmichael.
- The ambush is commemorated in the ballad The Boys of Kilmichael which has been recorded by Derek Warfield.

== Centenary documentaries ==
- In late 2020, film makers Brendan Hayes and Jerry O'Mullane along with David Sullivan and Bernie O'Regan announced that they were currently working on a documentary called Forget not the boys. Hayes has already produced work on Sam Maguire, another prominent figure in the war of independence. The documentary premiered on 28 November 2021 and featured interviews from the children of some of the volunteers who fought in the ambush as well as Barry biographer Meda Ryan and former Fine Gael leader Alan Dukes.
- As the COVID-19 pandemic prevented a public commemoration of the ambush from taking place, local historians of the Coppeen Archeological, Historical and Cultural Society produced a documentary titled Kilmichael – A Story of a Century.

== See also ==
- Crossbarry Ambush
- Carrowkennedy ambush
- Timeline of the Irish War of Independence

== Sources ==
- Tom Barry, Guerrilla Days in Ireland
- Richard Bennet, The Black and Tans
- Peter Hart, The IRA and its Enemies
- Michael Hopkinson, The Irish War of Independence
- Peter Hart, Meda Ryan, et al., in History Ireland, 2005, Vol 13, Numbers 2,3,4,5
- Troubled History - a tenth anniversary critique of Peter Hart's 'The IRA and its Enemies' Niall Meehan, Brian Murphy, Troubled History - a tenth anniversary critique of Peter Hart's 'The IRA and its Enemies'
- Niall Meehan, 'Examining Peter Hart', Field Day Review 10, 2014
- David Miller, British Propaganda in Ireland and its significance today (foreword to Murphy)
- Eve Morrison, 'Kilmichael Revisited', in David Fitzpatrick, Ed. Terror in Ireland, 1916-1923
- Brian Murphy, The Origin and Organisation of British Propaganda in Ireland in 1920.
- Meda Ryan, Tom Barry, IRA Freedom Fighter (ISBN 1-85635-480-6) (Blackrock: Mercier Press, 2003)
- Eve Morrison, Kilmichael: the Life and Afterlife of an Ambush (Newbridge: Irish Academic Press, 2022)
- Niall Meehan, Rehabilitating Peter Hart (a critique of Morrison's 2022 research) (Aubane 2022)
