= Kilmichael, County Cork =

Village in County Cork, Ireland

Kilmichael Cill Mhichíl
- Village
- Post office and bar in Kilmichael

- Location in Ireland
- Coordinates: 51.8346°N 9.037°W
- Country: Ireland
- Province: Munster
- County: County Cork
- Time zone: UTC+0 (WET)
  - Summer (DST): UTC-1 (IST (WEST))

Kilmichael (Irish: Cill Mhichíl) is a village and civil parish in West Muskerry, County Cork, Ireland. Kilmichael's post office (P.O.) is located on an early map (1897-1913) at the Cooldorragha Cross Roads. Kilmichael is part of the Cork North-West.

== Kilmichael Ambush ==
The Kilmichael Ambush took place near the village during the Irish War of Independence. The actual fight took place in the townlands of Haremount (Cnocán an Ghiorria in Irish) and Shanacashel (Seanchaiseal). The Kilmichael Ambush site is marked by a monument which is approximately 3.2 km (2 mi) south of the village.

== Schools ==
The local national school, Dromleigh National School, is one of the oldest in Ireland and celebrated its 175th anniversary in 2015. The school was opened in 1840 and still operates from the original school building.

== See also ==
- Cahervagliar, a nearby ringfort
